= Çeltikli =

Çeltikli can refer to:

- Çeltikli, Bismil
- Çeltikli, Bitlis
- Çeltikli, Haymana
