= Aralık (disambiguation) =

Aralık can refer to:

- Aralık
- Aralık, Bismil
- Aralık, Borçka
- Aralık, Mustafakemalpaşa
