= Çakallı =

Çakallı can refer to:

- Çakallı, Bismil
- Çakallı, Karaisalı
