= Meydanlık, Bismil =

Village in Diyarbakır Province, Turkey

Meydanlık
- Neighbourhood
- Location in Turkey
- Coordinates: 37.754°N 40.652°E
- Country: Turkey
- Province: Diyarbakır
- District: Bismil
- Population (2022): 220
- Time zone: UTC+3 (TRT)

Meydanlık (Kurdish: Mellemus) is a neighbourhood in the municipality and district of Bismil, Diyarbakır Province in Turkey. It is populated by Kurds of the Barava and Surgucu tribes and had a population of 220 in 2022.
