= Aşağıoba, Bismil =

Village in Diyarbakır Province, Turkey

Aşağıoba
- Neighbourhood
- Location in Turkey
- Coordinates: 37.785°N 40.878°E
- Country: Turkey
- Province: Diyarbakır
- District: Bismil
- Population (2022): 199
- Time zone: UTC+3 (TRT)

Aşağıoba (Kurdish: Merxandê) is a neighbourhood in the municipality and district of Bismil, Diyarbakır Province in Turkey. The village is populated by Kurds of the Barava tribe and had a population of 199 in 2022.
