= Tatlıçayır, Bismil =

Village in Diyarbakır Province, Turkey

Tatlıçayır
- Neighbourhood
- Location in Turkey
- Coordinates: 38.009°N 40.637°E
- Country: Turkey
- Province: Diyarbakır
- District: Bismil
- Population (2022): 80
- Time zone: UTC+3 (TRT)

Tatlıçayır (Kurdish: Kerxê) is a neighbourhood in the municipality and district of Bismil, Diyarbakır Province in Turkey. The village is populated by Kurds and had a population of 80 in 2022.
