= Merdan, Bismil =

Village in Diyarbakır Province, Turkey

Merdan
- Neighbourhood
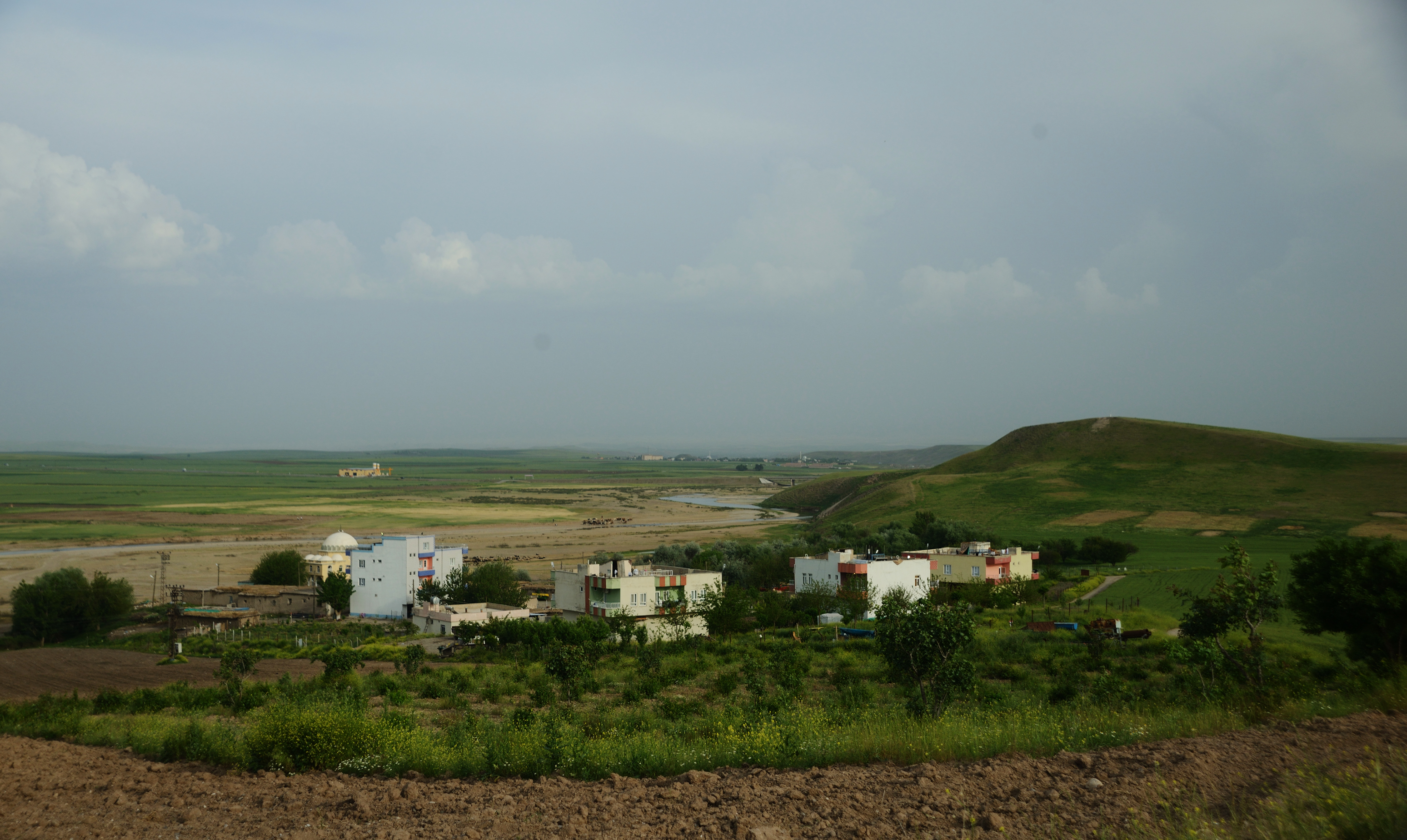

- Location within Turkey
- Coordinates: 37.827°N 40.831°E
- Country: Turkey
- Province: Diyarbakır
- District: Bismil
- Population (2022): 122
- Time zone: UTC+3 (TRT)

Merdan (Kurdish: Xincika) is a neighbourhood in the municipality and district of Bismil, Diyarbakır Province in Turkey. The village is populated by Kurds of the Barava tribe and had a population of 122 in 2022.
