= Ofköy, Bismil =

Village in Turkey

Ofköy
- Neighbourhood
- Location in Turkey
- Coordinates: 37°53′N 40°44′E
- Country: Turkey
- Province: Diyarbakır
- District: Bismil
- Population (2022): 127
- Time zone: UTC+3 (TRT)

Ofköy is a neighbourhood in the municipality and district of Bismil, Diyarbakır Province in Turkey. Its population is 127 (2022).
