= Aluç, Bismil =

Village in Diyarbakır Province, Turkey

Aluç
- Neighbourhood
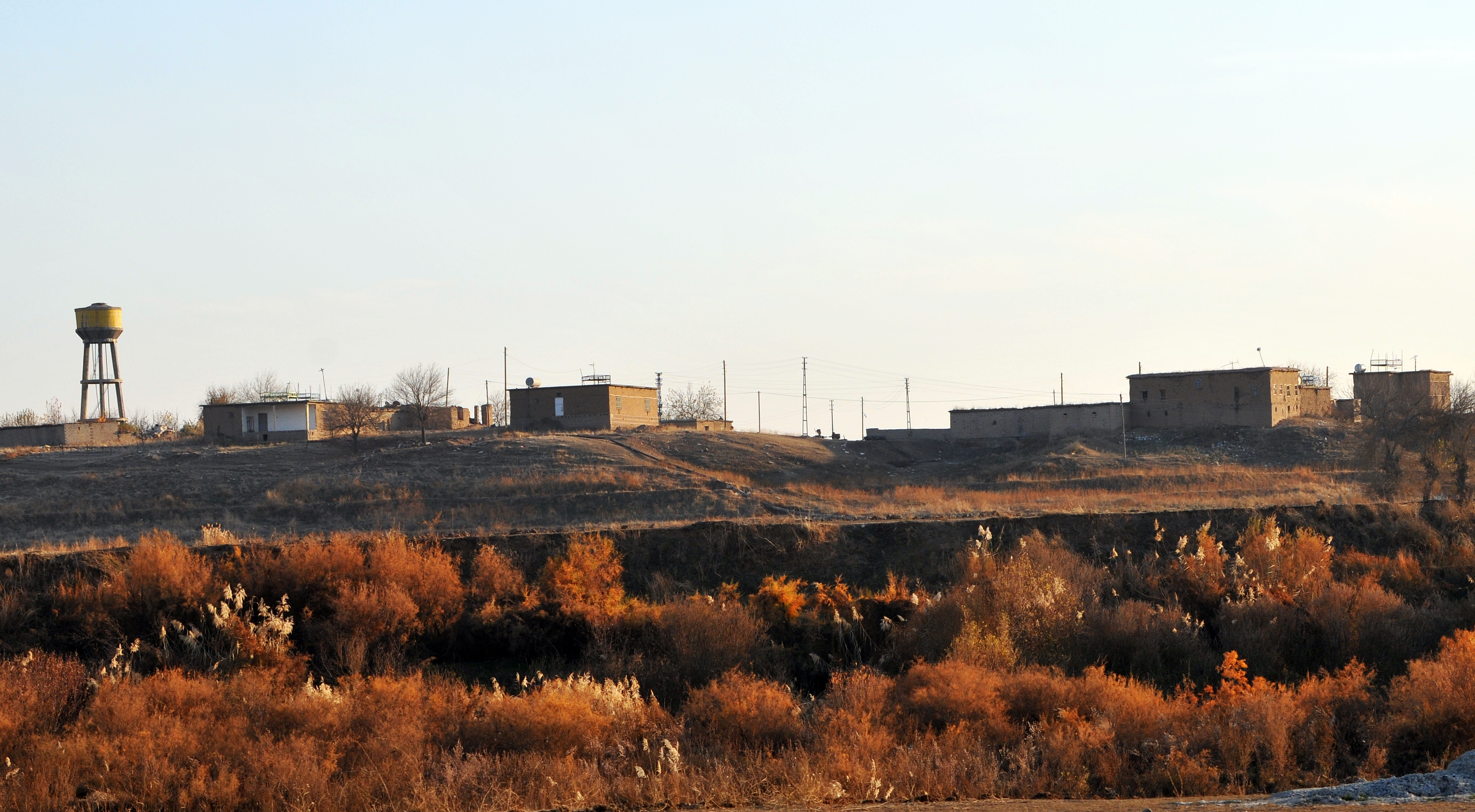

- Location within Turkey
- Coordinates: 37.828°N 40.841°E
- Country: Turkey
- Province: Diyarbakır
- District: Bismil
- Population (2022): 71
- Time zone: UTC+3 (TRT)

Aluç (Kurdish: Alluzê; Syriac: ʿAlūzī) (Note: Alternatively transliterated as Alouzé, Allos, or Alluz.) is a neighbourhood in the municipality and district of Bismil, Diyarbakır Province in Turkey. The village is populated by Kurds of the Barava tribe and had a population of 71 in 2022.

== History ==
ʿAlūzī was historically inhabited by Syriac Orthodox Christians. In the Syriac Orthodox patriarchal register of dues of 1870, it was recorded that the village had five households, who paid twenty dues, and did not have a church or a priest. It was located in the district of al-Bahramakiyyah. There were 100 Syriacs in 1914, according to the list presented to the Paris Peace Conference by the Assyro-Chaldean delegation.

== Bibliography ==
- Bcheiry, Iskandar (2009). The Syriac Orthodox Patriarchal Register of Dues of 1870: An Unpublished Historical Document from the Late Ottoman Period. Gorgias Press.
- Gaunt, David (2006). Massacres, Resistance, Protectors: Muslim-Christian Relations in Eastern Anatolia during World War I. Gorgias Press.
- Jongerden, Joost; Verheij, Jelle, eds. (2012). Social Relations in Ottoman Diyarbekir, 1870-1915. Brill.
- Tan, Altan (2018). Turabidin'den Berriye'ye. Aşiretler - Dinler - Diller - Kültürler (in Turkish). ISBN 9789944360944.
