= Çölağan, Bismil =

Village in Turkey

Çölağan
- Neighbourhood
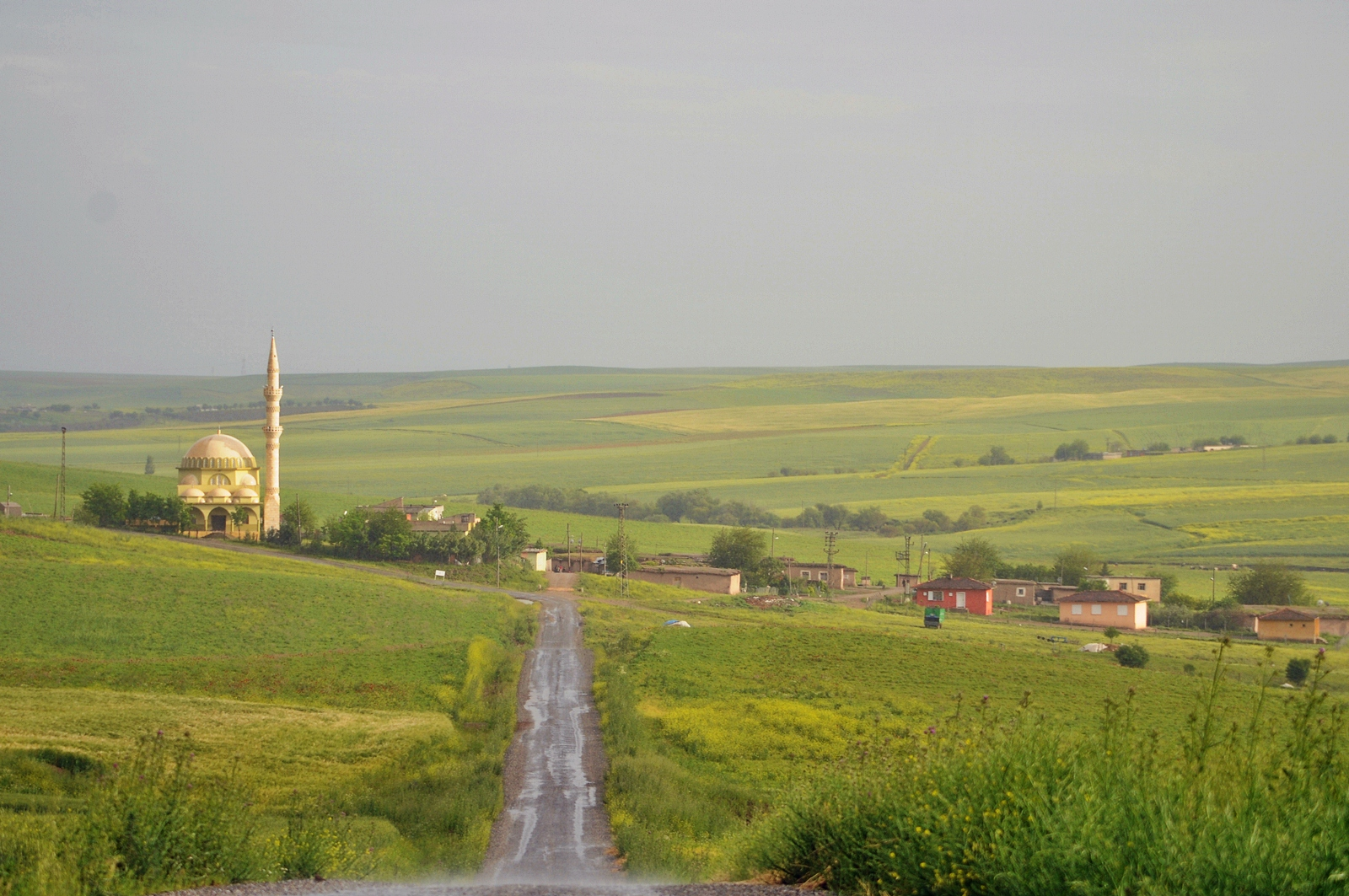

- Location within Turkey
- Coordinates: 38°01′N 40°30′E
- Country: Turkey
- Province: Diyarbakır
- District: Bismil
- Population (2022): 139
- Time zone: UTC+3 (TRT)

Çölağan is a neighbourhood in the municipality and district of Bismil, Diyarbakır Province in Turkey. Its population is 139 (2022).
