= Ataköy, Bismil =

Village in Diyarbakır Province, Turkey

Ataköy
- Neighbourhood
- Location in Turkey
- Coordinates: 37.938°N 40.529°E
- Country: Turkey
- Province: Diyarbakır
- District: Bismil
- Population (2022): 29
- Time zone: UTC+3 (TRT)

Ataköy (Kurdish: Darakol) is a neighbourhood in the municipality and district of Bismil, Diyarbakır Province in Turkey. The village is populated by Yazidi Kurds and had a population of 29 in 2022. The villagers adhere to Yazidism.
