= Erler, Bismil =

Village in Turkey

Erler
- Neighbourhood
- Country: Turkey
- Province: Diyarbakır
- District: Bismil
- Population (2022): 129
- Time zone: UTC+3 (TRT)

Erler is a neighbourhood in the municipality and district of Bismil, Diyarbakır Province in Turkey. Its population is 129 (2022).
