= Karatepe, Bismil =

Village in Turkey

Karatepe
- Neighbourhood
- Location in Turkey
- Coordinates: 37.963°N 40.903°E
- Country: Turkey
- Province: Diyarbakır
- District: Bismil
- Population (2022): 194
- Time zone: UTC+3 (TRT)

Karatepe (Kurdish: Girhebeş) is a neighbourhood in the municipality and district of Bismil, Diyarbakır Province in Turkey. It is populated by Kurds and had a population of 194 in 2022.
