= Yasince, Bismil =

Village in Diyarbakır Province, Turkey

Yasince
- Neighbourhood
- Location in Turkey
- Coordinates: 37.907°N 40.548°E
- Country: Turkey
- Province: Diyarbakır
- District: Bismil
- Population (2022): 229
- Time zone: UTC+3 (TRT)

Yasince (Kurdish: Haydarkol) is a neighbourhood in the municipality and district of Bismil, Diyarbakır Province in Turkey. It is populated by Kurds and had a population of 229 in 2022. The villagers adhere to Yazidism.
