= Serçeler, Bismil =

Village in Diyarbakır Province, Turkey

Serçeler
- Neighbourhood
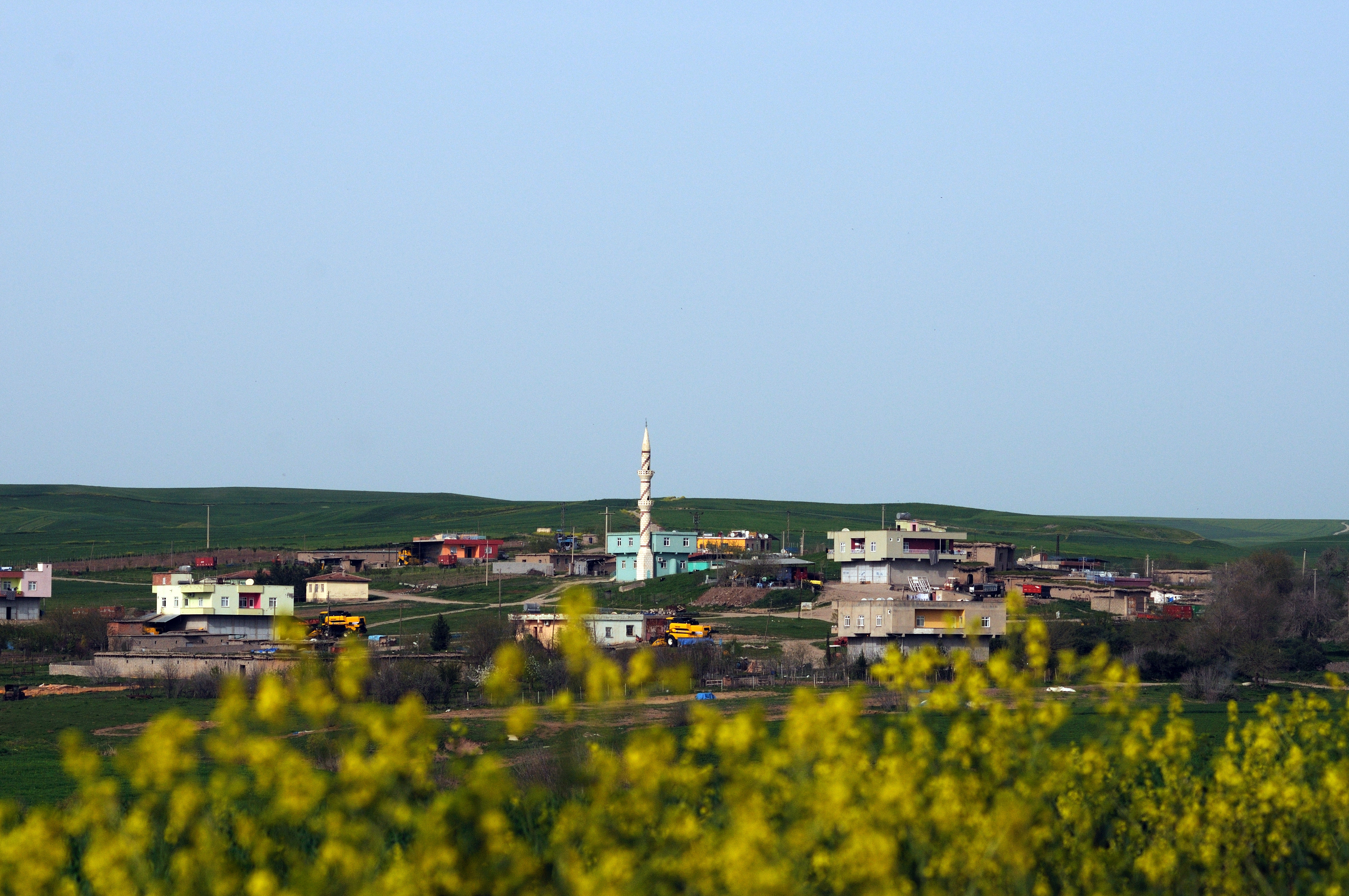

- Location within Turkey
- Coordinates: 37.936°N 40.667°E
- Country: Turkey
- Province: Diyarbakır
- District: Bismil
- Population (2022): 367
- Time zone: UTC+3 (TRT)

Serçeler (Kurdish: Şidada) is a neighbourhood in the municipality and district of Bismil, Diyarbakır Province in Turkey. The village is populated by Kurds had a population of 367 in 2022.

In June 2023, a land dispute broke out between two families in the village which resulted in the deaths of nine people.
