= Yukarıdolay, Bismil =

Village in Turkey

Yukarıdolay
- Neighbourhood
- Location in Turkey
- Coordinates: 37°55′N 40°44′E
- Country: Turkey
- Province: Diyarbakır
- District: Bismil
- Population (2022): 166
- Time zone: UTC+3 (TRT)

Yukarıdolay is a neighbourhood in the municipality and district of Bismil, Diyarbakır Province in Turkey. Its population is 166 (2022).
