= Karayiğit, Bismil =

Village in Turkey

Karayiğit
- Neighbourhood
- Country: Turkey
- Province: Diyarbakır
- District: Bismil
- Population (2022): 136
- Time zone: UTC+3 (TRT)

Karayiğit is a neighbourhood in the municipality and district of Bismil, Diyarbakır Province in Turkey. Its population is 136 (2022).
