= Kılavuztepe, Bismil =

Village in Turkey

Kılavuztepe
- Neighbourhood
- Location in Turkey
- Coordinates: 37°45′N 40°41′E
- Country: Turkey
- Province: Diyarbakır
- District: Bismil
- Population (2022): 59
- Time zone: UTC+3 (TRT)

Kılavuztepe is a neighbourhood in the municipality and district of Bismil, Diyarbakır Province in Turkey. Its population is 59 (2022).
