= Gedikbaşı, Bismil =

Village in Diyarbakır Province, Turkey

Gedikbaşı
- Neighbourhood
- Location in Turkey
- Coordinates: 37.738°N 40.903°E
- Country: Turkey
- Province: Diyarbakır
- District: Bismil
- Population (2022): 60
- Time zone: UTC+3 (TRT)

Gedikbaşı (Kurdish: Karapeçe) is a neighbourhood in the municipality and district of Bismil, Diyarbakır Province in Turkey. The village is populated by Kurds of the Barava tribe and had a population of 60 in 2022.
