= Tepecik, Bismil =

Village in Diyarbakır Province, Turkey

Tepecik
- Neighbourhood
- Location in Turkey
- Coordinates: 37.680°N 40.848°E
- Country: Turkey
- Province: Diyarbakır
- District: Bismil
- Population (2022): 269
- Time zone: UTC+3 (TRT)

Tepecik (Kurdish: Girêfaris) is a neighbourhood in the municipality and district of Bismil, Diyarbakır Province in Turkey. The village is populated by Kurds of the Barava tribe and had a population of 269 in 2022.
