= Ağıllı, Bismil =

Village in Diyarbakır Province, Turkey

Ağıllı
- Neighbourhood
- Location in Turkey
- Coordinates: 37.735°N 40.694°E
- Country: Turkey
- Province: Diyarbakır
- District: Bismil
- Population (2022): 76
- Time zone: UTC+3 (TRT)

Ağıllı (Kurdish: Birikê) is a neighbourhood in the municipality and district of Bismil, Diyarbakır Province in Turkey. The village is populated by Kurds of the Barava tribe and had a population of 76 in 2022.
