= Pınarbaşı, Bismil =

Village in Diyarbakır Province, Turkey

Pınarbaşı
- Neighbourhood
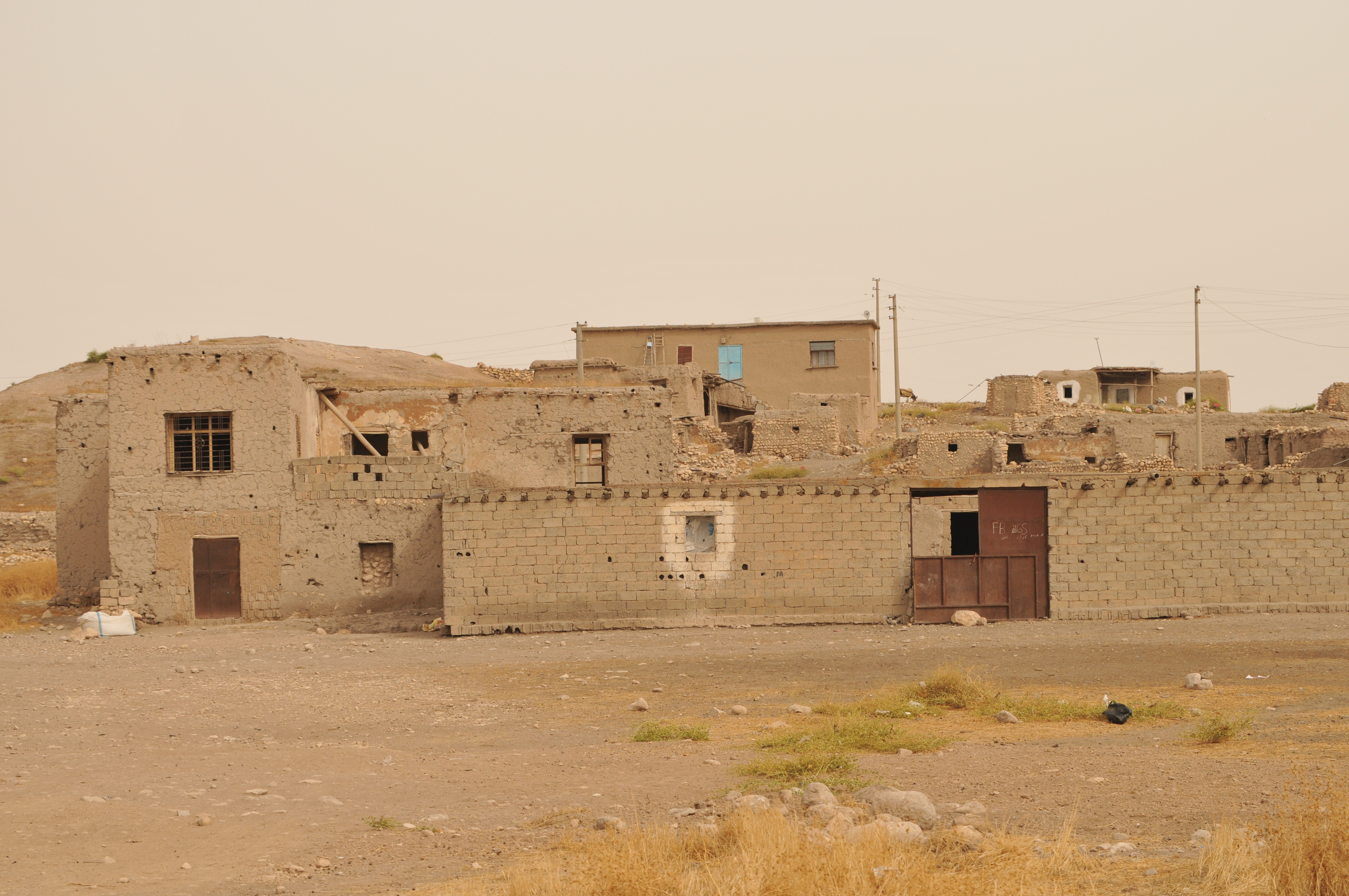

- Location within Turkey
- Coordinates: 37.711°N 40.884°E
- Country: Turkey
- Province: Diyarbakır
- District: Bismil
- Population (2022): 218
- Time zone: UTC+3 (TRT)

Pınarbaşı (Kurdish: Matarê; Syriac: Maṭarī) (Note: Alternatively transliterated as Matar or Matri.) is a neighbourhood in the municipality and district of Bismil, Diyarbakır Province in Turkey. The village is populated by Kurds of the Barava tribe and had a population of 218 in 2022.

== History ==
Maṭarī (today called Pınarbaşı) was historically inhabited by Syriac Orthodox Christians. In the Syriac Orthodox patriarchal register of dues of 1870, it was recorded that the village had eight households, who paid twenty-six dues, and was served by one priest. There was a church of Yūldaṯ Alohō. It was located in the district of al-Bahramakiyyah. There were 150 Syriacs in 1914, according to the list presented to the Paris Peace Conference by the Assyro-Chaldean delegation.

== Bibliography ==
- Bcheiry, Iskandar (2009). The Syriac Orthodox Patriarchal Register of Dues of 1870: An Unpublished Historical Document from the Late Ottoman Period. Gorgias Press.
- Gaunt, David (2006). Massacres, Resistance, Protectors: Muslim-Christian Relations in Eastern Anatolia during World War I. Gorgias Press.
- Jongerden, Joost; Verheij, Jelle, eds. (2012). Social Relations in Ottoman Diyarbekir, 1870-1915. Brill.
- Tan, Altan (2018). Turabidin'den Berriye'ye. Aşiretler - Dinler - Diller - Kültürler (in Turkish). ISBN 9789944360944.
