= Keberli, Bismil =

Village in Diyarbakır Province, Turkey

Keberli
- Neighbourhood
- Location in Turkey
- Coordinates: 37.907°N 40.627°E
- Country: Turkey
- Province: Diyarbakır
- District: Bismil
- Population (2022): 292
- Time zone: UTC+3 (TRT)

Keberli is a neighbourhood in the municipality and district of Bismil, Diyarbakır Province in Turkey. The village had a population of 292 in 2022.
