= Kurudeğirmen, Bismil =

Village in Diyarbakır Province, Turkey

Kurudeğirmen
- Neighbourhood
- Location in Turkey
- Coordinates: 37.706°N 40.698°E
- Country: Turkey
- Province: Diyarbakır
- District: Bismil
- Population (2022): 26
- Time zone: UTC+3 (TRT)

Kurudeğirmen (Kurdish: Kopeklî) is a neighbourhood in the municipality and district of Bismil, Diyarbakır Province in Turkey. The village is populated by Kurds and had a population of 26 in 2022.

It was burned by authorities in 1995, during the Kurdish–Turkish conflict.
