= Seyit Hasan, Bismil =

Village in Diyarbakır Province, Turkey

Seyit Hasan
- Neighbourhood
- Location in Turkey
- Coordinates: 37.884°N 40.593°E
- Country: Turkey
- Province: Diyarbakır
- District: Bismil
- Population (2022): 232
- Time zone: UTC+3 (TRT)

Seyit Hasan (formerly Bakacık, Kurdish: Seyîdhesen) is a neighbourhood in the municipality and district of Bismil, Diyarbakır Province in Turkey. It is populated by Kurds and by Turkmens and had a population of 232 in 2022.

== History ==
The Alevi Turkmen population settled in the village from Kisas in the 20th century. Many of them migrated to Germany and other parts of Turkey after 1989, while Kurds would settle in the village.
