= Karabörk, Bismil =

Village in Turkey

Karabörk
- Neighbourhood
- Country: Turkey
- Province: Diyarbakır
- District: Bismil
- Population (2022): 29
- Time zone: UTC+3 (TRT)

Karabörk is a neighbourhood in the municipality and district of Bismil, Diyarbakır Province in Turkey. Its population is 29 (2022).
