= Topraklı, Bismil =

Village in Diyarbakır Province, Turkey

Topraklı
- Neighbourhood
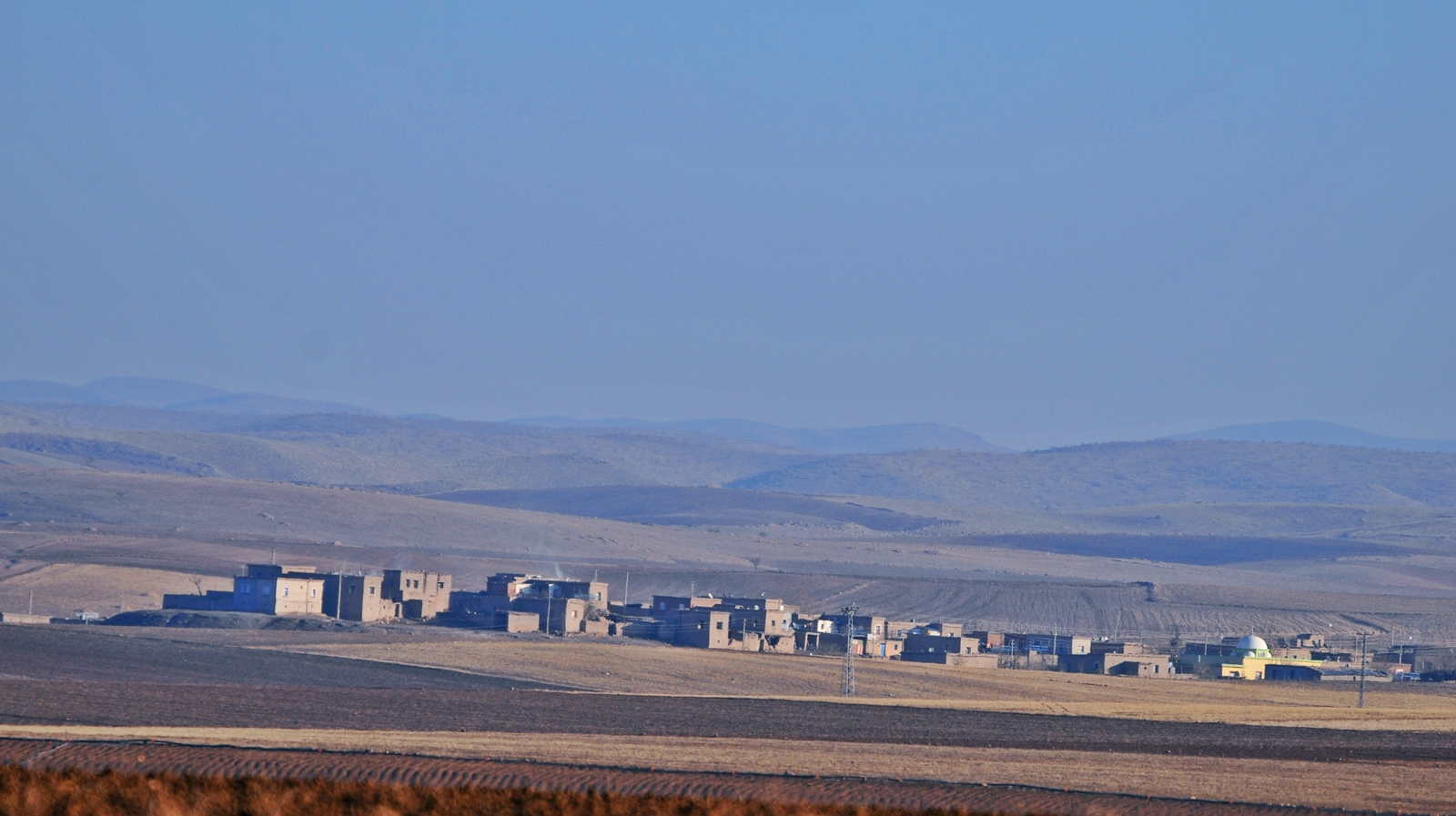

- Location within Turkey
- Coordinates: 37.714°N 40.960°E
- Country: Turkey
- Province: Diyarbakır
- District: Bismil
- Population (2022): 356
- Time zone: UTC+3 (TRT)

Topraklı (Kurdish: Hillanê) is a neighbourhood in the municipality and district of Bismil, Diyarbakır Province in Turkey. The village is populated by Kurds of the Barava tribe and had a population of 356 in 2022.
