= Obalı, Bismil =

Village in Turkey

Obalı
- Neighbourhood
- Location in Turkey
- Coordinates: 37°50′14″N 40°38′48″E
- Country: Turkey
- Province: Diyarbakır
- District: Bismil
- Population (2022): 350
- Time zone: UTC+3 (TRT)

Obalı is a neighbourhood in the municipality and district of Bismil, Diyarbakır Province in Turkey. Its population is 350 (2022).
