= Uğurlu, Bismil =

Village in Turkey

Uğurlu
- Neighbourhood
- Location in Turkey
- Coordinates: 38°00′07″N 40°52′34″E
- Country: Turkey
- Province: Diyarbakır
- District: Bismil
- Population (2022): 327
- Time zone: UTC+3 (TRT)

Uğurlu is a neighbourhood in the municipality and district of Bismil, Diyarbakır Province in Turkey. Its population is 327 (2022).
