= Babahaki, Bismil =

Village in Diyarbakır Province, Turkey

Babahaki
- Neighbourhood
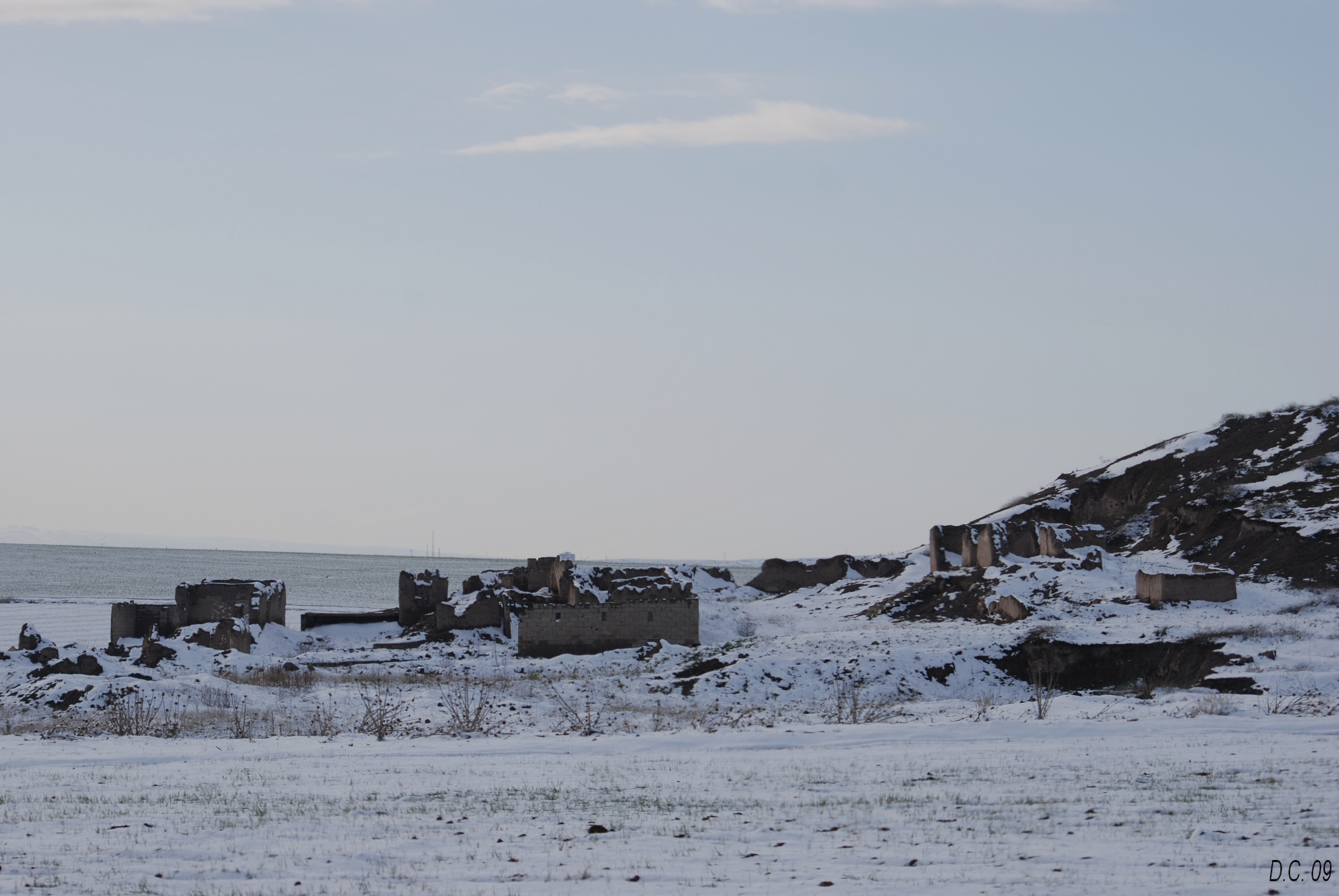

- Location within Turkey
- Coordinates: 37.862°N 40.757°E
- Country: Turkey
- Province: Diyarbakır
- District: Bismil
- Population (2022): 31
- Time zone: UTC+3 (TRT)

Babahaki (Kurdish: Babaxakî) is a neighbourhood in the municipality and district of Bismil, Diyarbakır Province in Turkey. The village is populated by Kurds and had a population of 31 in 2022.
