= Boyacı, Bismil =

Village in Turkey

Boyacı
- Neighbourhood
- Location in Turkey
- Coordinates: 37.9701°N 41.0239°E
- Country: Turkey
- Province: Diyarbakır
- District: Bismil
- Population (2022): 242
- Time zone: UTC+3 (TRT)

Boyacı is a neighbourhood in the municipality and district of Bismil, Diyarbakır Province in Turkey. Its population is 242 (2022).
