= İsapınar, Bismil =

Village in Diyarbakır Province, Turkey

İsapınar
- Neighbourhood
- Location in Turkey
- Coordinates: 37.723°N 40.747°E
- Country: Turkey
- Province: Diyarbakır
- District: Bismil
- Population (2022): 426
- Time zone: UTC+3 (TRT)

İsapınar (Kurdish: Îsapar) (Note: Also known as Isa Bwâr, ‘Isa-Powar, Isa-Powar, Issa-Pouar, Yssa-Pouar, and İsapınarköy.) is a neighbourhood in the municipality and district of Bismil, Diyarbakır Province in Turkey. The village is populated by Kurds of the Barava tribe and had a population of 426 in 2022.

== History ==
‘Isa-Powar (today called İsapınar) was historically inhabited by Syriac Orthodox Christians. It was located in the kaza (district) of Silvan in the Diyarbakır sanjak in the Diyarbekir vilayet in c. 1900. In 1914, it was populated by 200 Syriacs, according to the list presented to the Paris Peace Conference by the Assyro-Chaldean delegation. By 1914, it was situated in the Bafaya nahiyah (commune) of the kaza of Beşiri. The Chaldean Catholic priest Joseph Tfinkdji estimated the village's population as 300 in 1914, including 80 Chaldean Catholics and Armenian Catholics. Amidst the Sayfo, the head of the village, a Syriac called Rais Bero, was summoned to Diyarbakır and he and his son-in-law were killed after they refused to convert to Islam. No survivors of the Sayfo are attested from this area.

== Bibliography ==
- Courtois, Sébastien de (2004). The Forgotten Genocide: Eastern Christians, The Last Arameans. Translated by Vincent Aurora. Gorgias Press.
- Gaunt, David (2006). Massacres, Resistance, Protectors: Muslim-Christian Relations in Eastern Anatolia during World War I. Gorgias Press.
- Jongerden, Joost; Verheij, Jelle, eds. (2012). Social Relations in Ottoman Diyarbekir, 1870-1915. Brill.
- Tan, Altan (2018). Turabidin'den Berriye'ye. Aşiretler - Dinler - Diller - Kültürler (in Turkish). ISBN 9789944360944.
