= Akbaş, Bismil =

Village in Diyarbakır Province, Turkey

Akbaş
- Neighbourhood
- Location in Turkey
- Coordinates: 37.977°N 41.060°E
- Country: Turkey
- Province: Diyarbakır
- District: Bismil
- Population (2022): 436
- Time zone: UTC+3 (TRT)

Akbaş (Kurdish: Sergewran) is a neighbourhood in the municipality and district of Bismil, Diyarbakır Province in Turkey. The village is populated by Kurds of the Beritan tribe and had a population of 436 in 2022.
