= Köprüköy, Bismil =

Village in Turkey

Köprüköy
- Neighbourhood
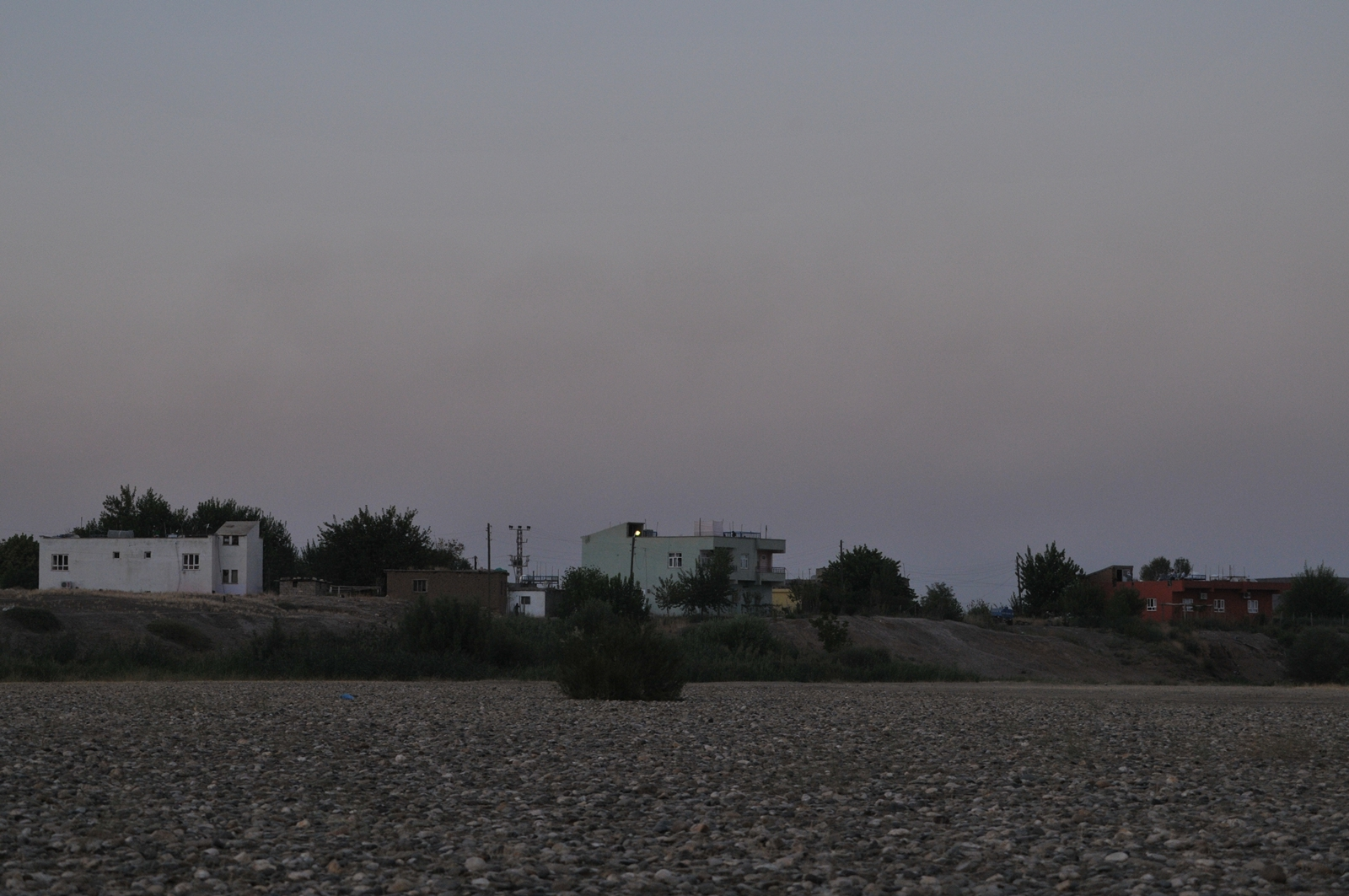

- Location within Turkey
- Country: Turkey
- Province: Diyarbakır
- District: Bismil
- Population (2022): 47
- Time zone: UTC+3 (TRT)

Köprüköy is a neighbourhood in the municipality and district of Bismil, Diyarbakır Province in Turkey. Its population is 47 (2022).
