= Bademli, Bismil =

Village in Diyarbakır Province, Turkey

Bademli
- Neighbourhood
- Location in Turkey
- Coordinates: 37.925°N 40.960°E
- Country: Turkey
- Province: Diyarbakır
- District: Bismil
- Population (2022): 610
- Time zone: UTC+3 (TRT)

Bademli (Kurdish: Mezra Evdilqadir) is a neighbourhood in the municipality and district of Bismil, Diyarbakır Province in Turkey. The village is populated by Kurds of the Elmanî tribe and had a population of 610 in 2022.
