= Sarıtoprak, Bismil =

Village in Turkey

Sarıtoprak
- Neighbourhood
- Location in Turkey
- Coordinates: 37°50′06″N 40°28′17″E
- Country: Turkey
- Province: Diyarbakır
- District: Bismil
- Population (2022): 596
- Time zone: UTC+3 (TRT)

Sarıtoprak (Note: Formerly known as Holan, Hola, Hulan, Olam, Olan, or Ulam.) is a neighbourhood in the municipality and district of Bismil, Diyarbakır Province in Turkey. Its population is 596 (2022).

== History ==
Holan (today called Sarıtoprak) was historically inhabited by Syriac Orthodox Christians. The village was pillaged during the Massacres of Diyarbekir (1895). In 1914, the village was populated by 50 Syriacs, according to the list presented to the Paris Peace Conference by the Assyro-Chaldean delegation.

== Bibliography ==
- Abed Mshiho Neman of Qarabash (2021) [1918]. Sayfo – An Account of the Assyrian Genocide. Translated by Michael Abdalla; Łukasz Kiczko. Edinburgh University Press.
- Courtois, Sébastien de (2004). The Forgotten Genocide: Eastern Christians, The Last Arameans. Translated by Vincent Aurora. Gorgias Press.
- Gaunt, David (2006). Massacres, Resistance, Protectors: Muslim-Christian Relations in Eastern Anatolia during World War I. Gorgias Press.
- Jongerden, Joost; Verheij, Jelle, eds. (2012). Social Relations in Ottoman Diyarbekir, 1870-1915. Brill.
