= Mirzabey, Bismil =

Village in Turkey

Mirzabey
- Neighbourhood
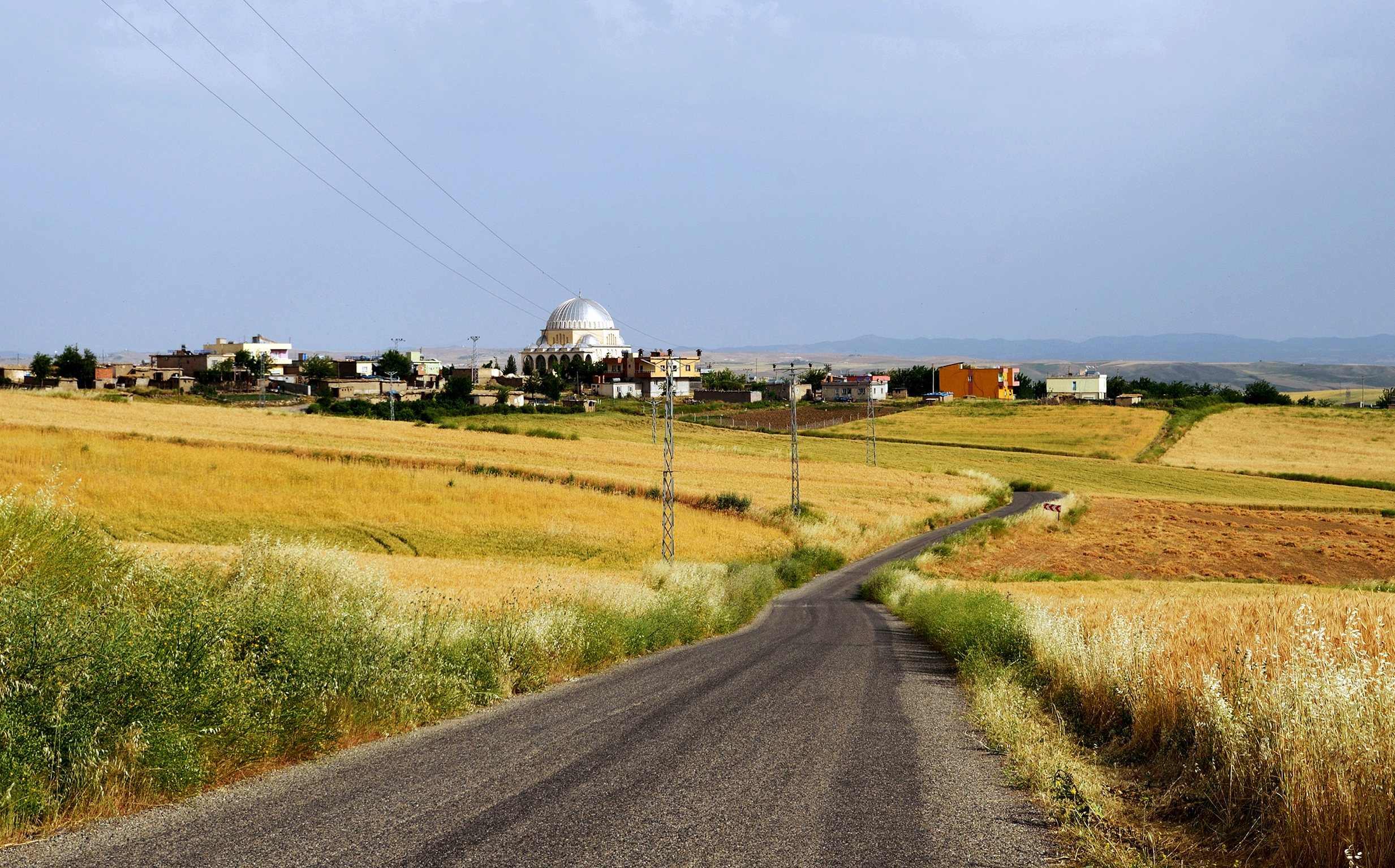

- Location within Turkey
- Coordinates: 37.915°N 41.009°E
- Country: Turkey
- Province: Diyarbakır
- District: Bismil
- Population (2022): 665
- Time zone: UTC+3 (TRT)

Mirzabey (Kurdish: Mîrzabega) is a neighbourhood in the municipality and district of Bismil, Diyarbakır Province in Turkey. It is populated by Kurds and had a population of 665 in 2022.
