= Akköy, Bismil =

Village in Diyarbakır Province, Turkey

Akköy
- Neighbourhood
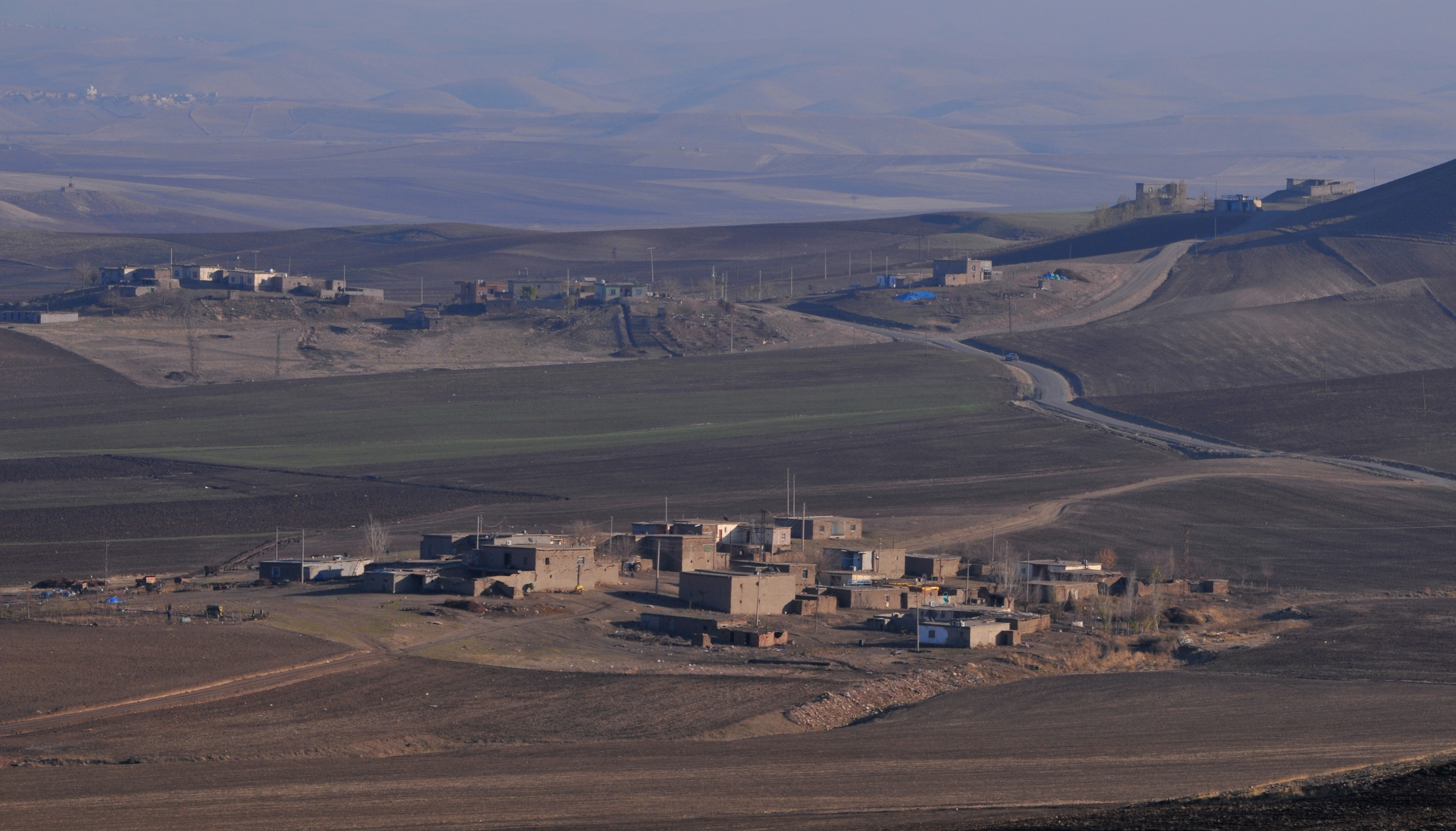

- Location within Turkey
- Coordinates: 37.752°N 40.925°E
- Country: Turkey
- Province: Diyarbakır
- District: Bismil
- Population (2022): 313
- Time zone: UTC+3 (TRT)

Akköy (Kurdish: Şêx Usufê) is a neighbourhood in the municipality and district of Bismil, Diyarbakır Province in Turkey. The village is populated by Kurds of the Barava tribe and had a population of 313 in 2022.
