= Ulutürk, Bismil =

Village in Turkey

Ulutürk
- Neighbourhood
- Location in Turkey
- Coordinates: 37°51′43″N 40°38′23″E
- Country: Turkey
- Province: Diyarbakır
- District: Bismil
- Population (2022): 4,612
- Time zone: UTC+3 (TRT)

Ulutürk is a neighbourhood in the municipality and district of Bismil, Diyarbakır Province in Turkey. Its population is 4,612 (2022).
