= Karaçölya, Bismil =

Village in Turkey

Karaçölya
- Neighbourhood
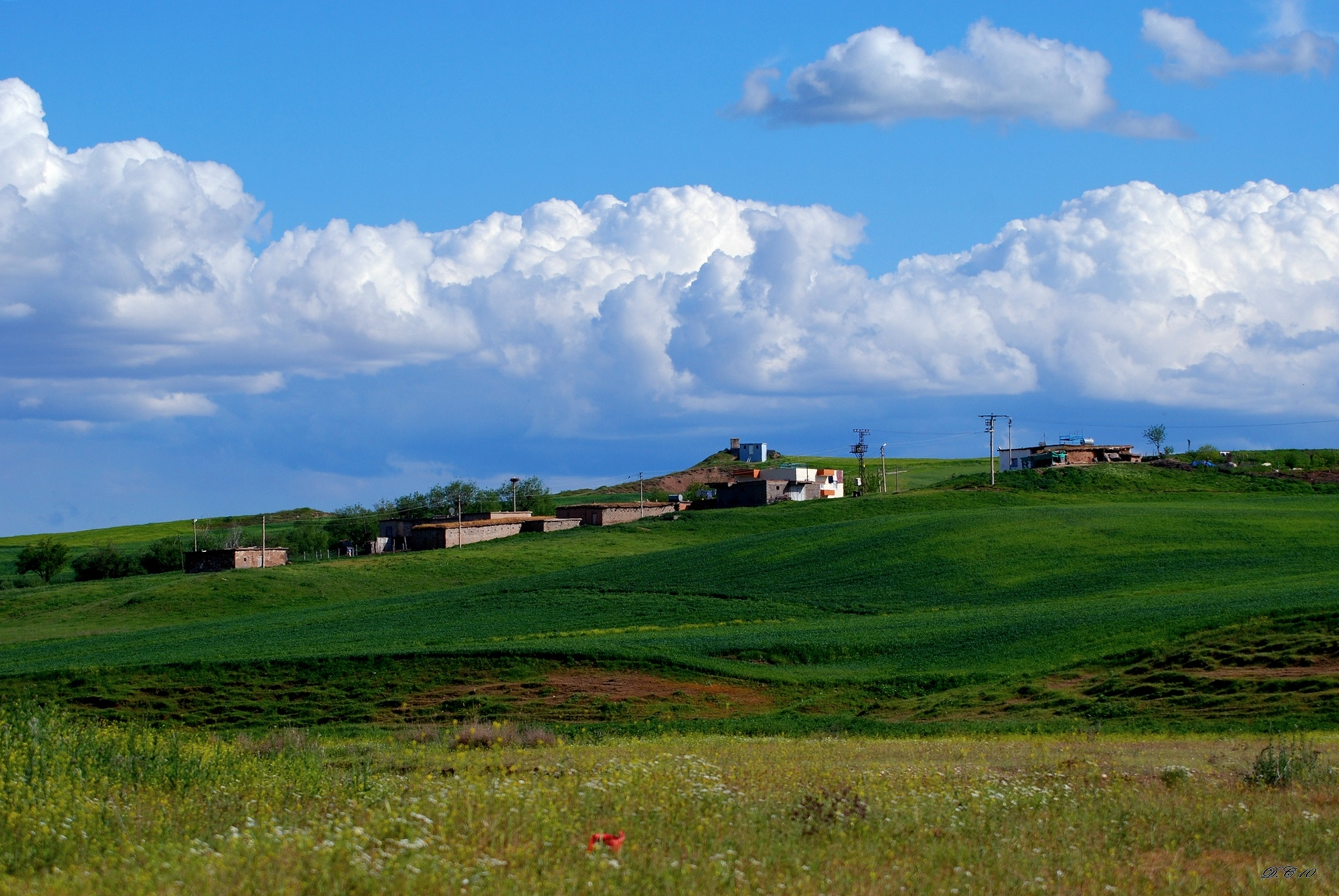
- Qarecholiya village

- Location within Turkey
- Coordinates: 37°56′45″N 40°45′33″E
- Country: Turkey
- Province: Diyarbakır
- District: Bismil
- Population (2022): 49
- Time zone: UTC+3 (TRT)

Karaçölya is a neighbourhood in the municipality and district of Bismil, Diyarbakır Province in Turkey. Its population is 49 (2022).
