= Bismil =

- District and municipality
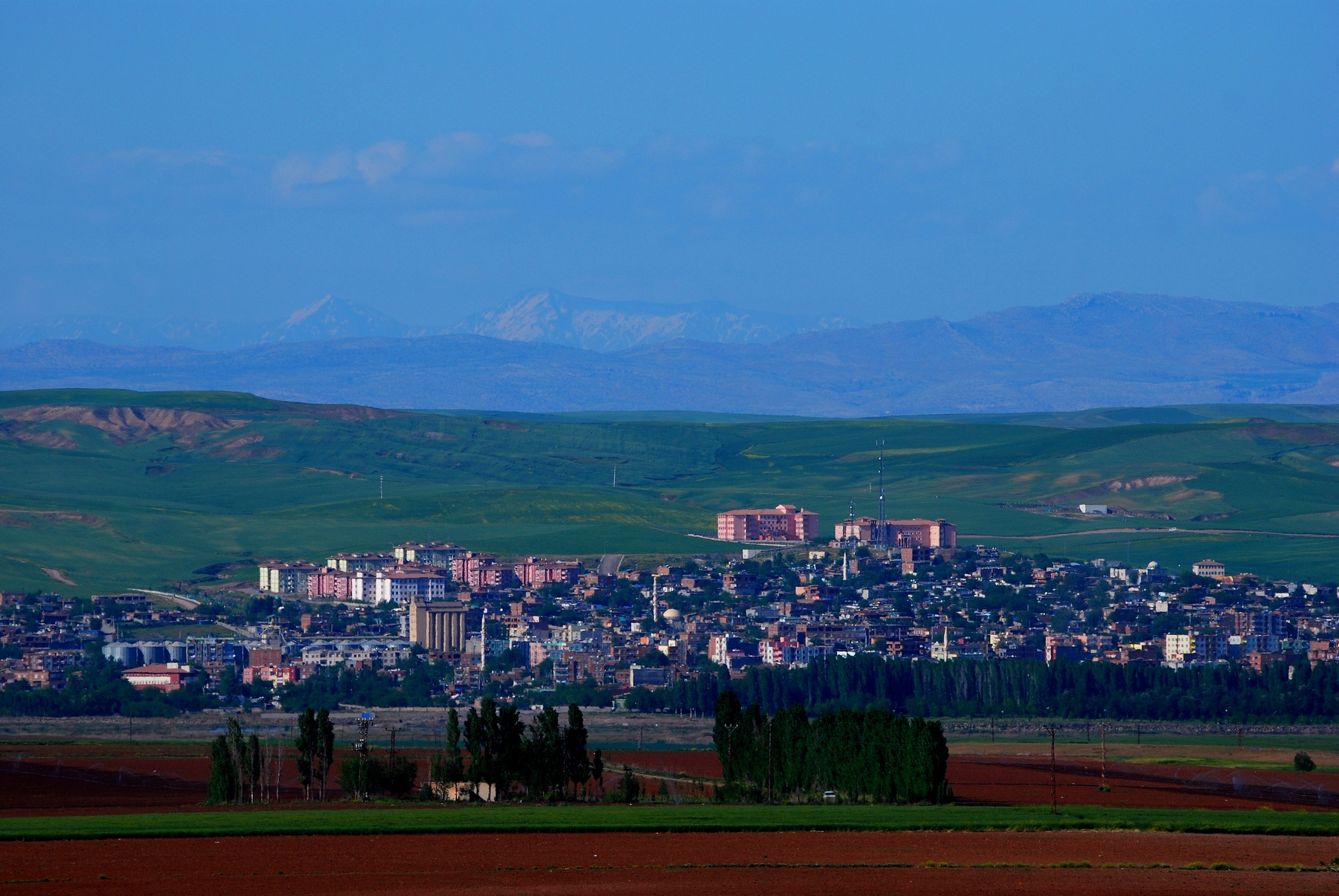

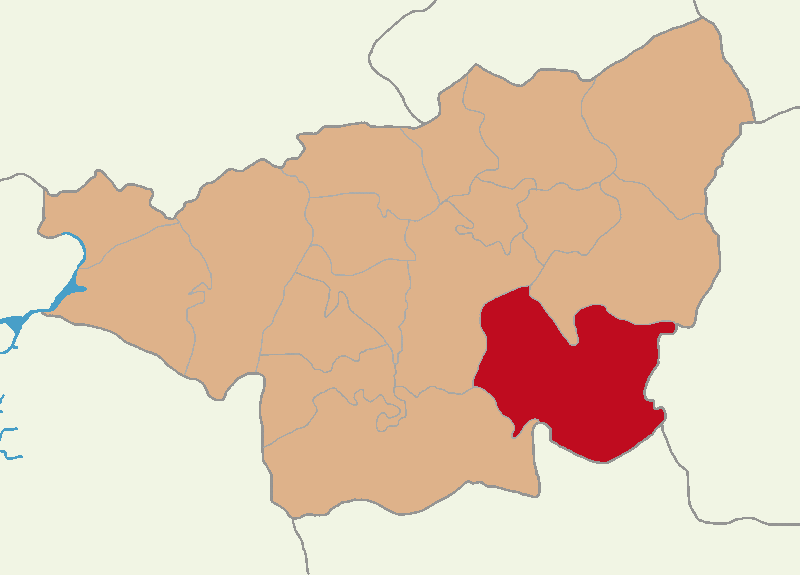
- Map showing Bismil District in Diyarbakır Province

- Location within Turkey
- Coordinates: 37°50′48″N 40°39′58″E
- Country: Turkey
- Province: Diyarbakır

Government
  - Mayor: Orhan Ayaz (HDP)
- Area: 1,679 km^{2} (648 sq mi)
- Population (2022): 118,698
  - Density: 70.70/km^{2} (183.1/sq mi)
- Time zone: UTC+3 (TRT)
- Postal code: 20930
- Area code: 0412
- Website: www.bismil.bel.tr

Bismil (Kurdish: Bismil) is a municipality and district of Diyarbakır Province, Turkey. Its area is 1,679 km^{2}, and its population is 118,698 (2022). The district was established on 4 January 1936.

== Neighborhoods ==
There are 122 neighbourhoods in Bismil District:

- Ağılköy
- Ağıllı
- Ahmetli
- Akbaş
- Akçay
- Akköy
- Akpınar
- Alibey
- Alıncak
- Altıok
- Aluç
- Ambar
- Aralık
- Arapkent
- Arıkgöl
- Aşağıdolay
- Aşağıoba
- Aslanoğlu
- Ataköy
- Aygeçti
- Babahaki
- Bademli
- Baharlı
- Bahçe
- Balcılar
- Başhan
- Başköy
- Başören
- Belli
- Bölümlü
- Boyacı
- Bozçalı
- Çakallı
- Çakıllı
- Çatalköy
- Çavuşlu
- Çeltikli
- Çölağan
- Çöltepe
- Çorapa
- Derbent
- Dicle
- Doruk
- Dumlupınar
- Eliaçık
- Erler
- Esentepe
- Fatih
- Fırat
- Gedikbaşı
- Göksu
- Güngeçti
- Güroluk
- Güzelköy
- Harmanlı
- Hasanpınar
- İsalı
- İsapınar
- Işıklar
- Kağıtlı
- Kamberli
- Kamışlı
- Karabörk
- Karacık
- Karaçölya
- Karagöz
- Karapınar
- Karatepe
- Karayiğit
- Kavuşak
- Kayıköy
- Kazancı
- Keberli
- Kılavuztepe
- Koğuk
- Kopmaz
- Köprüköy
- Kopuzlu
- Korukçu
- Köseli
- Koyunlu
- Kumrulu
- Kurtuluş
- Kurudeğirmen
- Kurudere
- Merdan
- Meydanlık
- Mirzabey
- Obalı
- Ofköy
- Oğuzlar
- Pınarbaşı
- Şahintepe
- Sanayi
- Sarıköy
- Sarıtoprak
- Sazlı
- Seki
- Şentepe
- Serçeler
- Seyit Hasan
- Seyrantepe
- Sinanköy
- Tatlıçayır
- Tekel
- Tepe
- Tepecik
- Tilkilik
- Topraklı
- Türkmenhacı
- Üçtepe
- Uğrak
- Uğurlu
- Ulutürk
- Uyanık
- Yağmurköy
- Yamaçköy
- Yasince
- Yenice
- Yukarıdolay
- Yukarıharım
- Yukarısalat

The pre-2013 municipality was divided into the neighborhoods of Akpınar, Altıok, Dicle, Dumlupınar, Esentepe, Fatih, Fırat, Kurtuluş, Sanayi, Seyrantepe, Şentepe, Tekel and Ulutürk.

== History ==
On the Körtik hill exists an archeological site.

== Politics ==
In the elections on the 31 March 2019 Orhan Ayaz from the Peoples' Democratic Party was elected as Mayor. But in October he got dismissed due to an investigation. A trustee was appointed instead.

== Notable people ==
- Özz Nûjen, comedian born in Bismil who later moved to Sweden
- Mehmet Mehdi Eker, former Minister of Food, Agriculture and Livestock
- Azize Tanrıkulu, Turkish taekwondo athlete
