= Aygeçti, Bismil =

Village in Turkey

Aygeçti
- Neighbourhood
- Location in Turkey
- Coordinates: 37°49′N 40°56′E
- Country: Turkey
- Province: Diyarbakır
- District: Bismil
- Population (2022): 60
- Time zone: UTC+3 (TRT)

Aygeçti is a neighbourhood in the municipality and district of Bismil, Diyarbakır Province in Turkey. Its population is 60 (2022).
