= Kopmaz, Bismil =

Village in Diyarbakır Province, Turkey

Kopmaz
- Neighbourhood
- Location in Turkey
- Coordinates: 37.763°N 40.916°E
- Country: Turkey
- Province: Diyarbakır
- District: Bismil
- Population (2022): 41
- Time zone: UTC+3 (TRT)

Kopmaz (Kurdish: Girmalik) is a neighbourhood in the municipality and district of Bismil, Diyarbakır Province in Turkey. The village is populated by Kurds of the Dereverî tribe and had a population of 41 in 2022.
