= Alıncak, Bismil =

Village in Turkey

Alıncak
- Neighbourhood
- Location in Turkey
- Coordinates: 37°58′N 40°57′E
- Country: Turkey
- Province: Diyarbakır
- District: Bismil
- Population (2022): 125
- Time zone: UTC+3 (TRT)

Alıncak is a neighbourhood in the municipality and district of Bismil, Diyarbakır Province in Turkey. Its population is 125 (2022).
