= Çorapa, Bismil =

Village in Turkey

Çorapa
- Neighbourhood
- Country: Turkey
- Province: Diyarbakır
- District: Bismil
- Population (2022): 151
- Time zone: UTC+3 (TRT)

Çorapa (formerly: Gültepe) is a neighbourhood in the municipality and district of Bismil, Diyarbakır Province in Turkey. Its population is 151 (2022).
