= Türkmenhacı, Bismil =

Village in Diyarbakır Province, Turkey

Türkmenhacı
- Neighbourhood
- Location in Turkey
- Coordinates: 37.806°N 40.606°E
- Country: Turkey
- Province: Diyarbakır
- District: Bismil
- Population (2022): 739
- Time zone: UTC+3 (TRT)

Türkmenhacı (Kurdish: Haciya tirka) is a neighbourhood in the municipality and district of Bismil, Diyarbakır Province in Turkey. It is populated by Kurds and Turkmens had a population of 739 in 2022.
