= Yukarıharım, Bismil =

Village in Diyarbakır Province, Turkey

Yukarıharım
- Neighbourhood
- Location in Turkey
- Coordinates: 37.920°N 40.708°E
- Country: Turkey
- Province: Diyarbakır
- District: Bismil
- Population (2022): 507
- Time zone: UTC+3 (TRT)

Yukarıharım (Kurdish: Mezrê) is a neighbourhood in the municipality and district of Bismil, Diyarbakır Province in Turkey. The village is populated by Kurds had a population of 507 in 2022.
