= Ağılköy, Bismil =

Village in Diyarbakır Province, Turkey

Ağılköy
- Neighbourhood
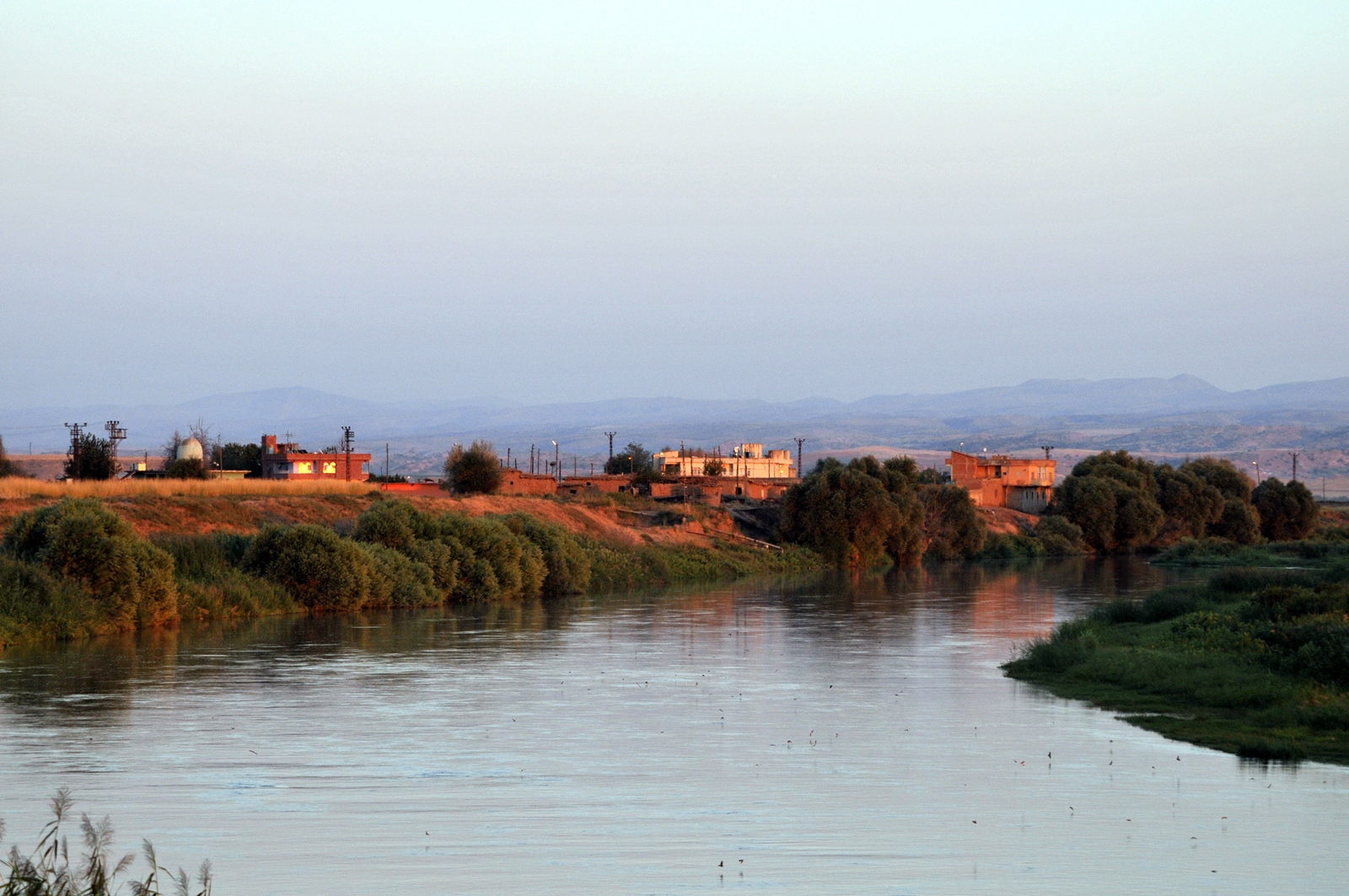

- Location within Turkey
- Coordinates: 37°48′46″N 40°58′09″E
- Country: Turkey
- Province: Diyarbakır
- District: Bismil
- Population (2022): 53
- Time zone: UTC+3 (TRT)

Ağılköy (Kurdish: Incolînê) is a neighbourhood in the municipality and district of Bismil, Diyarbakır Province in Turkey. The village is populated by Kurds of the Dereverî tribe and had a population of 53 in 2022.
