= Başköy, Bismil =

Village in Diyarbakır Province, Turkey

Başköy
- Neighbourhood
- Location in Turkey
- Coordinates: 37.989°N 40.905°E
- Country: Turkey
- Province: Diyarbakır
- District: Bismil
- Population (2022): 74
- Time zone: UTC+3 (TRT)

Başköy (Kurdish: Başko) is a neighbourhood in the municipality and district of Bismil, Diyarbakır Province in Turkey. The village is populated by Kurds and had a population of 74 in 2022. The village is Yazidi.
