= Kayıköy, Bismil =

Village in Turkey

Kayıköy
- Neighbourhood
- Country: Turkey
- Province: Diyarbakır
- District: Bismil
- Population (2022): 187
- Time zone: UTC+3 (TRT)

Kayıköy is a neighbourhood in the municipality and district of Bismil, Diyarbakır Province in Turkey. Its population is 187 (2022).
