= Oğuzlar, Bismil =

Village in Turkey

Oğuzlar
- Neighbourhood
- Location in Turkey
- Coordinates: 38°03′40″N 40°36′25″E
- Country: Turkey
- Province: Diyarbakır
- District: Bismil
- Population (2022): 128
- Time zone: UTC+3 (TRT)

Oğuzlar (Kurdish: Qerexan) is a neighbourhood in the municipality and district of Bismil, Diyarbakır Province in Turkey. It is populated by Kurds and had a population of 128 in 2022.
