= Kağıtlı, Bismil =

Village in Turkey

Kağıtlı
- Neighbourhood
- Location in Turkey
- Coordinates: 38°02′07″N 40°31′27″E
- Country: Turkey
- Province: Diyarbakır
- District: Bismil
- Population (2022): 156
- Time zone: UTC+3 (TRT)

Kağıtlı is a neighbourhood in the municipality and district of Bismil, Diyarbakır Province in Turkey. Its population is 156 (2022).
