= Çöltepe, Bismil =

Village in Turkey

Çöltepe
- Neighbourhood
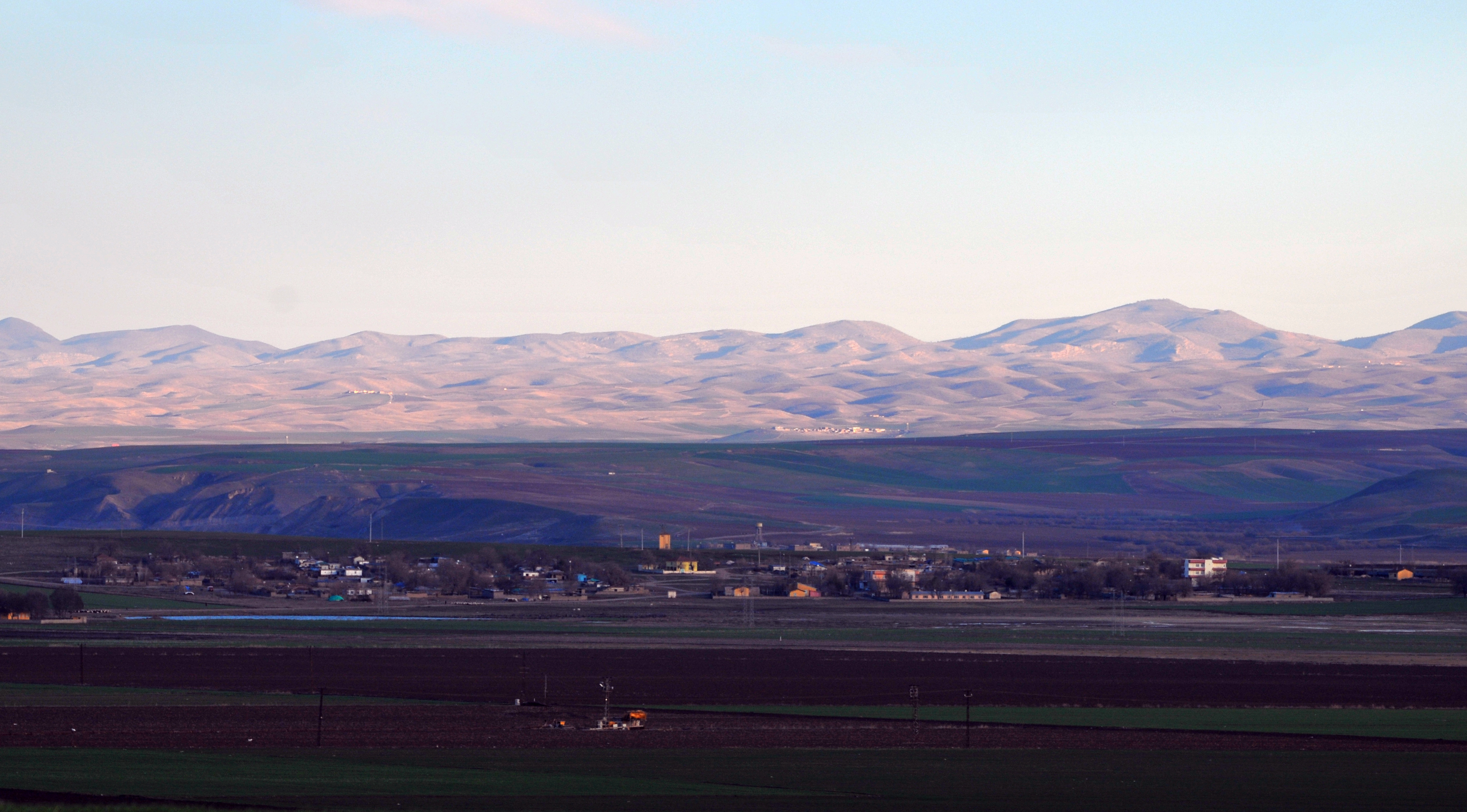

- Location within Turkey
- Coordinates: 37°51′N 40°48′E
- Country: Turkey
- Province: Diyarbakır
- District: Bismil
- Population (2022): 319
- Time zone: UTC+3 (TRT)

Çöltepe (Kurdish: Çoltepe) is a neighbourhood in the municipality and district of Bismil, Diyarbakır Province in Turkey. It is populated by Kurds and had a population of 319 in 2022.
