= Bölümlü, Bismil =

Village in Turkey

Bölümlü
- Neighbourhood
- Location in Turkey
- Coordinates: 37.7091°N 40.5822°E
- Country: Turkey
- Province: Diyarbakır
- District: Bismil
- Population (2022): 113
- Time zone: UTC+3 (TRT)

Bölümlü (Kurdish: Qasimiyê) is a neighbourhood in the municipality and district of Bismil, Diyarbakır Province in Turkey. It is populated by Kurds and had a population of 113 in 2022.
