= Uğrak, Bismil =

Village in Diyarbakır Province, Turkey

Uğrak
- Neighbourhood
- Location in Turkey
- Coordinates: 37.997°N 40.833°E
- Country: Turkey
- Province: Diyarbakır
- District: Bismil
- Population (2022): 95
- Time zone: UTC+3 (TRT)

Uğrak (Kurdish: Cadê) is a neighbourhood in the municipality and district of Bismil, Diyarbakır Province in Turkey. The village is populated by Kurds and had a population of 95 in 2022.

The village was depopulated in 1994 until 2000.
