= Koğuk, Bismil =

Village in Diyarbakır Province, Turkey

Koğuk
- Neighbourhood
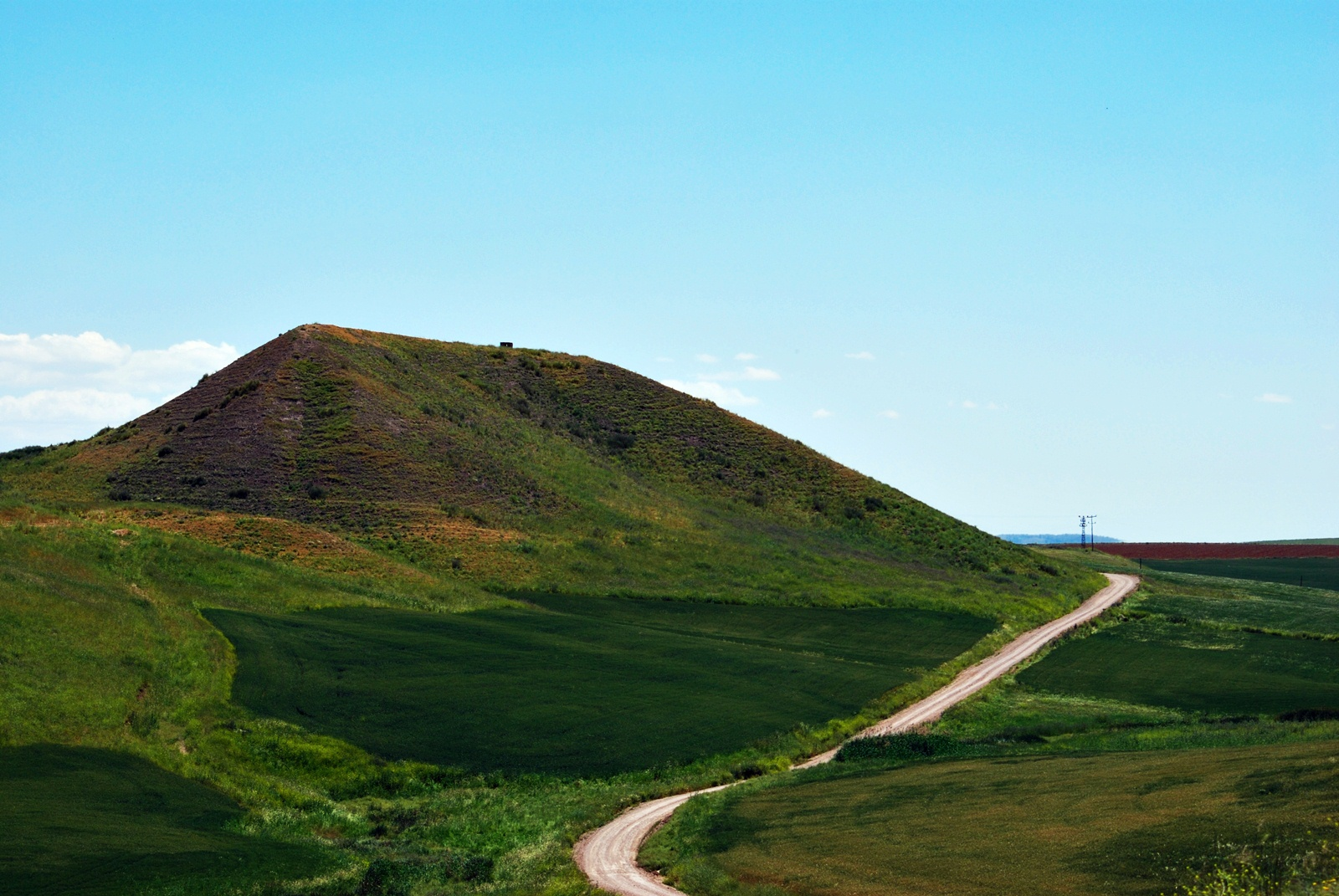

- Location within Turkey
- Coordinates: 37.741°N 40.724°E
- Country: Turkey
- Province: Diyarbakır
- District: Bismil
- Population (2022): 64
- Time zone: UTC+3 (TRT)

Koğuk (Kurdish: Koxî) is a neighbourhood in the municipality and district of Bismil, Diyarbakır Province in Turkey. The village is populated by Kurds of the Barava tribe and had a population of 64 in 2022.
