= Göksu, Bismil =

Village in Turkey

Göksu
- Neighbourhood
- Location in Turkey
- Coordinates: 37.83°N 40.553°E
- Country: Turkey
- Province: Diyarbakır
- District: Bismil
- Population (2022): 731
- Time zone: UTC+3 (TRT)

Göksu is a neighbourhood in the municipality and district of Bismil, Diyarbakır Province in Turkey. Its population is 731 (2022).
