= Başören, Bismil =

Village in Turkey

Başören
- Neighbourhood
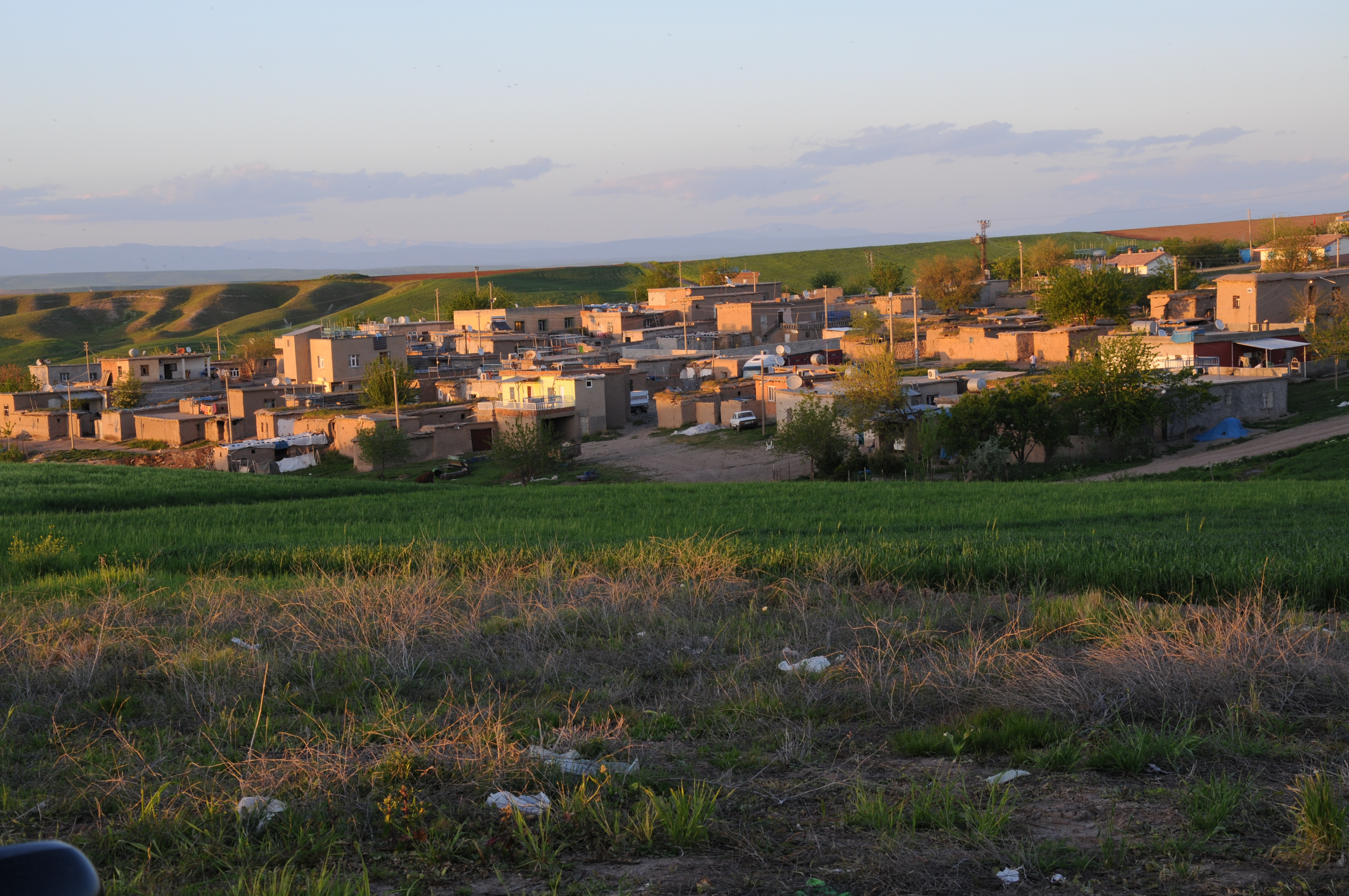

- Location within Turkey
- Coordinates: 37.7628°N 40.7436°E
- Country: Turkey
- Province: Diyarbakır
- District: Bismil
- Population (2022): 321
- Time zone: UTC+3 (TRT)

Başören is a neighbourhood in the municipality and district of Bismil, Diyarbakır Province in Turkey. Its population is 321 (2022).
