= Karacık, Bismil =

Village in Turkey

Karacık
- Neighbourhood
- Country: Turkey
- Province: Diyarbakır
- District: Bismil
- Population (2022): 47
- Time zone: UTC+3 (TRT)

Karacık is a neighbourhood in the municipality and district of Bismil, Diyarbakır Province in Turkey. Its population is 47 (2022).

The climate is Mediterranean. The average temperature is 20 °C. The hottest month is July, at 37 °C, and the coldest is January, at 3 °C. The average rainfall is 731 mm per year. The wettest month is December, at 124 mm of rain, and the driest is August, at 1 mm. </references>
