= Kamışlı, Bismil =

Village in Turkey

Kamışlı
- Neighbourhood
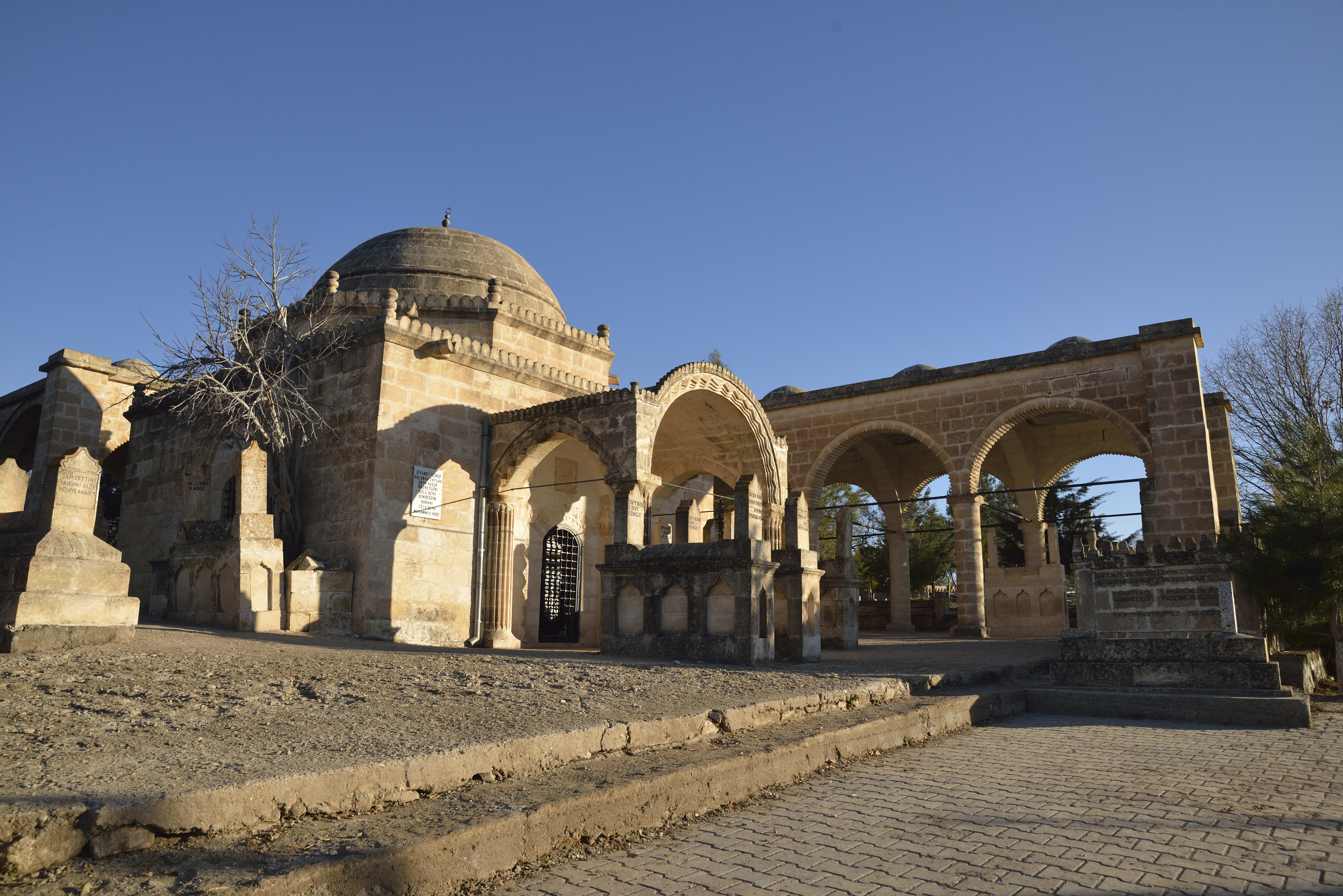

- Location within Turkey
- Coordinates: 37.969016°N 40.834006°E
- Country: Turkey
- Province: Diyarbakır
- District: Bismil
- Population (2022): 111
- Time zone: UTC+3 (TRT)

Kamışlı is a neighbourhood in the municipality and district of Bismil, Diyarbakır Province in Turkey. Its population is 111 (2022).
