= Bahçe, Bismil =

Village in Turkey

Bahçe
- Neighbourhood
- Location in Turkey
- Coordinates: 37.9598°N 40.7425°E
- Country: Turkey
- Province: Diyarbakır
- District: Bismil
- Population (2022): 143
- Time zone: UTC+3 (TRT)

Bahçe (Kurdish: Mara) is a neighbourhood in the municipality and district of Bismil, Diyarbakır Province in Turkey. It is populated by Kurds and had a population of 143 in 2022.
