= Başhan, Bismil =

Village in Diyarbakır Province, Turkey

Başhan
- Neighbourhood
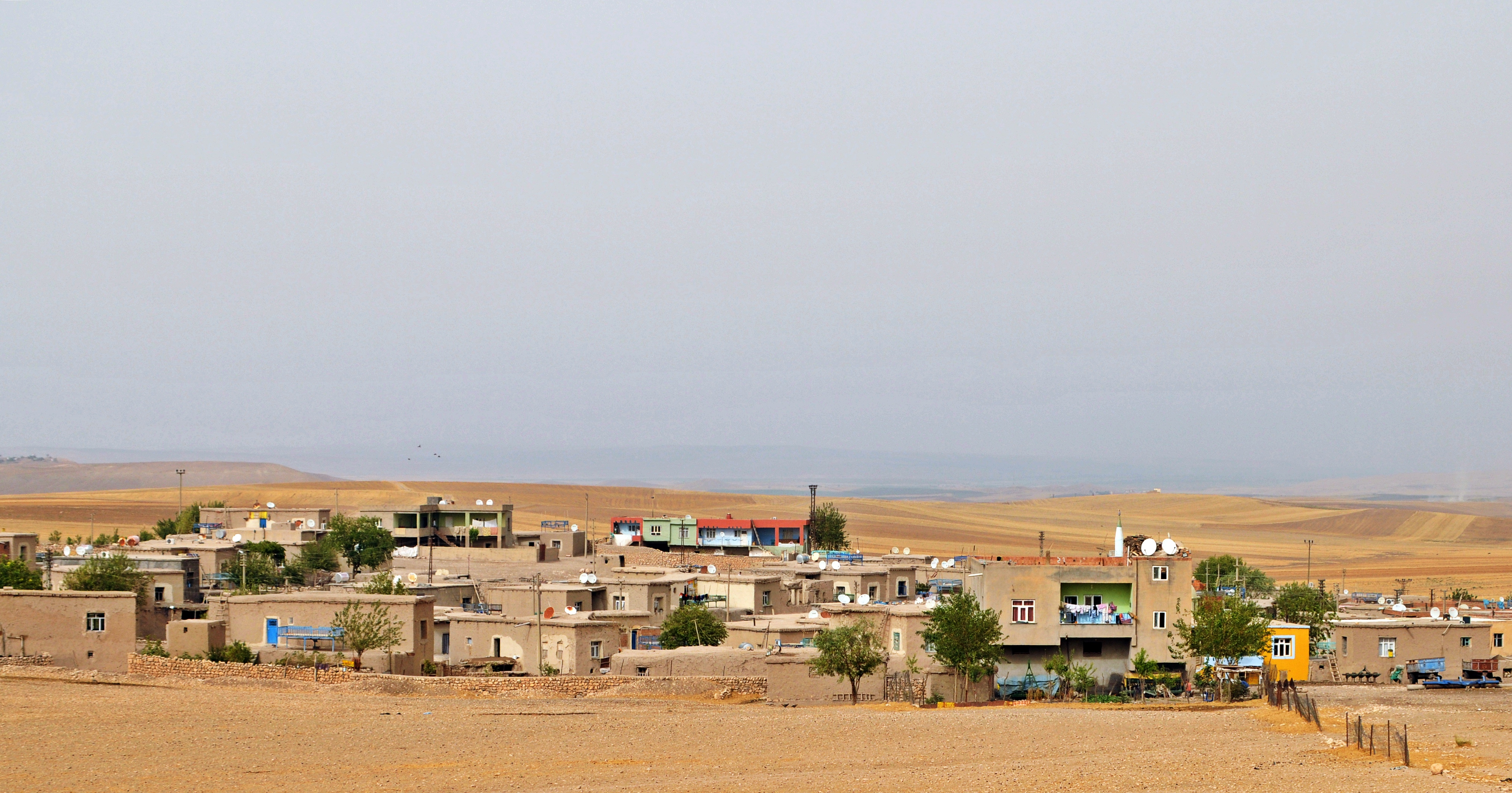

- Location within Turkey
- Coordinates: 37.699°N 40.912°E
- Country: Turkey
- Province: Diyarbakır
- District: Bismil
- Population (2022): 479
- Time zone: UTC+3 (TRT)

Başhan (Kurdish: Xanuserê) is a neighbourhood in the municipality and district of Bismil, Diyarbakır Province in Turkey. The village is populated by Kurds of the Barava tribe and had a population of 479 in 2022.
