= Kopuzlu, Bismil =

Village in Turkey

Kopuzlu
- Neighbourhood
- Country: Turkey
- Province: Diyarbakır
- District: Bismil
- Population (2022): 399
- Time zone: UTC+3 (TRT)

Kopuzlu is a neighbourhood in the municipality and district of Bismil, Diyarbakır Province in Turkey. Its population is 399 (2022).
