= Derbent, Bismil =

Village in Turkey

Derbent
- Neighbourhood
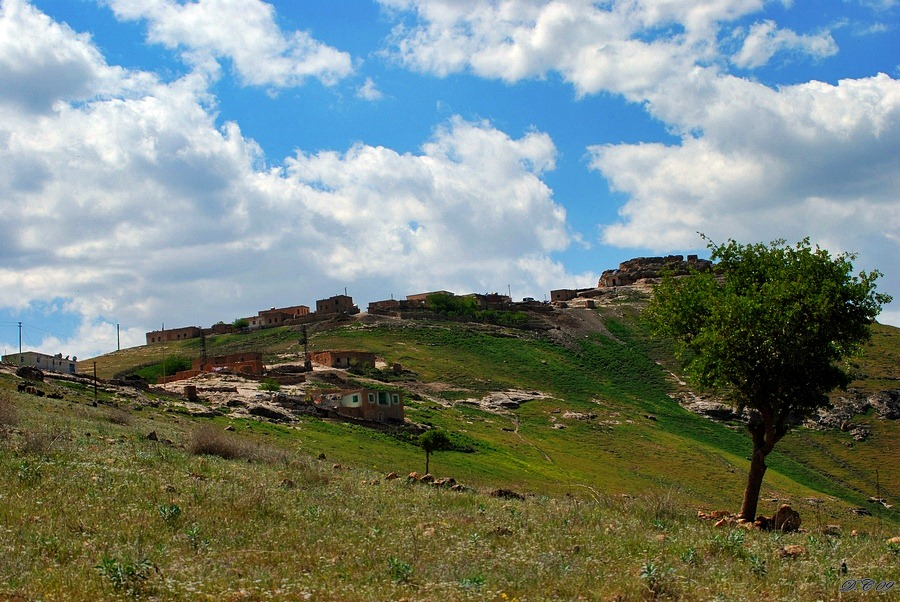

- Location within Turkey
- Coordinates: 37.650°N 40.882°E
- Country: Turkey
- Province: Diyarbakır
- District: Bismil
- Population (2022): 102
- Time zone: UTC+3 (TRT)

Derbent (Kurdish: Dêrbendê) is a neighbourhood in the municipality and district of Bismil, Diyarbakır Province in Turkey. It is populated by Kurds and had a population of 102 in 2022.
