= Köseli, Bismil =

Village in Diyarbakır Province, Turkey

Köseli
- Neighbourhood
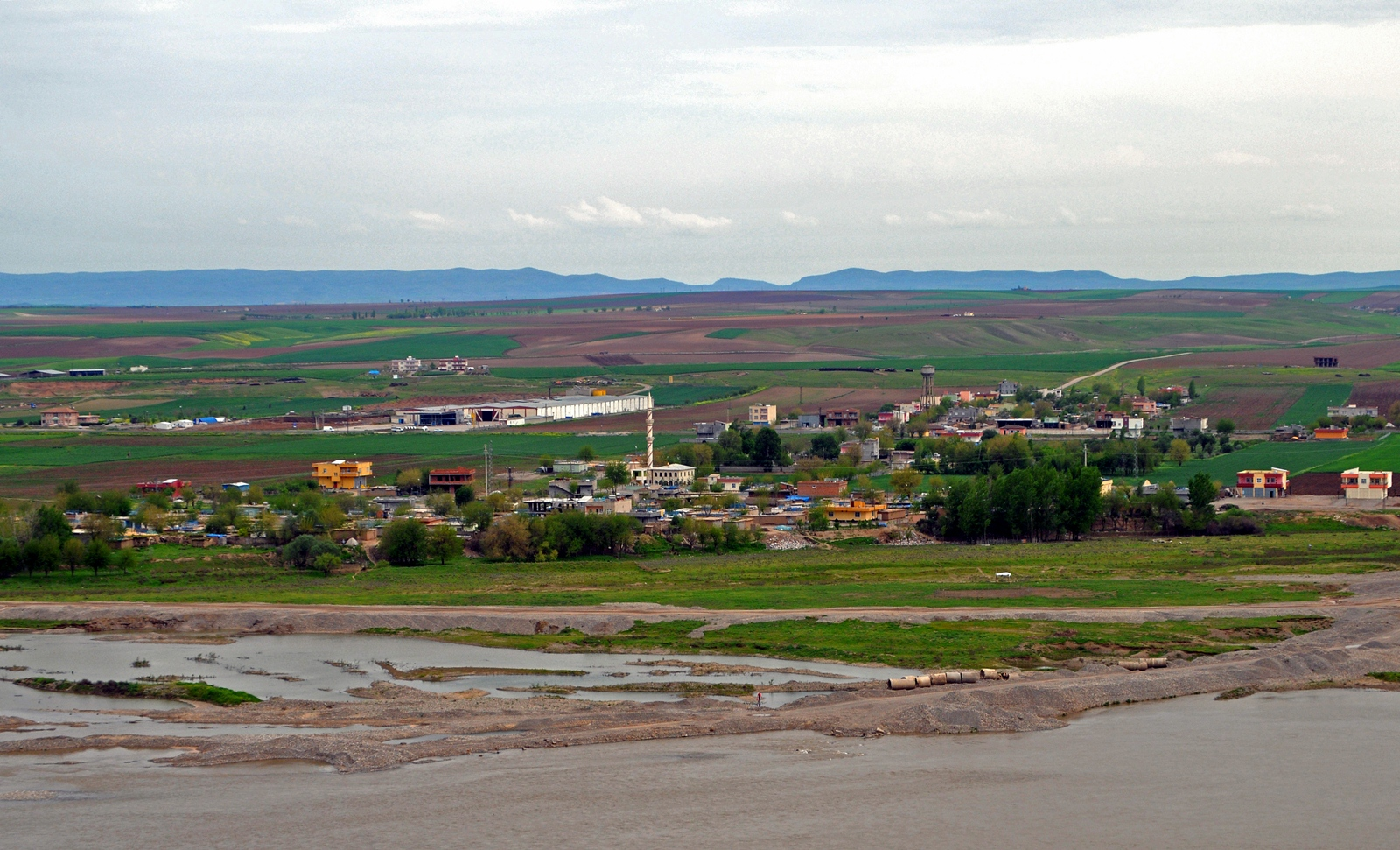

- Location within Turkey
- Coordinates: 37.843°N 40.608°E
- Country: Turkey
- Province: Diyarbakır
- District: Bismil
- Population (2022): 2,842
- Time zone: UTC+3 (TRT)

Köseli is a neighbourhood in the municipality and district of Bismil, Diyarbakır Province in Turkey. The village is populated by Turkmens who adhere to Alevism and by Kurds of the Bekiran tribe. It had a population of 2,842 in 2022.
