= Seki, Bismil =

Village in Turkey

Seki
- Neighbourhood
- Coordinates
- Country: Turkey
- Province: Diyarbakır
- District: Bismil
- Population (2022): 248
- Time zone: UTC+3 (TRT)

Seki is a neighbourhood in the municipality and district of Bismil, Diyarbakır Province in Turkey. Its population is 248 (2022).
