= Bozçalı, Bismil =

Village in Turkey

Bozçalı
- Neighbourhood
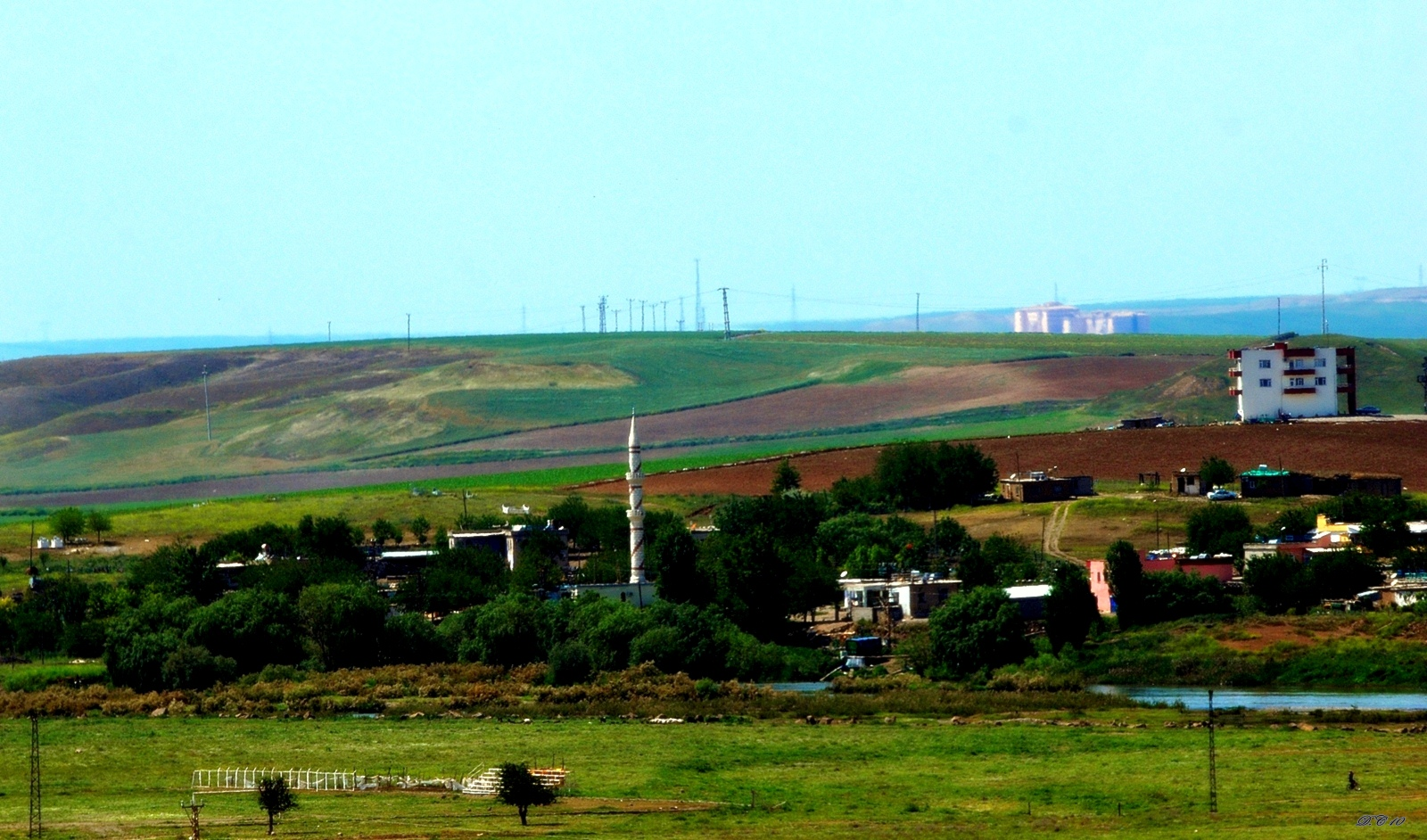

- Location within Turkey
- Coordinates: 37.8068°N 40.7670°E
- Country: Turkey
- Province: Diyarbakır
- District: Bismil
- Population (2022): 252
- Time zone: UTC+3 (TRT)

Bozçalı (Kurdish: Boçelî) is a neighbourhood in the municipality and district of Bismil, Diyarbakır Province in Turkey. It is populated by Kurds and had a population of 252 in 2022.
