= Yağmurköy, Bismil =

Village in Diyarbakır Province, Turkey

Yağmurköy
- Neighbourhood
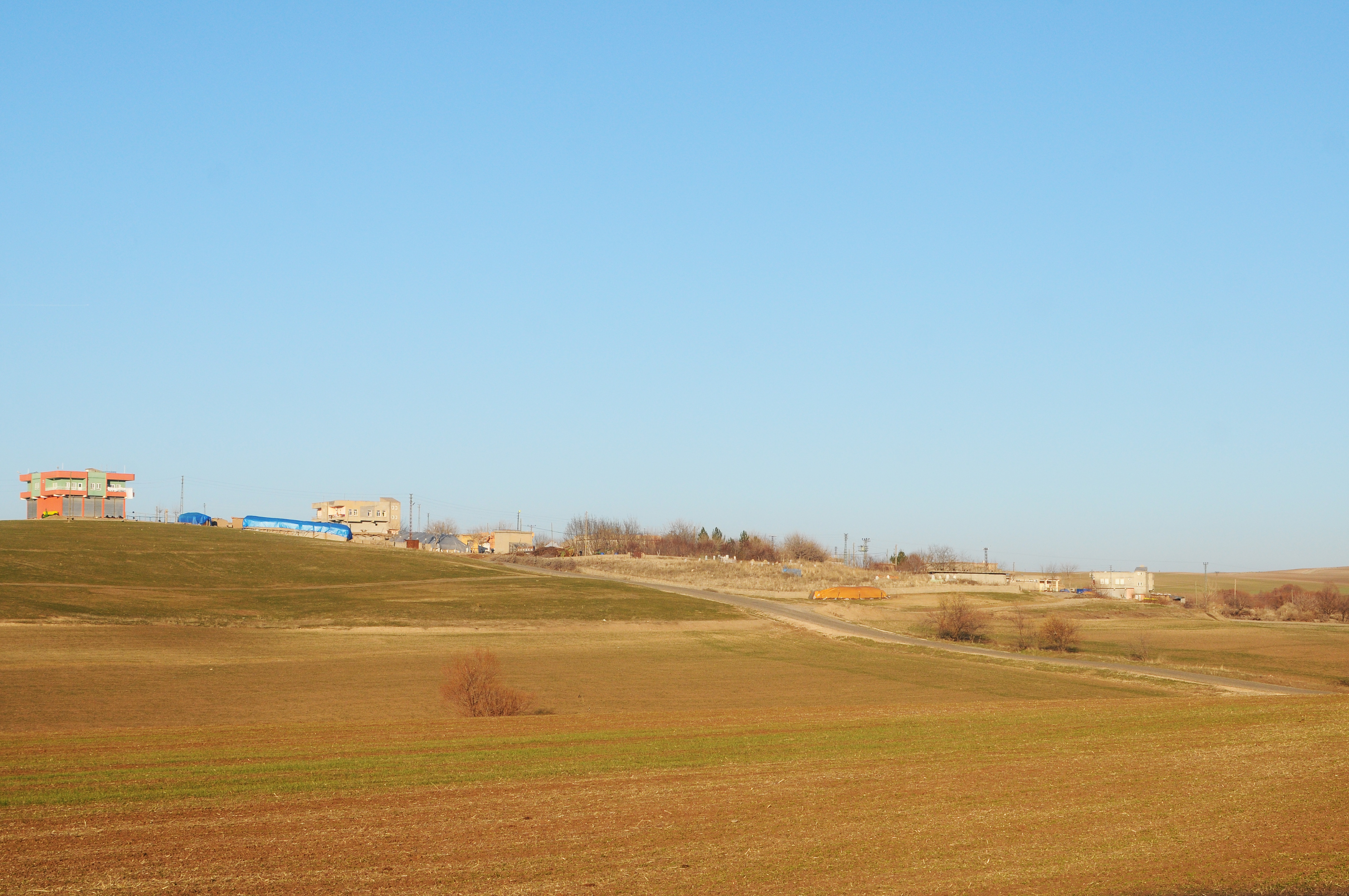

- Location within Turkey
- Coordinates: 37.927°N 40.888°E
- Country: Turkey
- Province: Diyarbakır
- District: Bismil
- Population (2022): 131
- Time zone: UTC+3 (TRT)

Yağmurköy (Kurdish: Dirikê) is a neighbourhood in the municipality and district of Bismil, Diyarbakır Province in Turkey. The village is populated by Kurds of the Reşkotan tribe and had a population of 131 in 2022.
