= Kamberli, Bismil =

Village in Turkey

Kamberli
- Neighbourhood
- Location in Turkey
- Coordinates: 37.759°N 40.817°E
- Country: Turkey
- Province: Diyarbakır
- District: Bismil
- Population (2022): 187
- Time zone: UTC+3 (TRT)

Kamberli (Kurdish: Barava) is a neighbourhood in the municipality and district of Bismil, Diyarbakır Province in Turkey. The village is populated by Kurds of the Barava tribe and had a population of 187 in 2022.
