= Aslanoğlu, Bismil =

Village in Diyarbakır Province, Turkey

Aslanoğlu
- Neighbourhood
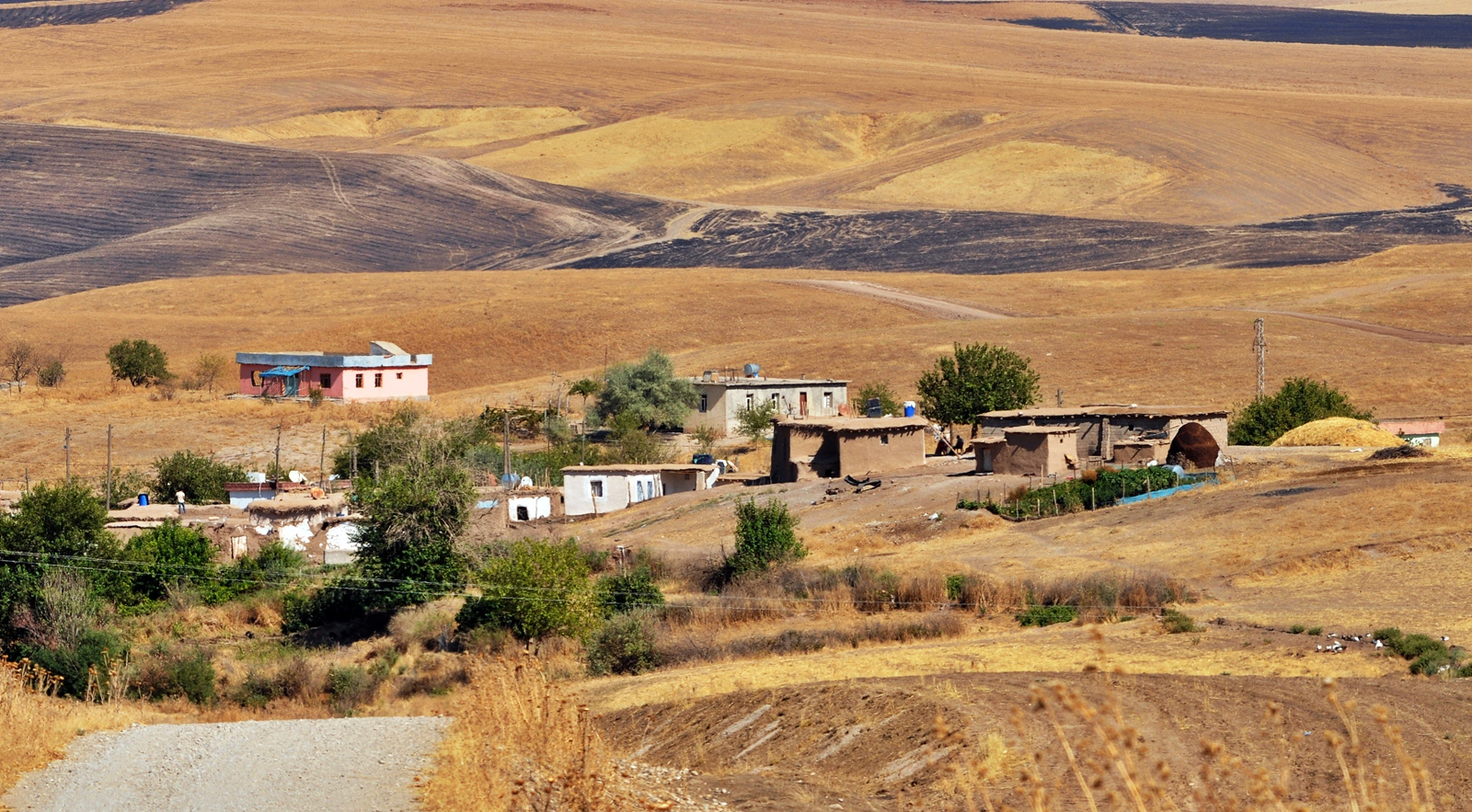

- Location within Turkey
- Coordinates: 38.002°N 40.582°E
- Country: Turkey
- Province: Diyarbakır
- District: Bismil
- Population (2022): 112
- Time zone: UTC+3 (TRT)

Aslanoğlu (Kurdish: Eslanoxlî) is a neighbourhood in the municipality and district of Bismil, Diyarbakır Province in Turkey. The village is populated by Kurds of the Şêxan tribe and had a population of 112 in 2022.
