= Güroluk, Bismil =

Village in Diyarbakır Province, Turkey

Güroluk
- Neighbourhood
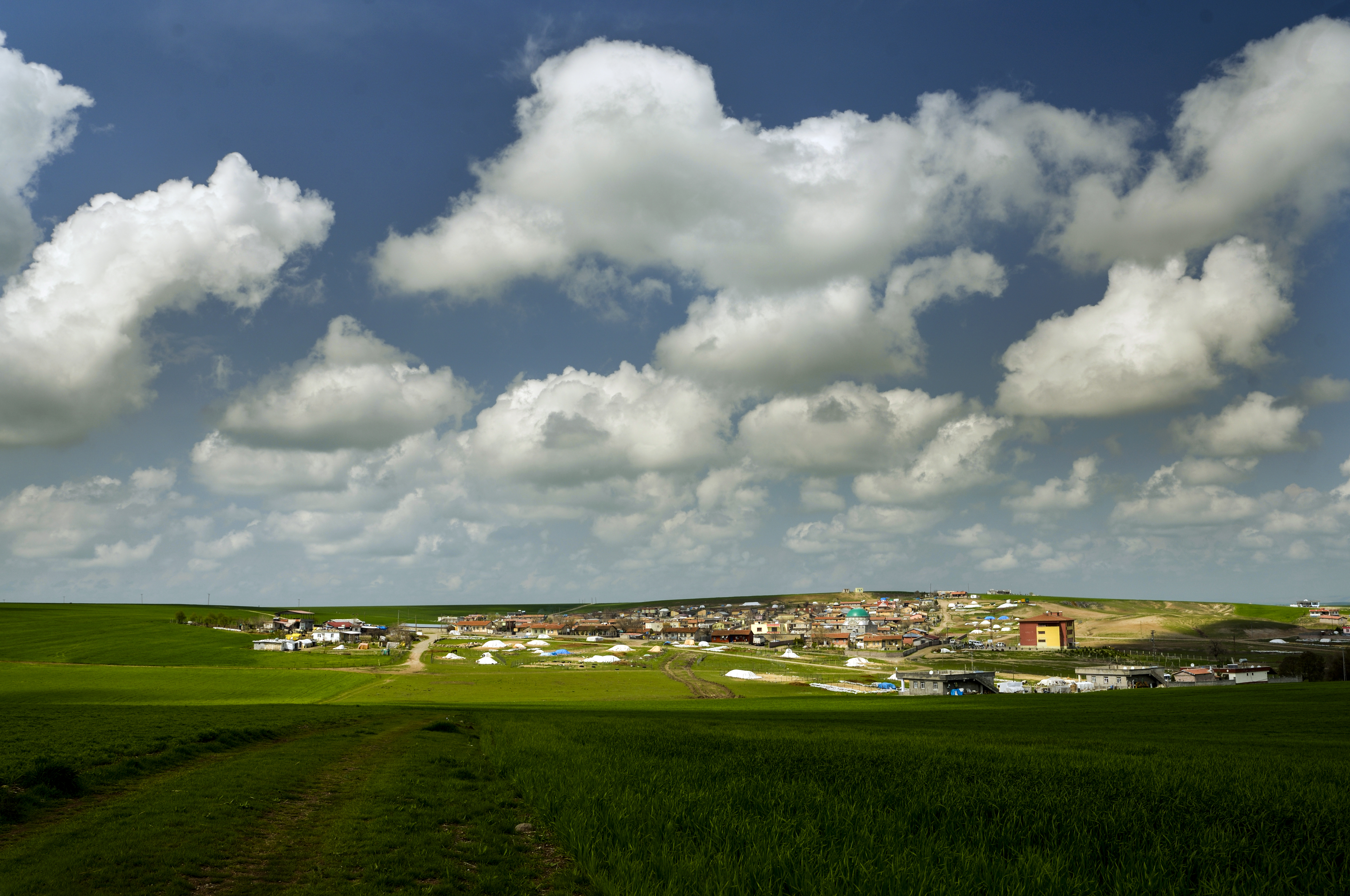

- Location within Turkey
- Coordinates: 38.029°N 40.559°E
- Country: Turkey
- Province: Diyarbakır
- District: Bismil
- Population (2022): 639
- Time zone: UTC+3 (TRT)

Güroluk (Kurdish: Qeselê) is a neighbourhood in the municipality and district of Bismil, Diyarbakır Province in Turkey. The village is populated by Kurds of the Beritan tribe and had a population of 639 in 2022.
