= Güzelköy, Bismil =

Village in Diyarbakır Province, Turkey

Güzelköy
- Neighbourhood
- Location in Turkey
- Coordinates: 37.732°N 41.000°E
- Country: Turkey
- Province: Diyarbakır
- District: Bismil
- Population (2022): 236
- Time zone: UTC+3 (TRT)

Güzelköy (Kurdish: Sindisê) is a neighbourhood in the municipality and district of Bismil, Diyarbakır Province in Turkey. The village is populated by Kurds of the Barava tribe and had a population of 236 in 2022.
