= Işıklar, Bismil =

Village in Turkey

Işıklar
- Neighbourhood
- Country: Turkey
- Province: Diyarbakır
- District: Bismil
- Population (2022): 335
- Time zone: UTC+3 (TRT)

Işıklar is a neighbourhood in the municipality and district of Bismil, Diyarbakır Province in Turkey. Its population is 335 (2022).
