= Baharlı, Bismil =

Village in Turkey

Baharlı
- Neighbourhood
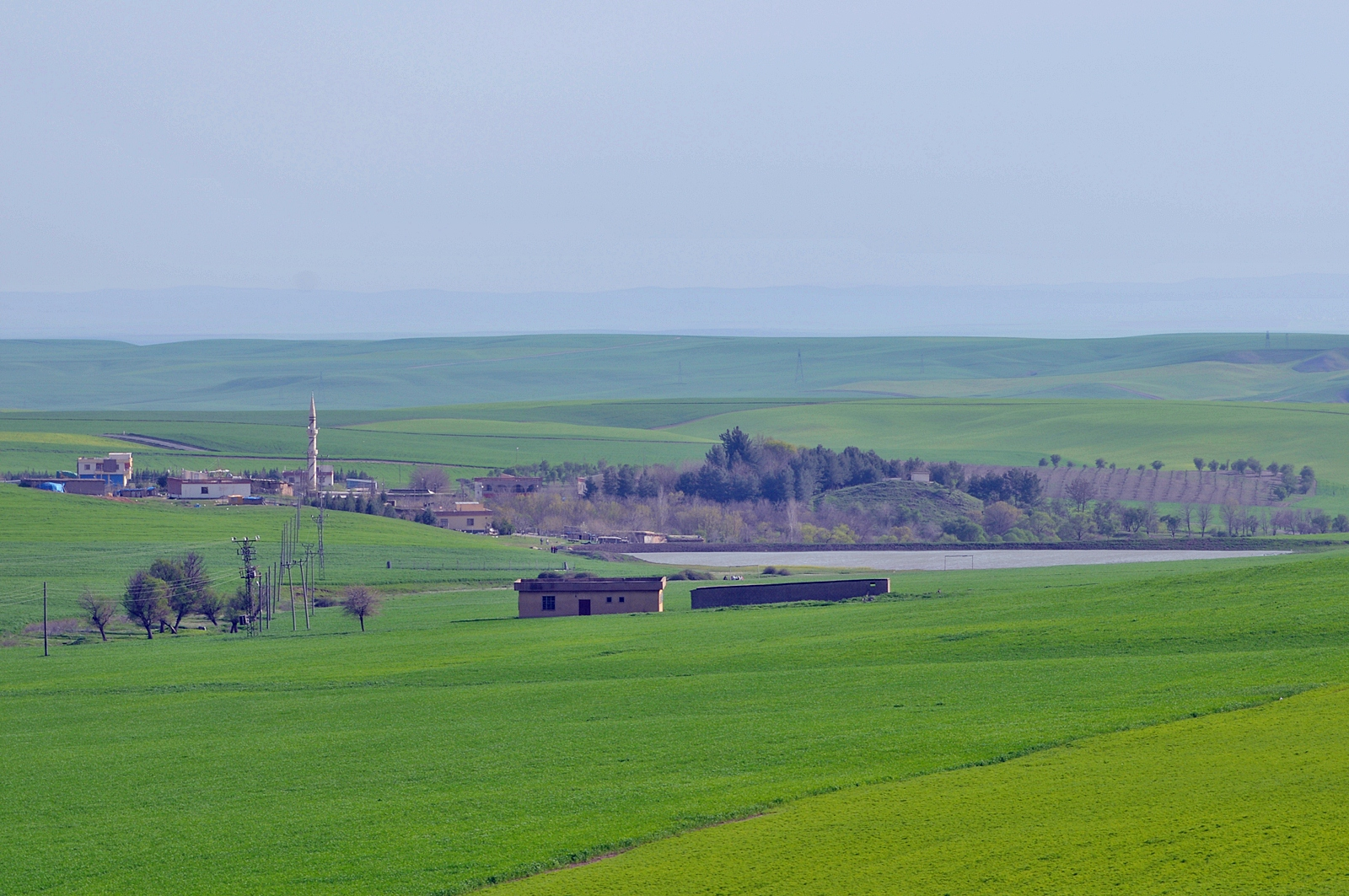
- Aşağı Horozlu hamlet

- Location within Turkey
- Coordinates: 37.9826°N 40.5721°E
- Country: Turkey
- Province: Diyarbakır
- District: Bismil
- Population (2022): 274
- Time zone: UTC+3 (TRT)

Baharlı is a neighbourhood in the municipality and district of Bismil, Diyarbakır Province in Turkey. Its population is 274 as of 2022.
