= Akçay, Bismil =

Village in Turkey

Akçay
- Neighbourhood
- Location in Turkey
- Coordinates: 38.0189°N 40.6701°E
- Country: Turkey
- Province: Diyarbakır
- District: Bismil
- Population (2022): 97
- Time zone: UTC+3 (TRT)

Akçay is a neighbourhood in the municipality and district of Bismil, Diyarbakır Province in Turkey. Its population is 97 (2022).
