= Alibey, Bismil =

Village in Diyarbakır Province, Turkey

Alibey
- Neighbourhood
- Location in Turkey
- Coordinates: 37.941°N 40.821°E
- Country: Turkey
- Province: Diyarbakır
- District: Bismil
- Population (2022): 629
- Time zone: UTC+3 (TRT)

Alibey (Kurdish: Elodîna) is a neighbourhood in the municipality and district of Bismil, Diyarbakır Province in Turkey. The village is populated by Kurds of the Beritan tribe and had a population of 629 in 2022.
