= Çeltikli, Bismil =

Village in Diyarbakır Province, Turkey

Çeltikli
- Neighbourhood
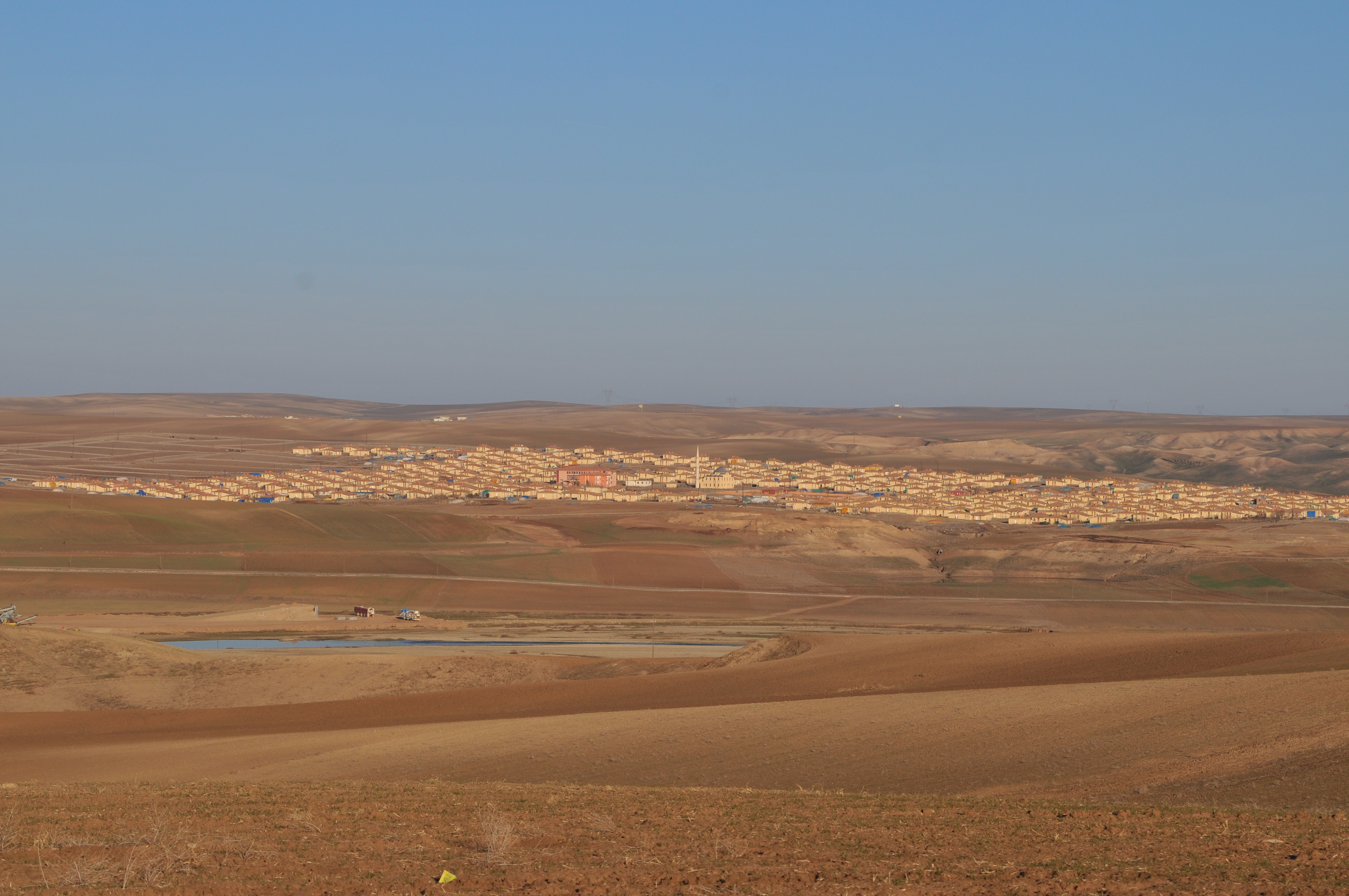

- Location within Turkey
- Coordinates: 37.884°N 40.884°E
- Country: Turkey
- Province: Diyarbakır
- District: Bismil
- Population (2022): 1,447
- Time zone: UTC+3 (TRT)

Çeltikli (Kurdish: Mîrkulyan) is a neighbourhood in the municipality and district of Bismil, Diyarbakır Province in Turkey. The village is populated by Kurds of the Beritan tribe and had a population of 1,447 in 2022.
