= Aralık, Bismil =

Village in Turkey

Aralık
- Neighbourhood
- Location in Turkey
- Coordinates: 37.8308°N 40.6796°E
- Country: Turkey
- Province: Diyarbakır
- District: Bismil
- Population (2022): 4,653
- Time zone: UTC+3 (TRT)

Aralık is a neighbourhood in the municipality and district of Bismil, Diyarbakır Province in Turkey. Its population is 4,653 (2022).
