= List of populated places in Diyarbakır Province =

Places in Turkey

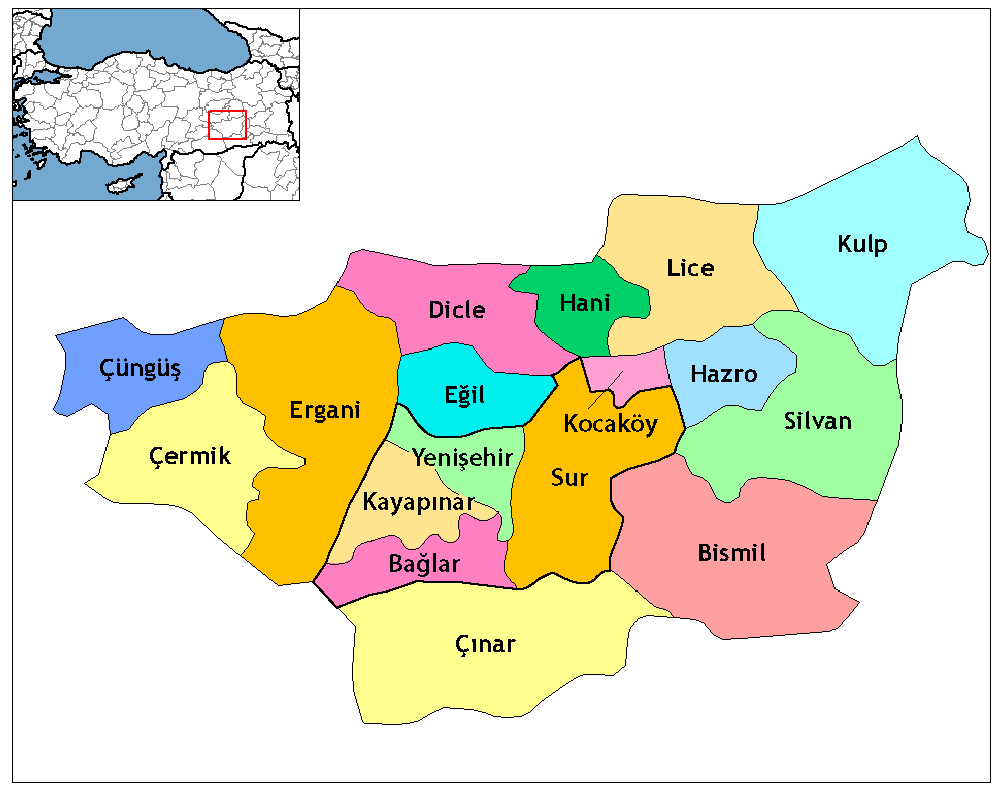
Diyarbakır Province

Below is the list of populated places in Diyarbakır Province, Turkey by the districts.

== Bağlar ==
Bağlar

- 5 Nisan
- Ağaçgeçit
- Alankoz
- Alipınar
- Bağcılar
- Batıçanakçı
- Batıkarakoç
- Buçuktepe
- Buyuransu
- Çiçekliyurt
- Çiftlik
- Develi
- Ekince
- Fatih
- Gömmetaş
- Kabahıdır
- Kamışpınar
- Karacadağ
- Karahanköy
- Karamus
- Kaynartepe
- Kırkıncık
- Kırkkoyun
- Kolludere
- Körhat
- Körtepe
- Mevlana Halit
- Muradiye
- Oğlaklı
- Ortaören
- Övündüler
- Özdemir
- Pınaroğlu
- Sakallı
- Sarıdallı
- Selahattini Eyyubi
- Şeyh Şamil
- Tavşantepe
- Tellikaya
- Tokluca
- Topraktaş
- Topyolu
- Uzunbahçe
- Yeniköy
- Yeşildallı
- Yiğityolu
- Yukarıakdibek
- Yukarımollaali
- Yunus Emre

== Bismil ==
Bismil

- Ağılköy
- Ağıllı
- Ahmetli
- Akbaş
- Akçay
- Akköy
- Akpınar
- Alibey
- Alıncak
- Altıok
- Aluç
- Ambar
- Aralık
- Arapkent
- Arıkgöl
- Aşağıdolay
- Aşağıoba
- Aslanoğlu
- Ataköy
- Aygeçti
- Babahaki
- Bademli
- Baharlı
- Bahçe
- Balcılar
- Başhan
- Başköy
- Başören
- Belli
- Bölümlü
- Boyacı
- Bozçalı
- Çakallı
- Çakıllı
- Çatalköy
- Çavuşlu
- Çeltikli
- Çölağan
- Çöltepe
- Çorapa
- Derbent
- Dicle
- Doruk
- Dumlupınar
- Eliaçık
- Erler
- Esentepe
- Fatih
- Fırat
- Gedikbaşı
- Göksu
- Güngeçti
- Güroluk
- Güzelköy
- Harmanlı
- Hasanpınar
- İsalı
- İsapınar
- Işıklar
- Kağıtlı
- Kamberli
- Kamışlı
- Karabörk
- Karacık
- Karaçölya
- Karagöz
- Karapınar
- Karatepe
- Karayiğit
- Kavuşak
- Kayıköy
- Kazancı
- Keberli
- Kılavuztepe
- Koğuk
- Kopmaz
- Köprüköy
- Kopuzlu
- Korukçu
- Köseli
- Koyunlu
- Kumrulu
- Kurtuluş
- Kurudeğirmen
- Kurudere
- Merdan
- Meydanlık
- Mirzabey
- Obalı
- Ofköy
- Oğuzlar
- Pınarbaşı
- Şahintepe
- Sanayi
- Sarıköy
- Sarıtoprak
- Sazlı
- Seki
- Şentepe
- Serçeler
- Seyit Hasan
- Seyrantepe
- Sinanköy
- Tatlıçayır
- Tekel
- Tepe
- Tepecik
- Tilkilik
- Topraklı
- Türkmenhacı
- Üçtepe
- Uğrak
- Uğurlu
- Ulutürk
- Uyanık
- Yağmurköy
- Yamaçköy
- Yasince
- Yenice
- Yukarıdolay
- Yukarıharım
- Yukarısalat

== Çermik ==
Çermik

- Ağaçhan
- Akçörten
- Akkoyunlu
- Akpınar
- Alabuğday
- Alakoç
- Arabük
- Armağantaşı
- Armutlu
- Artuk
- Aşağışeyhler
- Aşağıtaşmalı
- Asmalık
- Aynalı
- Bademlik
- Bahçe
- Balıksırtı
- Başarı
- Bayat
- Bayırbağı
- Baykal
- Bayrak
- Bintaş
- Bircemal
- Bulundu
- Çalıtepe
- Ceylan
- Çukur
- Çukurelma
- Değirmenli
- Dikyol
- Dilekpınar
- Elifuşağı
- Eskibağ
- Genceli
- Göktepe
- Gözerek
- Güçlütaş
- Günaşan
- Gürüz
- Güzel
- Haburman
- İkiçeltik
- İncili
- Kalaç
- Kale
- Kalecik
- Karacaviran
- Karakaya
- Karamusa
- Karataş
- Kartaltaşı
- Kayagediği
- Keklik
- Kırmatepe
- Köksal
- Kömürcüler
- Konaklı
- Konuksever
- Korudağ
- Kuşlukçayırı
- Kuyuköy
- Örenkuyu
- Pamuklu
- Petekkaya
- Pınarlı
- Recep
- Saltepe
- Saray
- Sarıbalta
- Sarıca
- Şeyhandede
- Sinek
- Tepe
- Toplu
- Yabanardı
- Yayıklı
- Yaylacık
- Yeşilova
- Yiğitler
- Yoğun

== Çınar ==
Çınar

- Ağaçsever
- Akçomak
- Aktepe
- Alabaş
- Alancık
- Altınakar
- Arafat
- Aşağıkonak
- Aşağımollaali
- Avdalı
- Ayveri
- Bağacık
- Ballıbaba
- Başaklı
- Başalan
- Bayırkonağı
- Belenli
- Bellitaş
- Beneklitaş
- Beşpınar
- Bilmece
- Boğazören
- Bozçalı
- Bulutçeker
- Çakırkaya
- Çakırtutmaz
- Çataltarla
- Çatmadal
- Çeltikaltı
- Çınarköy
- Çömçeli
- Çukurbaşı
- Cumhuriyet
- Demirölçek
- Dikmencik
- Dişlibaşak
- Düğrük
- Düzova
- Ekinveren
- Eski
- Fatih
- Filizören
- Gazi
- Göktepe
- Görece
- Gümüştaş
- Gürses
- Halıören
- Halkapınar
- Harabe
- Hasköy
- Höyükdibi
- İnanöz
- İncirtepe
- Karababa
- Karabudak
- Karaçevre
- Karalar
- Karasungur
- Kazıktepe
- Kılıçkaya
- Kırkağaç
- Köksalan
- Kubacık
- Kürekli
- Kuruyazı
- Kutluk
- Kuyuluhöyük
- Leblebitaş
- Meydanköy
- Muratcık
- Öncülü
- Ortaşar
- Ovabağ
- Özyar
- Pembeviran
- Piremehmetağa
- Şekerören
- Selyazı
- Sevindik
- Şeyhçoban
- Sırımkesen
- Soğansuyu
- Solmaz
- Şükürlü
- Sürendal
- Taşhelvası
- Tekkaynak
- Tilver
- Toraman
- Uzgider
- Yaprakbaşı
- Yarımkaş
- Yazçiçeği
- Yeni
- Yeşil
- Yeşilbağ
- Yeşiltaş
- Yıllarca
- Yukarıortaören
- Yuvacık

== Çüngüş ==
Çüngüş

- Akbaşak
- Aktaş
- Albayrak
- Arpadere
- Atalar
- Avut
- Aydınlı
- Balcılar
- Camiikebir
- Camiisuk
- Çataldut
- Çaybaşı
- Değirmensuyu
- Deveboynu
- Elmadere
- Elyos
- Gökçepelit
- Güneydere
- Handere
- Hindibaba
- Hoya
- İbikkaya
- Karakaya
- Karşıyaka
- Kaynakköy
- Keleşevleri
- Koçören
- Norşin
- Ormançayı
- Oyuklu
- Polatuşağı
- Sağtepe
- Seferuşağı
- Türkmen
- Üçpınar
- Yaygınkonak
- Yazyağmuru
- Yenice
- Yeniköy
- Yukarışeyhler

== Dicle ==
Dicle

- 15 Temmuz
- Acar
- Altayköy
- Arıköy
- Bademli
- Bağlarbaşı
- Bahçedere
- Bahçeköy
- Baltacı
- Başköy
- Baturköy
- Biçer
- Boğaz
- Boğazköy
- Bozaba
- Çavlı
- Çelebi
- Dedeköy
- Değirmenli
- Döğer
- Durabeyli
- Gelincik
- Gölbaşı
- Gündoğdu
- Kaygısız
- Kayıköy
- Kelekçi
- Kırklar
- Kırkpınar
- Kocaalan
- Koruköy
- Kurşunlu
- Kurudere
- Meydanköy
- Pekmezciler
- Pınar
- Sergenli
- Süsümlü
- Taşağıl
- Tepe
- Tepebaşı
- Uğrak
- Ulubaş
- Uluçeşme
- Üzümlü
- Yeşilsırt
- Yeşiltepe
- Yokuşlu

== Eğil ==
Eğil

- Akalan
- Aşağıdöşemeler
- Babalar
- Bahşılar
- Balaban
- Balım
- Baysu
- Dere
- Düzlük
- Gündoğuran
- Gürünlü
- Ilgın
- Kale
- Kalecik
- Kalkan
- Kayaköyü
- Kazanlı
- Kırkkuyu
- Konak
- Meşeler
- Oyalı
- Sağlam
- Sarıca
- Sarmaşık
- Selman
- Taşdam
- Tepecik
- Yatır
- Yenişehir
- Yukarıhaydan

== Ergani ==
Ergani

- Adnan Menderes
- Ahmetli
- Akçakale
- Akçoban
- Alitaşı
- Armutova
- Aşağıbitikçi
- Aşağıkuyulu
- Azıklı
- Aziziye
- Bademli
- Bagür
- Bahçekaşı
- Bereketli
- Boğazköy
- Boncuklu
- Bozyer
- Caferan
- Çakartaş
- Çakırfakır
- Canveren
- Çayırdere
- Çayköy
- Çimlihöyük
- Cömert
- Coşkun
- Çukurdere
- Dağarası
- Dallıdağ
- Değirmendere
- Demirli
- Dereboyu
- Deringöze
- Develi
- Devletkuşu
- Dibektaş
- Doğanköy
- Fatih
- Fevzi Çakmak
- Giraylar
- Gökiçi
- Gözekaya
- Gözlü
- Gülerce
- Güneştepe
- Güzelyurt
- Hançerli
- Hendekköy
- Hilar
- İncehıdır
- İstasyon
- Karaburçak
- Karpuzlu
- Karşıbağlar
- Kavaklı
- Kavurmaküpü
- Kayan
- Kemaliye
- Kemertaş
- Kesentaş
- Kıralan
- Kocaali
- Kömürtaş
- Kortaş
- Koyunalan
- Kumçi
- Morkoyun
- Namıkkemal
- Olgun
- Ortaağaç
- Ortayazı
- Otluca
- Özbilek
- Pınarkaya
- Sabırlı
- Salihli
- Sallar
- Sallıca
- Sanayi
- Saray
- Savaş
- Selmanköy
- Şirinevler
- Sökündüzü
- Şölen
- Tevekli
- Üçkardeş
- Usluca
- Üzümlü
- Yakacık
- Yamaçlar
- Yapraklı
- Yayvantepe
- Yeniköy
- Yeşilköy
- Yolbulan
- Yolköprü
- Yoncalı
- Yukarıbitikçi
- Yukarıkarpuzlu
- Yukarıkuyulu
- Ziyaret

== Hani ==
Hani

- Abacılar
- Akçayurt
- Anıl
- Belen
- Çardaklı
- Çarşı
- Çukurköy
- Dereli
- Gömeç
- Gürbüz
- Kalaba
- Kaledibi
- Kırım
- Kuyular
- Merkez
- Okurköy
- Serenköy
- Sergen
- Soylu
- Süslü
- Topçular
- Uzunlar
- Veziri
- Yayvan
- Yukarıturalı
- Zirve

== Hazro ==
Hazro

- Ağartı
- Bağyurdu
- Bahçe
- Bayırdüzü
- Cami
- Çitlibahçe
- Çökeksu
- Dadaş
- Elhuvan
- Gedikalan
- Gözlü
- Hürriyet
- İncekavak
- İşkar
- Kavaklıboğaz
- Kırkkaşık
- Kırmataş
- Koçbaba
- Kulaçtepe
- Meşebağları
- Mutluca
- Ormankaya
- Reşik
- Sarıçanak
- Sarıerik
- Terdöken
- Topalan
- Ülgen
- Uzunargıt
- Varınca
- Yazgı

== Kayapınar ==
Kayapınar

- Avcısuyu
- Barış
- Baykara
- Beneklitaş
- Cankatran
- Çölgüzeli
- Cücük
- Cumhuriyet
- Diclekent
- Esentepe
- Fırat
- Gözalan
- Gözegöl
- Güleçoba
- Harmanardı
- Hatipoğlu
- Huzurevleri
- Kaldırım
- Karayakup
- Keklik
- Kırkpınar
- Medya
- Mezopotamya
- Petek
- Peyas
- Sağkulak
- Sultantepe
- Taban
- Talaytepe
- Tişo
- Tosunlu
- Uyandık
- Yeniözerli
- Yolboyu Pirinçlık

== Kocaköy ==
Kocaköy

- Anbar
- Arkbaşı
- Boyunlu
- Bozbağlar
- Bozyar
- Çakmaklı
- Çayırlı
- Çaytepe
- Eyüpler
- Gökçen
- Gözebaşı
- Günalan
- Hacıreşit
- Kaya
- Kokulupınar
- Şaklat
- Şerifoğulları
- Şeyhşerafettin
- Suçıktı
- Tepecik
- Yazıköy
- Yenişehir

== Kulp ==
Kulp

- Ağaçkorur
- Ağaçlı
- Ağıllı
- Akbulak
- Akçasır
- Akdoruk
- Alaca
- Argunköy
- Aşağıelmalı
- Aygün
- Ayhanköy
- Bağcılar
- Baloğlu
- Barın
- Başbuğ
- Bayırköy
- Çağlayan
- Çukurca
- Demirli
- Dolun
- Düzce
- Güleç
- Güllük
- Hamzalı
- İnkaya
- İslamköy
- Kamışlı
- Karaağaç
- Karabulak
- Karaorman
- Karpuzlu
- Kayacık
- Kayahan
- Kaynak
- Koçkar
- Konuklu
- Kurudere
- Merkez Eski
- Merkez Yeni
- Narlıca
- Özbek
- Salkımlı
- Saltukköy
- Taşköprü
- Temren
- Tepecik
- Turgut Özal
- Tuzlaköy
- Üçkuyu
- Ünal
- Uygur
- Uzunova
- Yakıtköy
- Yayıkköy
- Yaylak
- Yeşilköy
- Yuvacık
- Zeyrek

== Lice ==
Lice

- Abalı
- Akçabudak
- Arıklı
- Bağlan
- Baharlar
- Bayırlı
- Birlik
- Budak
- Çağdaş
- Cami Kebir
- Çarşı
- Çavundur
- Çeper
- Çıralı
- Dallıca
- Damar
- Daralan
- Delvan
- Dernek
- Dibekköy
- Dolunay
- Duruköy
- Ecemiş
- Erginköy
- Esenler
- Gökçe
- Güçlü
- Güldiken
- Gürbeyli
- Hedik
- Kabakaya
- Kalı
- Karahasan
- Kelvan
- Kılıçlı
- Kıpçak
- Kıralan
- Kıyıköy
- Körtük
- Kumluca
- Kutlu
- Mulla
- Müminağa
- Muradiye
- Ortaç
- Örtülü
- Oyuklu
- Şaar
- Savat
- Saydamlı
- Şenlik
- Serince
- Sığınak
- Tepe
- Türeli
- Tuzlaköy
- Uçarlı
- Üçdamlar
- Ulucak
- Yalaza
- Yalımlı
- Yamaçlı
- Yaprakköy
- Yenişehir
- Yeşilburç
- Yolçatı
- Yorulmaz
- Yünlüce
- Ziyaret
- Zümrüt

== Silvan ==
Silvan

- Akçayır
- Akçeltik
- Akdere
- Akyol
- Alibey
- Altınkum
- Arıköy
- Aşağıkaya
- Aşağıveysi
- Babakaya
- Bağdere
- Bağlar
- Bahçe
- Bahçelievler
- Başdeğirmen
- Başıbüyük
- Bayrambaşı
- Bellibahçe
- Bereketli
- Beypınar
- Boyunlu
- Çakıltaşı
- Çaldere
- Cami
- Çardak
- Çevriksu
- Çiftliçevre
- Çiğdemli
- Çiğil
- Çobantepe
- Dağcılar
- Darköprü
- Demirkuyu
- Dolapdere
- Doluçanak
- Duru
- Düzalan
- Erikyazı
- Eskiköy
- Eskiocak
- Eşme
- Feridun
- Gökçetevek
- Görentepe
- Görmez
- Güçlü
- Gündüz
- Gürpınar
- Güzderesi
- Heybelikonak
- İncesu
- Kale
- Karacalar
- Karahacı
- Karamus
- Kasımlı
- Kayadere
- Kazandağı
- Keklikdere
- Kıraçtepe
- Kızlal
- Konak
- Kumgölü
- Kumluk
- Kutlualan
- Malabadi
- Mescit
- Nohuttepe
- Onbaşılar
- Ormandışı
- Otluk
- Sağlık
- Şanlı
- Sarıbuğday
- Selahattin
- Sulak
- Sulubağ
- Susuz
- Taşpınar
- Tekel
- Tokluca
- Üçbasamak
- Umurköy
- Yenidoğan
- Yeniköy
- Yenişehir
- Yeşerdi
- Yeşilbahçe
- Yeşilköy
- Yolaç
- Yolarası
- Yukarıveysi
- Yüksek
- Yuva

== Sur ==
Sur

- Abdaldede
- Ağaçlıdere
- Alabal
- Alcık
- Alibardak
- Alipaşa
- Arpaderesi
- Bağıvar
- Bağpınar
- Bahçecik
- Baroğlu
- Beybulak
- Bostanpınar
- Bozdemir
- Büyükakören
- Büyükkadı
- Cami Kebir
- Cami Nebi
- Çarıklı
- Çataksu
- Çelikli
- Cemal Yılmaz
- Cevatpaşa
- Çubuklu
- Dabanoğlu
- Dervişhasan
- Doğanlı
- Doğuçanakçı
- Dumrul
- Erimli
- Eryolu
- Esenbağ
- Fatihpaşa
- Fetih
- Fidanlar
- Gencan
- Gölpınar
- Gültepe
- Hacıosmanköy
- Harmanlar
- Hasırlı
- Havacılar
- Hızırilyas
- İskenderpaşa
- Kabasakal
- Kapaklıpınar
- Karabaş
- Karaçalı
- Karacaören
- Karaçimen
- Kardeşler
- Karpuzlu
- Karpuztepe
- Kartaltepe
- Kavaklıbağ
- Kayayolu
- Kengerli
- Kervanpınar
- Kırmasırt
- Konacık
- Köprübaşı
- Köşk
- Koyungüden
- Kozan
- Küçükakören
- Küçükkadı
- Kumluçat
- Kumrucak
- Kuşburnu
- Kuşlukbağı
- Lalebey
- Melikahmet
- Mermer
- Mermeri
- Nefirtaş
- Özekli
- Pınardüzü
- Sağdıçlı
- Sapanca
- Sarıkamış
- Sarılar
- Sarıyazma
- Sati
- Savaş
- Sayarlar
- Soğanlı
- Süleyman Nazif
- Süngüler
- Tanoğlu
- Tezgeçer
- Yarımca
- Yenice
- Yenidoğan
- Yenievler
- Yeşilköy
- Yeşilli
- Yiğitçavuş
- Yukarıkılıçtaşı
- Ziya Gökalp
- Ziyaret

== Yenişehir ==
Yenişehir

- Al
- Alangör
- Alpu
- Aziziye
- Bahçelievler
- Başil
- Bozek
- Çakmak
- Çelikevler
- Çimenler
- Cumhuriyet
- Dicle
- Dikentepe
- Dökmetaş
- Dokuzçeltik
- Dönümlü
- Ekinciler
- Elidolu
- Eser
- Fabrika
- Feritköşkü
- Geyiktepe
- Gürdoğan
- Güvendere
- Güvercinlik
- Güzelköy
- Hantepe
- İlbaş
- Kesikağaç
- Kooperatifler
- Sanayi
- Sancar
- Sarıyatak
- Şehitlik
- Sivritepe
- Tanışık
- Üçkuyu
- Yaytaş
- Yenişehir
- Yolaltı
- Yukarınasırlar
- Yüksek
