= Wildfires in Turkey =

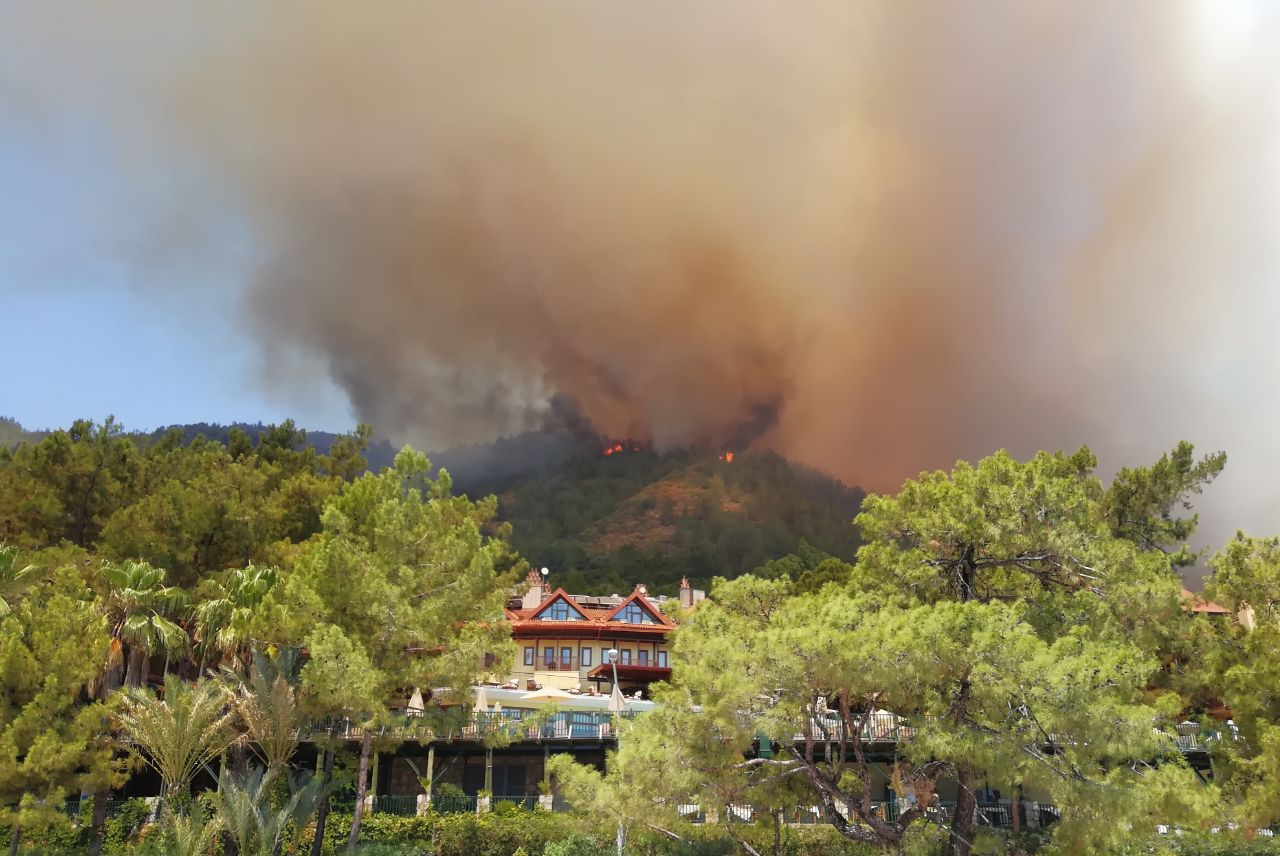
Fire Demon looking over the ridge in Marmaris in 2021

Wildfires in Turkey occur mainly in the Mediterranean and Aegean Regions due to their hot, dry summer between late-June and September.

Over thousands of years people have modified fire regimes by agriculture and forestry, such as by grazing animals and cutting down trees.

Nine out of ten wildfires are due to humans; the most common cause being carelessness, such as stubble burning, litter, hunting and cigarette butts. Nowadays urbanization and climate change are affecting wildfires, with the season extending to May to September. The 2021 wildfires were the largest since the creation of the republic.

More prevention effort has been called for: such as subsidizing farmers to mulch rather than burn stubble, and better thinning and cleaning of forests near buildings.

== Locations ==
Most wildfire is in the Mediterranean region west of 38 degrees. Between 2014 and 2024 Antalya and Muğla Provinces lost the largest area of forest. The wildland–urban interface is mostly in tourist areas near the sea and forest villages inland.

== Causes ==
Although the causes of about half the fires are unknown experts think that most fires are caused by human influence. Summers in the main wildfire regions have become hotter and drier due to climate change in Turkey.

Some say that too much forest land has been used (allocated for 49 to 99 years) for mines, hotels and infrastructure thus increasing human influence, for example because of new roads. From 2015 to 2024 over 20% of the area burnt was due to electricity distribution faults, and some have claimed the distribution companies are not regulated to do enough maintenance.

Some fires are caused by people burning stubble, which is illegal and it has been suggested that farmers be encouraged to do direct seeding.

== Effects ==
Both Sentinel-2 and differenced Normalized Burn Ratio (another satellite measurement) are good for analysing burnt area and severity. Wildfires can cause air pollution with PM 2.5.

== Policy and prevention ==
Spending more on fuel load management has been suggested. Mediterranean Experts on Climate and environmental Change say that both social and technical innovation can help - technically through more remote sensing. Subsidizing farmers to use stubble as mulch has been suggested.

Although Turkish pines (Note: Pinus brutia - is Turkish "Kızılçam" literally "red pine" – so sometimes mistranslated) are fire resistant their cones can be thrown long distances and thus worsen treetop fires, which are the most dangerous. Therefore better thinning and cleaning of forest near buildings has been suggested.

== Firefighting ==
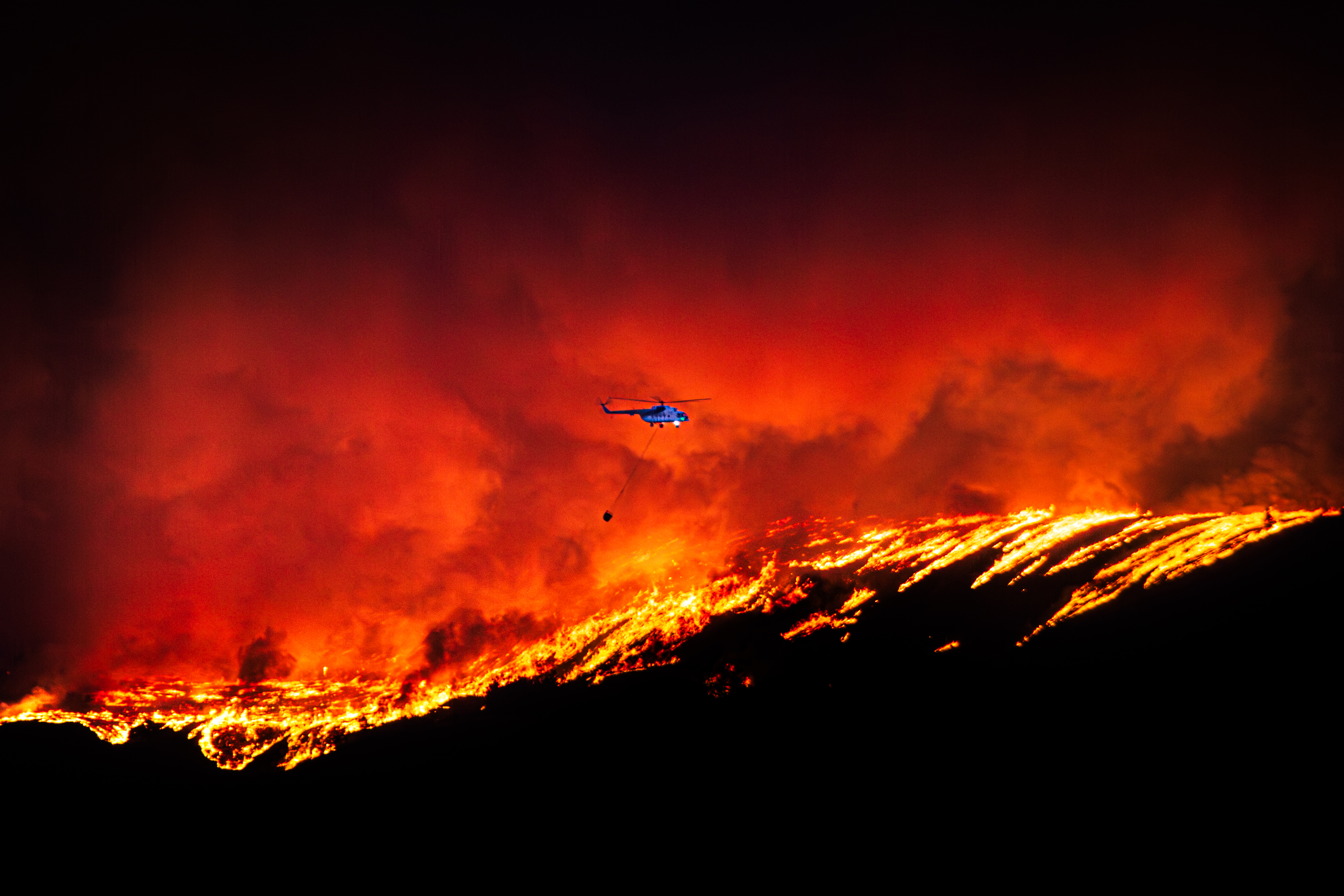
A devastating wildfire in Çanakkale, which raged for three days in 2023 before it was brought under control

Electricity transmission is sometimes turned off. In 2025 experts said that there was enough air equipment but not enough ground forces.

== Regeneration ==
Maquis can quickly regrow but is not legally protected.

== History ==
Forest fires in Turkey by year(2.1.1 Forest fires, 1988-2024)

=== 2020 ===
A forest fire started at Sarımazı neighborhood of Belen district in Hatay Province, southern Turkey, on 9 October. Within two days, the fire burnt 400 ha (990 acres) of forest. The fire spread over to İskenderun and Arsuz districts, affecting many residences, factories, and nearly 100 people.

Government broadcaster TRT World said that the terrorist group PKK used wildfires as a strategy in the 1990s and that "Children of Fire Initiative, a PKK affiliate group, claimed responsibility for the fires in a statement published on Nuce Civan, an online pro-PKK publication."

As of 2025 the cause of most of the 21,000 ha burnt in 2020 is unknown: official statistics show about 200 ha of the rest was lightning, 700 ha intentional, and 8000 ha negligence or accidental.

=== 2021 ===
2021 Turkish wildfires
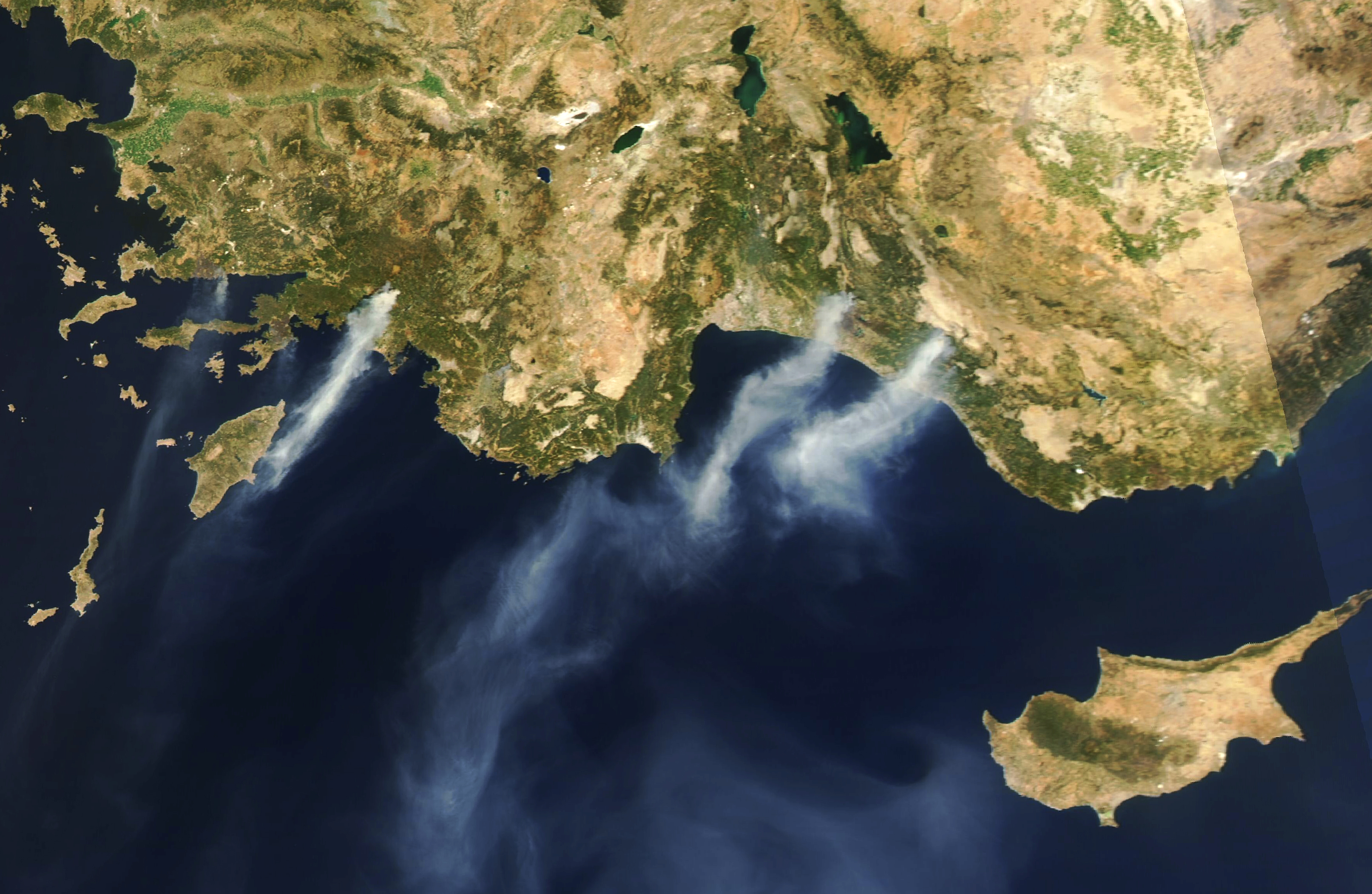
- Smoke from Antalya, Mersin and Muğla Provinces on 3 August
- Date: 28 July – 12 August 2021
- Location: Mediterranean and Aegean regions

Statistics
- Total area: 170,000 hectares

Impacts
- Deaths: 9
- Injuries: 800+

In July and August 2021, more than a hundred wildfires burnt nearly 1,600 square kilometres of forest in the worst-ever wildfire season in the history of the republic. The wildfires started in Manavgat, Antalya Province, on 28 July 2021, with the temperature around 37 °C (99 °F). The Manavgat wildfire was the largest for over a century. The fires were part of a larger series of wildfires, including those in neighbouring Greece, originating from a heatwave made more likely by climate change.

==== Background ====
The fires were some of several extreme weather events around the world in 2021.

May 2021 was the hottest May for over 50 years and followed a drought, made more likely by climate change. This was followed by near to above average June temperatures with positive temperature anomalies below 1 °C (1.8 °F) and ample rainfall, however, this did not impede the fires in Kaş, Tarsus and Marmaris on 26 and 27 June. Much stronger heat followed in the second half of July, as some regions reached positive temperature anomalies of up to 12 °C (22 °F), and a temperature reading of 36 °C (97 °F) was recorded as far north as Istanbul, where seasonal daytime temperatures would have been around 27 °C (81 °F).

==== The fires ====
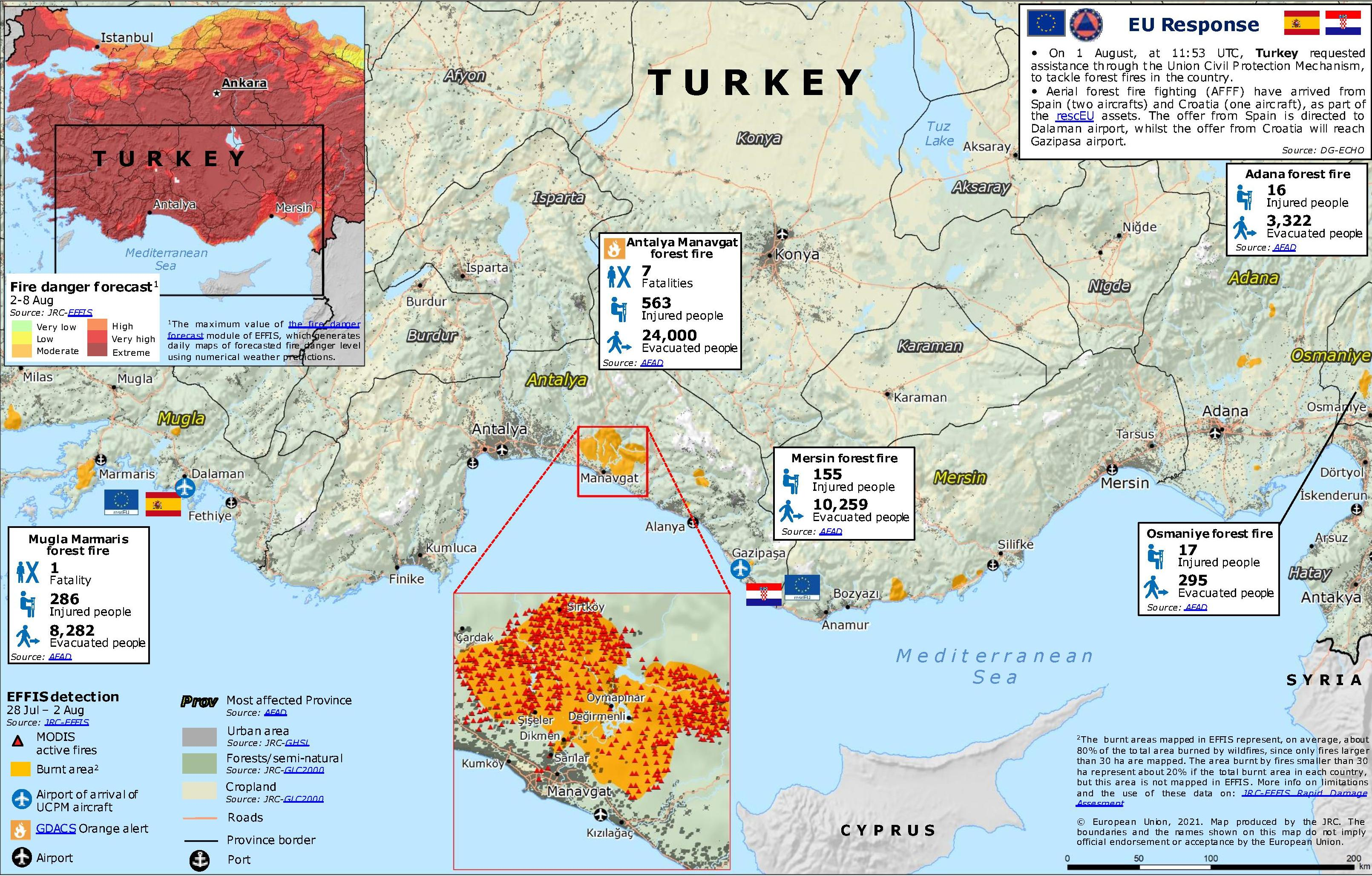
Map of the fires

Copernicus satellites measured the maximum daily heat intensity at about 20 gigawatts, four times the previous record in Turkey, and European Forest Fire Information System estimates placed the total area burnt at almost ten times the average for early August. Nine people died in the wildfires, at least two of them firefighters. Three deadly casualties were reported from the fire in Manavgat. 18 villages in Antalya and 16 villages in Adana and Mersin were evacuated. Most injuries were due to smoke inhalation. More than 4,000 tourists and staff in 2 hotels in Bodrum were evacuated by sea, by the Turkish Coastguard helped by private boats. Minister of Environment and Urban Planning Murat Kurum said that over 100 art museums would have to be demolished. The president declared parts of 5 southern provinces disaster zones.

The Kemerköy power plant in Muğla Province was evacuated on 4 August as a fire entered the plant. The same day some other people near Milas were evacuated by sea. Nearby Yeniköy power plant was also threatened by a fire. Rare summer rain in Antalya on 7 August helped bring the fires there under control, but those in Muğla remained serious, with 13 fires continuing in 5 provinces.

On 14 August, a Russian Navy Beriev Be-200 fire-fighting plane, one of two hired since July to help those affected by the fires in Kahramanmaraş, crashed just before it was due to land. There were five Russian servicemen and three Turkish citizens on board, all of whom perished in the accident.

Agriculture and Forestry Minister Bekir Pakdemirli said in July that three planes, 38 helicopters and about 4,000 firefighters had fought the fires. Drones were also used, along with 485 water tenders and 660 bulldozers. He also stated that more than 2,000 farm animals had died. The Disaster and Emergency Management Authority (AFAD) said on 29 July that 58 people were still in hospital. Ten people trapped at Oymapinar Dam were rescued. However, firefighting planes could only operate in daylight, and fallen trees blocked access to certain roads.

==== Effects ====
Air quality was affected. Most of the burnt forest was Turkish pine, which can generally regrow naturally.

==== Reactions ====
===== Domestic =====
On 3 August the Radio and Television Supreme Council warned media in Turkey not to be too negative in their coverage. Government loan repayments were postponed for the injured, and damage payments were made and interest-free credit promised to small businesses. Public access to various forests was banned until autumn. Opposition Republican People's Party (CHP) Chairman Kemal Kılıçdaroğlu argued that an adequate supply of planes is essential as most fires broke out on the steep foothills of the Taurus Mountains where planes would have been more efficient at keeping the fires under control, and criticised the government by claiming that it limited the ability of the Turkish Aeronautical Association to bid. Later on, he said that the president had been ignoring the climate crisis and drought in Turkey. The mayors of the eleven CHP governed metropolitans made a joint statement offering to finance the costs of firefighting planes. Other opposition parties also criticised the ministry: Selahattin Demirtaş of the Peoples' Democratic Party called the government incompetent, and Good Party leader Meral Akşener said she had warned the ministry about the lack of planes the previous year. Pakdemirli said the ministry would buy firefighting planes before the end of 2021. The Turkish Aeronautical Association said that the 5000 liter capacity limit for tenders for firefighting aircraft should have been lower so they could have bid, but the president said they should have updated their technology. The president said that municipalities are also responsible for firefighting, but mayors said they had not been invited to crisis coordination meetings.

In August, President Erdoğan, while busing through disaster areas, threw tea bags at citizens, which was criticized by several opposition politicians, including Ali Babacan who said the act was shameful.

==== International assistance ====
The following countries responded:

- Azerbaijan – 750 firefighters, 93 trucks, helicopter and plane
- Kuwait – 45 firefighters and 6 trucks
- Croatia – airplanes
- France – airplanes
- Greece – offer refused by Turkey
- Israel – airplanes
- Iran – airplanes
- Kazakhstan – In August 2021, the Astana Times reported that helicopters from Kazakhstan helped extinguish forest fires in southwest Turkey.
- Spain – airplanes
- Romania – airplanes
- Russia – airplanes
- Belarus – airplanes
- Poland – S-70i helicopter
- Ukraine – airplanes
- USA – 2 water dropping CH-47 Chinook helicopters

International Organizations:

- European Union – 3 Canadairs from the rescEU fleet

===== Seedling donation movement =====
Inspired by South Korean volleyball player Kim Yeon-koung after the Turkish team played them, South Koreans donated seedlings to the NGO Environmental Organizations Solidarity Association, who planted "Turkey-Korea Friendship Forests".

=== Causes ===
As of 2025 of the nearly 140,000 ha burnt in 2021 the cause of a third is unknown, a third intentional, and a third negligence or accidental.

=== 2022 ===
On 24 June, a wildfire raged in the Bördübet region, near Marmaris on the Aegean Sea coast. On 13 July, a wildfire broke out on the Datça Peninsula. 450 houses and 3,530 people were evacuated from the area.

=== 2024 ===
Wildfires in Turkey
- Date: June 2024
- Location: Southeastern Turkey

Statistics
- Total fires: 74
- Burned area: 31,900+

Impacts
- Deaths: 12+
- Injuries: 78+, 5 critically
- Livestock lost: "Hundreds killed"

A series of wildfires broke out in Turkey throughout 2024 and spread as a result of strong winds and dry conditions. As of 24 June 2024, the most impacted region was in Diyarbakır province, where a mid-June fire killed at least 12 people and caused at least 78 injuries.

==== June ====
In mid-June 2024, a severe wildfire grew across Southeastern Turkey, affecting mainly Kurdish-majority regions and killing at least 12 people. The fire started from burning of crop stubble in rural Koksalan late in the evening, and spread into five villages, including Yazcicegi and Bagacik in the Çınar, Diyarbakır municipality due to strong winds. At least 78 people suffered from fire-related injuries and smoke inhalation, with five people requiring intensive care. In addition, hundreds of livestock were killed.

The Peoples' Equality and Democracy Party criticized the government's fire response due to it only using ground forces when they claimed that water bombers were necessary to stop the conflagration before widespread damage occurred.

=== 2025 ===
Map of 2025 İzmir wildfires (map data)

From June wildfires broke out in İzmir Province in the west. These were ignited due to record breaking temperatures and strong winds. Following the wildfires more than 50,000 residents were evacuated from nearby areas like Seferihisar, Menderes, Kuyucak, and Doğanbey, Beyşehir.

==== Causes ====
High temperatures were followed by strong winds of 40–50 km/h (25–30 mph). These winds pushed the fires through forested and residential areas. Initial investigations showed a combination of potential human and electrical causes, including suspected power line malfunctions and one arrest linked to intentional ignition.

==== Affected areas ====
The wildfires burned several districts in Turkey including Seferihisar, Menderes, Kuyucak, and Doganbey. Due to the fires İzmir Adnan Menderes Airport suffered damage and was temporarily closed because of the heavy smoke. Residential areas, agricultural land, and forested were all impacted by the fire, with entire villages evacuated.

==== Regional impact ====
The wildfires led to the evacuation of more than 50,000 people, with more than 42,000 evacuees coming from Seferihisar alone.Large scale property damage was reported that includes destruction of several villages, rural houses, farms and businesses. No fatalities were reported, but dozens of people suffered from smoke inhalation.

On 29 June, amid high temperatures and strong winds of up to 117 km/h (73 mph), a series of wildfires broke out across the country, mostly in İzmir Province. They forced the evacuation of over 50,000 people from 41 settlements around the province and operations at İzmir Adnan Menderes Airport were temporarily suspended. Three people were killed by wildfires near Ödemiş: an 81-year-old bedridden man and two people who were working with firefighters to tackle the fire. The fires in İzmir were brought under control on 4 July, having destroyed around 5,000 ha (12,000 acres) and some 200 houses.

On 4 July, a fire broke out in a forest in Dörtyol and spread quickly due to strong winds. By the next day almost 2,000 people had been evacuated in Hatay Province whilst over 1,000 emergency personnel worked to fight the blaze.

On 23 July, five firefighters and five members of the AKUT Search and Rescue Association were killed and 14 others were hospitalized while battling a wildfire in Seyitgazi, Eskişehir Province. Authorities said the wind suddenly changed direction, causing the flames to shift rapidly and surround the victims.

On 25 July, wildfires broke out in Adana, Antalya, Manavgat and Mersin. That same day, the provinces of Bilecik and Izmir were designated as disaster areas by the interior ministry due to wildfires.

On 27 July, wildfires forced the closure of the Bursa-Ankara highway. The next day, a water tanker overturned in Bursa, killing three firefighters from Bolu Province who were responding to a wildfire in Ağlaşan. On July 28 it was reported that the fires displaced 3,500 people.

On 11 August, a firetruck responding to a wildfire in Hasanbeyli, Osmaniye Province, fell into a ditch, killing a forestry worker.

On 16 August, a wildfire broke out in Gelibolu District, Çanakkale Province, forcing the evacuation of five villages and the closure of parts of the Gallipoli Peninsula Historical Site.

On 29 August, a Ministry of Agriculture and Forestery Air Tractor AT-802 firefighting plane crashed on a field in Hacıbayramlar, Yatağan, Muğla, during an emergency landing due to a malfunction, injuring the pilot.

== Gallery ==
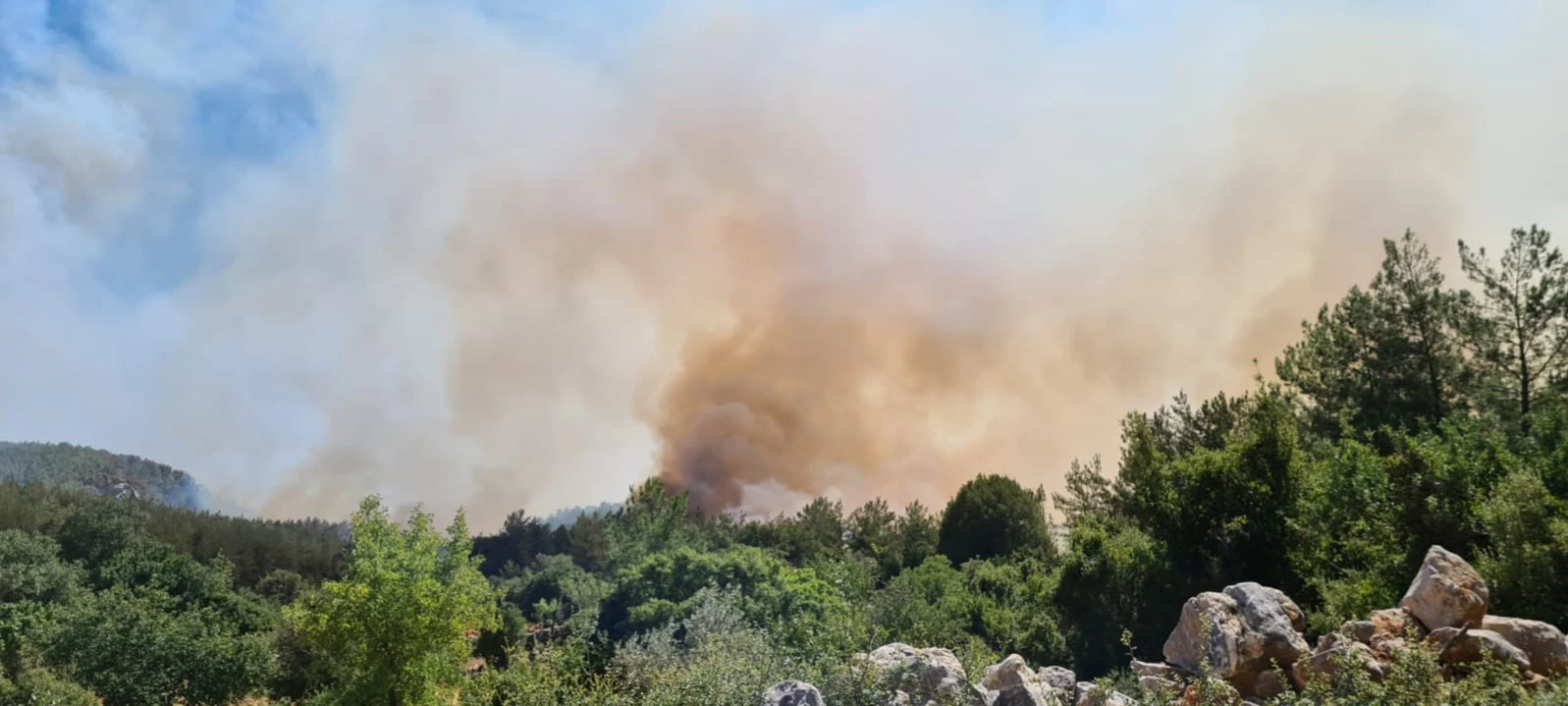
Wildfires in Milas

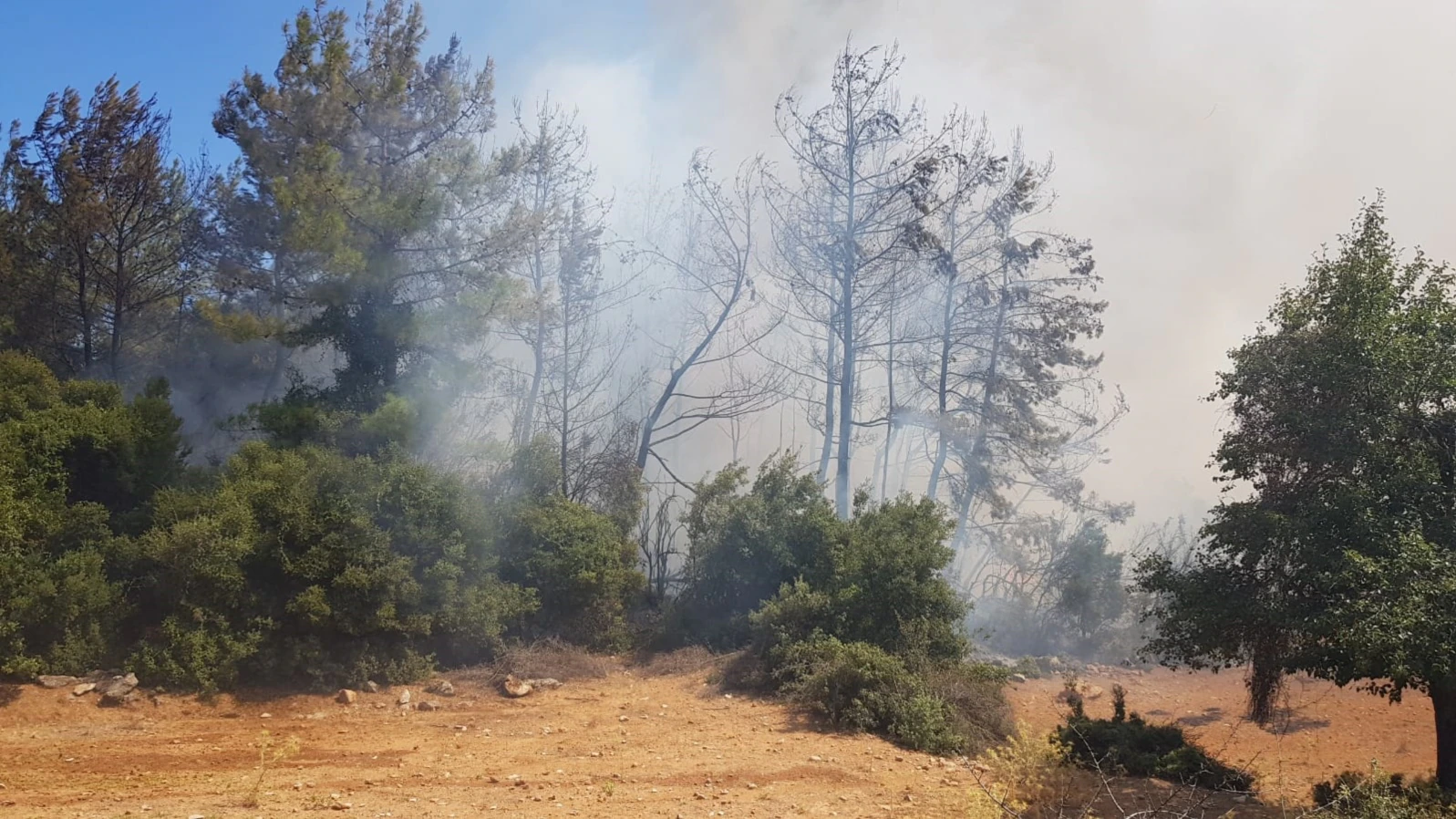
Smoke in Milas

Wildfires in İçmeler, Bodrum.

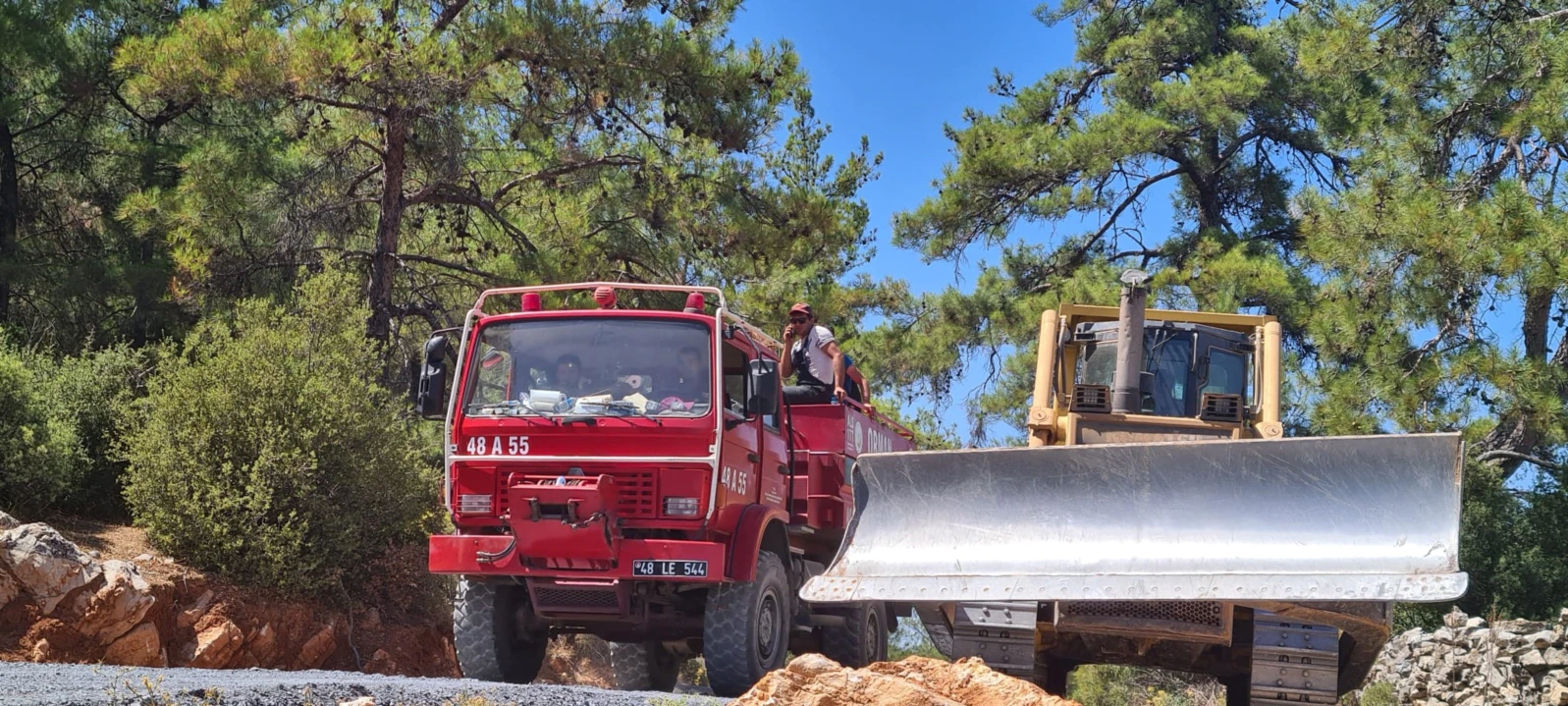
Firefighters in Milas

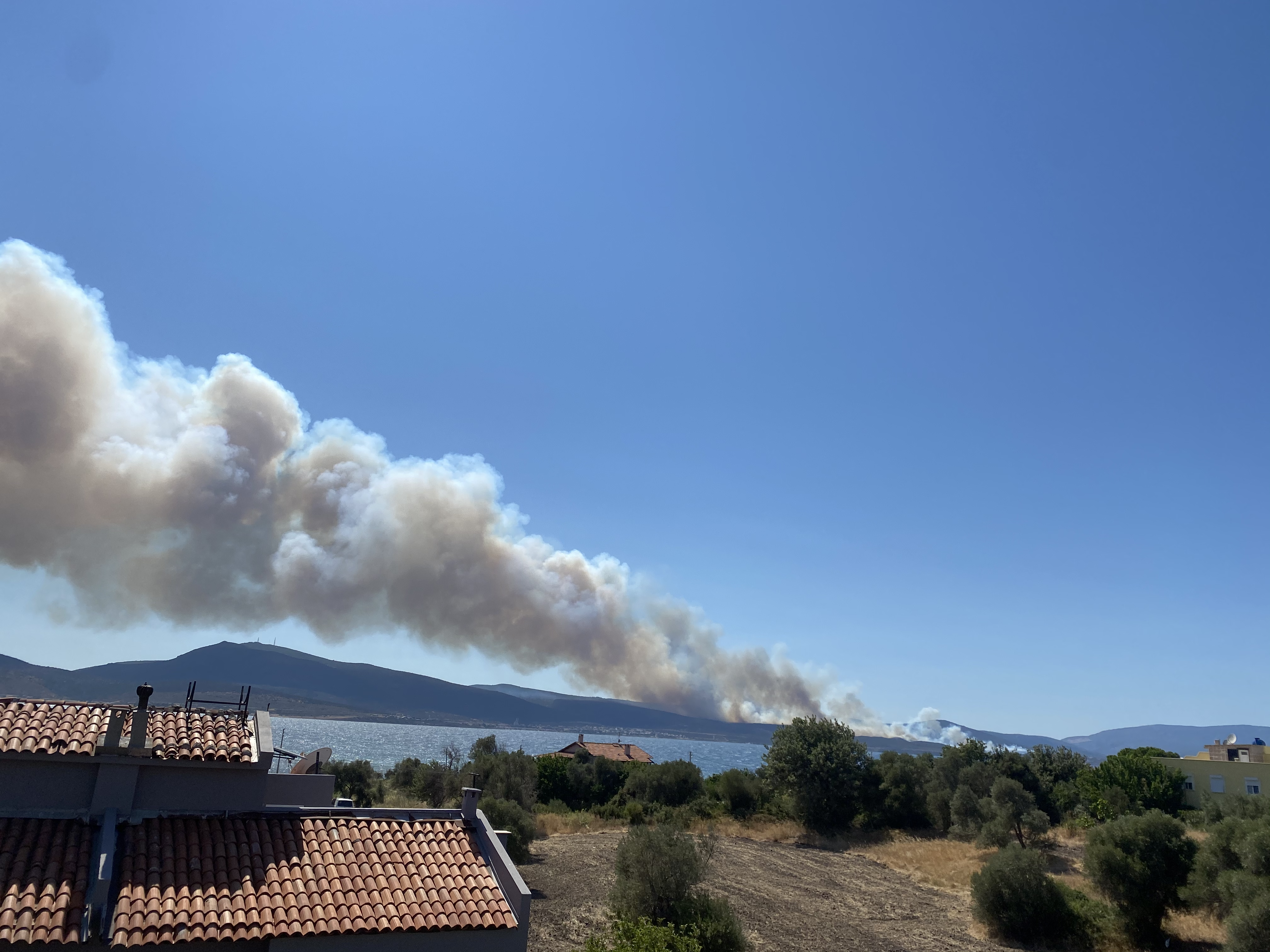
Wildfires in Urla, İzmir

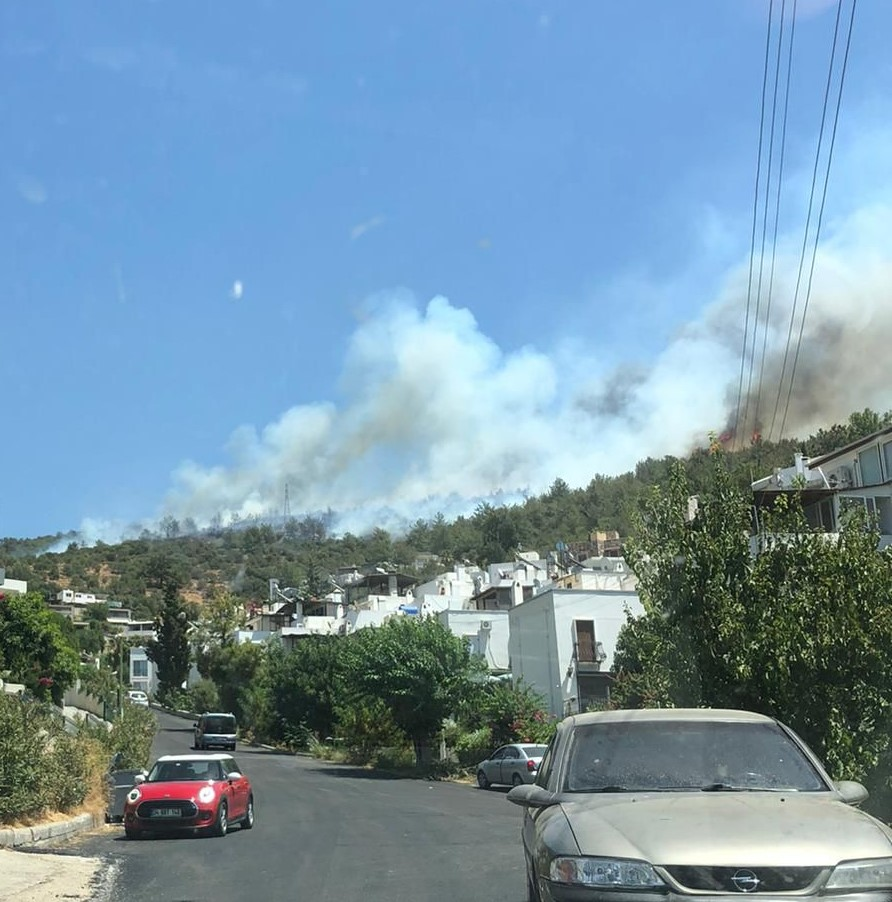
Kumbahçe, Bodrum 31 July 2021

== See also ==
- 2009 Mediterranean wildfires
