= Meydanköy =

Meydanköy can refer to:

- Meydanköy, Çerkeş
- Meydanköy, Çınar
- Meydanköy, Dicle
- Meydanköy, Hınıs
