= Qarababa =

Qarababa or Karababa may refer to:

- Qarababa, Nakhchivan, Azerbaijan
- Qarababa, Zangilan, Azerbaijan
- Karababa, Çınar, Turkey
- Karababa, Araban, Turkey
