= Çınarköy =

Çınarköy can refer to the following villages in Turkey:

- Çınarköy, Çınar
- Çınarköy, Çüngüş
- Çınarköy, Dursunbey
- Çınarköy, Ezine
- Çınarköy, Kuşadası
- Çınarköy, Yenice
