= Düzova =

Düzova can refer to:

- Düzova, Çınar
- the Turkish name for Exometochi
