= Gürses =

Gürses may refer to:

== People ==
- Müslüm Gürses, Turkish folk singer
- Sabri Gürses, Turkish writer
- Uğur Gürses, Turkish financial columnist

== Places ==
- Gürses, Çınar, a village in Diyarbakır Province, Turkey
- Gürses, Demre, a village in Antalya Province, Turkey
