= Solmaz =

Solmaz (Turkish: colorfast) can refer to:

- Solmaz (name), list of people with the name
- Solmaz, Çınar, district in Diyarbakır, Turkey
- Solmaz, Tavas, village in Denizli, Turkey
