= January 2016 Diyarbakır bombing =

2016 Diyarbakir bombing
- Part of Kurdish–Turkish conflict (1978–present)
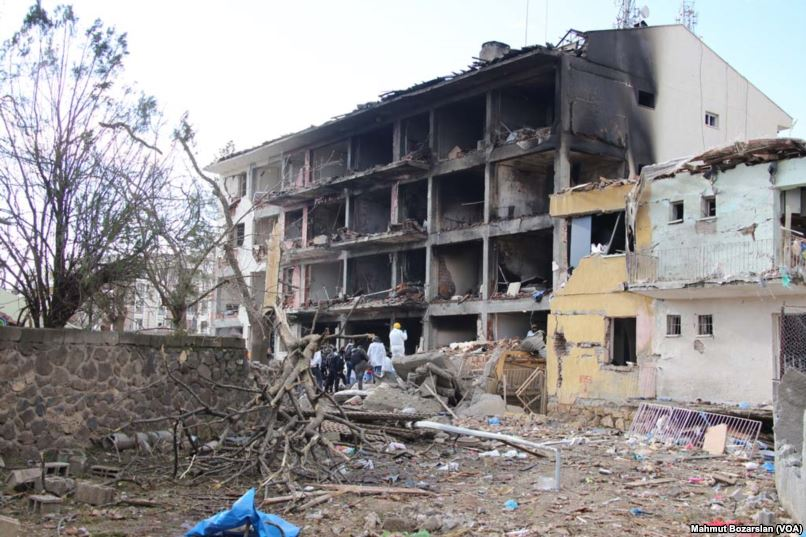
- Çınar District Police Department building after the bomb attack
- Location: Çınar, Diyarbakır, Turkey
- Date: January 13, 2016; 23:30
- Attack type: Bombing
- Weapons: Car Bomb; Long gun; Rocket Launcher
- Deaths: 6–8
- Injuries: 39
- Perpetrator: Kurdistan Workers' Party (allegedly)

The January 2016 Diyarbakır attack was an assault on a police building in Çınar, Diyarbakır, Turkey, on 13 January. The PKK carried out the attack using bombs, rocket launchers, and firearms, killing at least six people, including a woman and a child, and injuring 39. Security forces later killed eight PKK members in clashes.

Among those who lost their lives after the attack was 4-year-old Mevlüde İrem Çiftçi, along with 5-year-old Sadık Efe Açıkgöz and his 1-year-old sister, Ecrin Açıkgöz. While the bodies of the two siblings were pulled from the rubble, Ecrin Açıkgöz later died from her injuries at Dicle University Faculty of Medicine Hospital.

== Background ==
After the June 2015 Turkish general election, the PKK began damaging public property, blocking roads, and attacking construction sites. Following the Suruç bombing by ISIS, the PKK attacked a military unit in Adıyaman and two police officers in Şanlıurfa on July 22. The 2013 “resolution process” effectively ended. In response, the Turkish government launched an air operation in Northern Iraq, bombing PKK camps and ISIS targets. A total of 590 people were detained in operations against the PKK, ISIS, and DHKP-C in Turkey.

== Attack ==
PKK members detonated a car bomb in front of the Çınar District Police Department, which also housed police residences. They then opened fire with long-barreled weapons and rocket launchers, heavily damaging the building. Two police relatives, including a woman and a baby, died in the wreckage, with the baby reportedly burned to death. A nearby two-story house collapsed due to the explosion, killing Lokman Açıkgöz and his children, Sadık Efe and Ecrin Açıkgöz. In total, 14 police officers and 20 civilians were injured. A 40-minute clash followed, resulting in the deaths of eight PKK members. Emergency teams, including police, firefighters, and AFAD, responded, and the injured were taken to local hospitals.
