= Bozçalı =

Bozçalı can refer to:

- Bozçalı, Bismil
- Bozçalı, Çınar
- Bozçalı, İliç
