= Toraman =

Toraman is a Turkish surname. Notable people with the surname include:

- Emre Toraman (born 1979), Turkish footballer
- İbrahim Toraman (born 1981), Turkish footballer

== See also ==
- Toraman, Çınar
- Toraman, Hınıs
