= Kılıçkaya (disambiguation) =

Kılıçkaya can refer to:

- Kılıçkaya
- Kılıçkaya Dam
- Kılıçkaya, Aydıntepe
- Kılıçkaya, Çay
- Kılıçkaya, Ceyhan
- Kılıçkaya, Çınar
- Kılıçkaya, Erzincan
- Kılıçkaya, Sivrice
