= Karasungur =

Karasungur can refer to:

- Karasungur, Çınar
- Karasungur, Kovancılar
