= Alancık =

Alancık (literally "little field") is a Turkish place name that may refer to the following places in Turkey:

- Alancık, Çınar
- Alancık, Mecitözü
- Alancık, Sincik, a village in the district of Sincik, Adıyaman Province
- Alancık, Vezirköprü, a village in the district of Vezirköprü, Samsun Province
- Alancık, Yenice
