= Görece =

Görece may refer to:

- Görece, Çınar
- Görece, Menderes
