= Muratcık =

Muratçık can refer to:

- Muratcık, Çınar
- Muratçık, Elâzığ
