= Belenli =

Belenli can refer to:

- Belenli, Bayramören
- Belenli, Çınar
- Belenli, Kahta
- Belenli, Kaş
- Belenli, Kemer
