= Karabudak =

Karabudak can refer to:

- Karabudak, Çınar
- Karabudak, Hınıs
