= Bellitaş =

Bellitaş can refer to:

- Bellitaş, Çınar
- Bellitaş, Hınıs
