= Başaklı =

Başaklı can refer to:

- Başaklı, Çınar
- Başaklı, Oltu
