= Yeşilbağ =

Yeşilbağ can refer to:

- Yeşilbağ, Çınar
- Yeşilbağ, Manavgat
