= Başalan =

Başalan (literally "head taker") is a Turkish place name that may refer to the following places in Turkey:

- Başalan, Bozdoğan, a village in the district of Bozdoğan, Aydın Province
- Başalan, Çınar
- Başalan, Vezirköprü, a village in the district of Vezirköprü, Samsun Province
