= Yeşiltaş =

Yeşiltaş can refer to:

- Yeşiltaş, Çınar
- Yeşiltaş, Yüksekova
