= Bördübet =

Wildlife development area in Turkey

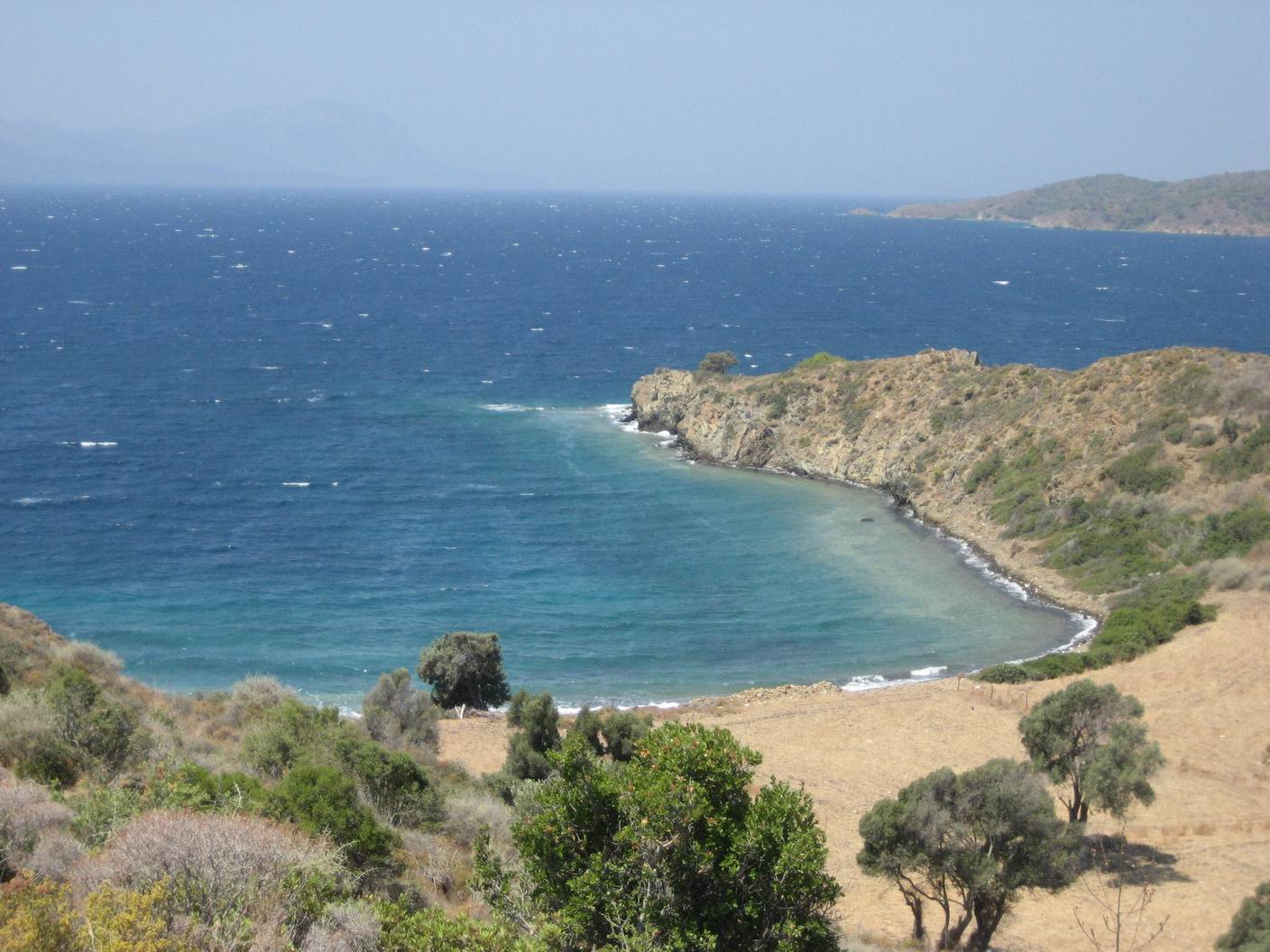

Bördübet (Bördübet Yaban Hayatı Geliştirme Sahası) is a “wildlife development area” in Turkey near Marmaris. One of the most important predators is caracal. In 2022 it was significantly damaged as 4,500 hectares was burned by wildfire in Turkey, and this affected some of the mammals.
