= Bulutçeker, Çınar =

Village in Turkey

Bulutçeker
- Neighbourhood
- Location in Turkey
- Coordinates: 37°38′N 40°10′E
- Country: Turkey
- Province: Diyarbakır
- District: Çınar
- Population (2022): 991
- Time zone: UTC+3 (TRT)

Bulutçeker is a neighbourhood in the municipality and district of Çınar, Diyarbakır Province in Turkey. Its population is 991 (2022).
