= İncirtepe, Çınar =

Village in Turkey

İncirtepe
- Neighbourhood
- Location in Turkey
- Coordinates: 37°42′N 40°30′E
- Country: Turkey
- Province: Diyarbakır
- District: Çınar
- Population (2022): 265
- Time zone: UTC+3 (TRT)

İncirtepe is a neighbourhood in the municipality and district of Çınar, Diyarbakır Province in Turkey. Its population is 265 (2022).
