= Şekerören, Çınar =

Village in Turkey

Şekerören
- Neighbourhood
- Location in Turkey
- Coordinates: 37°44′47″N 40°27′34″E
- Country: Turkey
- Province: Diyarbakır
- District: Çınar
- Population (2022): 112
- Time zone: UTC+3 (TRT)

Şekerören is a neighbourhood in the municipality and district of Çınar, Diyarbakır Province in Turkey. Its population is 112 (2022).
