= Kuyuluhöyük, Çınar =

Village in Turkey

Kuyuluhöyük
- Neighbourhood
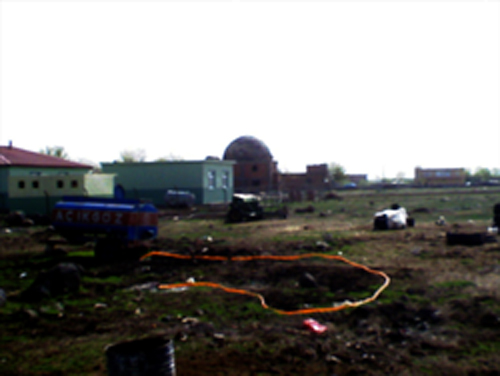

- Location within Turkey
- Coordinates: 37°48′N 40°10′E
- Country: Turkey
- Province: Diyarbakır
- District: Çınar
- Population (2022): 270
- Time zone: UTC+3 (TRT)

Kuyuluhöyük is a neighbourhood in the municipality and district of Çınar, Diyarbakır Province in Turkey. Its population is 270 (2022).
