= Sarıköy, Bismil =

Village in Turkey

Sarıköy
- Neighbourhood
- Location in Turkey
- Coordinates: 37.81501°N 40.81134°E
- Country: Turkey
- Province: Diyarbakır
- District: Bismil
- Population (2022): 95
- Time zone: UTC+3 (TRT)

Sarıköy (Note: Formerly known as Zeri, Zari, Zoré, Zore, and Zré.) is a neighbourhood in the municipality and district of Bismil, Diyarbakır Province in Turkey. Its population is 95 (2022).

== History ==
Zeri (today called Sarıköy) was historically inhabited by Syriac Orthodox Christians and Kurdish-speaking Armenians. There were 4 Armenian hearths in 1880. It was located in the kaza (district) of Silvan in the Diyarbekir sanjak in the Diyarbekir vilayet in c. 1900. In 1914, it was populated by 200 Syriacs, according to the list presented to the Paris Peace Conference by the Assyro-Chaldean delegation. By 1914, it was situated in the Bafaya nahiyah (commune) of the kaza of Beşiri. The Armenians were attacked by the Belek, Bekran, Şegro, and other Kurdish tribes in May 1915 amidst the Armenian genocide. No survivors of the Sayfo are attested from this area.

== Bibliography ==
- Gaunt, David (2006). Massacres, Resistance, Protectors: Muslim-Christian Relations in Eastern Anatolia during World War I. Gorgias Press.
- Jongerden, Joost; Verheij, Jelle, eds. (2012). Social Relations in Ottoman Diyarbekir, 1870-1915. Brill.
- Kévorkian, Raymond H. (2006). "Demographic Changes in the Armenian Population of Diarbekir, 1895-1914". In Richard G. Hovannisian (ed.). Armenian Tigranakert/Diarbekir and Edessa/Urfa. Mazda Publishers.
- Kévorkian, Raymond (2011). The Armenian Genocide: A Complete History. I.B. Tauris.
