= Soğansuyu, Çınar =

Village in Turkey

Soğansuyu
- Neighbourhood
- Location in Turkey
- Coordinates: 37°47′N 40°03′E
- Country: Turkey
- Province: Diyarbakır
- District: Çınar
- Population (2022): 426
- Time zone: UTC+3 (TRT)

Soğansuyu (Kurdish: Kuştiya) is a neighbourhood in the municipality and district of Çınar, Diyarbakır Province in Turkey. It is populated by Kurds of the Hasenan tribe and had a population of 426 in 2022.
