= Aşağımollaali, Çınar =

Village in Turkey

Aşağımollaali
- Neighbourhood
- Location in Turkey
- Coordinates: 37°45′N 40°14′E
- Country: Turkey
- Province: Diyarbakır
- District: Çınar
- Population (2022): 233
- Time zone: UTC+3 (TRT)

Aşağımollaali (Kurdish: Melekî) is a neighbourhood in the municipality and district of Çınar, Diyarbakır Province in Turkey. It is populated by Kurds of the Metînan tribe and had a population of 233 in 2022.
