= Sırımkesen, Çınar =

Village in Turkey

Sırımkesen
- Neighbourhood
- Location in Turkey
- Coordinates: 37°45′N 40°02′E
- Country: Turkey
- Province: Diyarbakır
- District: Çınar
- Population (2022): 555
- Time zone: UTC+3 (TRT)

Sırımkesen is a neighbourhood in the municipality and district of Çınar, Diyarbakır Province in Turkey. Its population is 555 (2022).
