= İnanöz, Çınar =

Village in Turkey

İnanöz
- Neighbourhood
- Location in Turkey
- Coordinates: 37°42′24″N 39°57′58″E
- Country: Turkey
- Province: Diyarbakır
- District: Çınar
- Population (2022): 1,083
- Time zone: UTC+3 (TRT)

İnanöz is a neighbourhood in the municipality and district of Çınar, Diyarbakır Province in Turkey. Its population is 1,083 (2022).
