= Özyar, Çınar =

Village in Turkey

Özyar
- Neighbourhood
- Location in Turkey
- Coordinates: 37°42′21″N 40°13′34″E
- Country: Turkey
- Province: Diyarbakır
- District: Çınar
- Population (2022): 309
- Time zone: UTC+3 (TRT)

Özyar (Kurdish: Hatun) is a neighbourhood in the municipality and district of Çınar, Diyarbakır Province in Turkey. It is populated by Kurds of the Metînan tribe and had a population of 309 in 2022.
