= Yaprakbaşı, Çınar =

Village in Turkey

Yaprakbaşı
- Neighbourhood
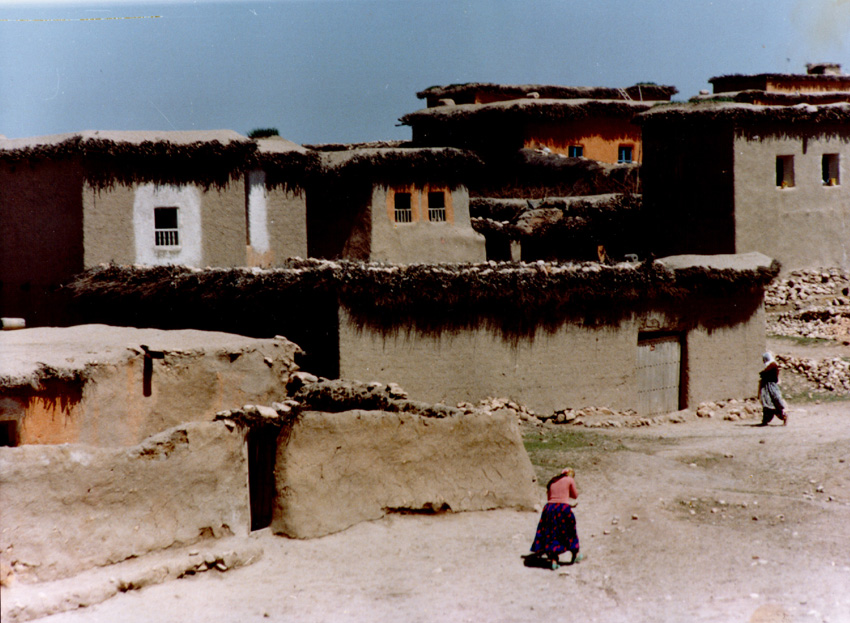

- Location within Turkey
- Coordinates: 37°39′15″N 40°32′47″E
- Country: Turkey
- Province: Diyarbakır
- District: Çınar
- Population (2022): 1,866
- Time zone: UTC+3 (TRT)

Yaprakbaşı (Kurdish: Barê) is a neighbourhood in the municipality and district of Çınar, Diyarbakır Province in Turkey. It is populated by Kurds of the Surgucu tribe and had a population of 1,866 in 2022.
