= Yukarıortaören, Çınar =

Village in Turkey

Yukarıortaören
- Neighbourhood
- Location in Turkey
- Coordinates: 37°33′43″N 40°11′53″E
- Country: Turkey
- Province: Diyarbakır
- District: Çınar
- Population (2022): 511
- Time zone: UTC+3 (TRT)

Yukarıortaören, also known as Yukarı Ortaviran, (Kurdish: Vertevîran) is a neighbourhood in the municipality and district of Çınar, Diyarbakır Province in Turkey. It is populated by Kurds of the Metînan tribe and had a population of 511 in 2022.
