= Selyazı, Çınar =

Village in Turkey

Selyazı
- Neighbourhood
- Location in Turkey
- Coordinates: 37°44′N 40°14′E
- Country: Turkey
- Province: Diyarbakır
- District: Çınar
- Population (2022): 151
- Time zone: UTC+3 (TRT)

Selyazı (Kurdish: Meşîtk) is a neighbourhood in the municipality and district of Çınar, Diyarbakır Province in Turkey. It is populated by Kurds of the Metînan tribe and had a population of 151 in 2022.
