= Kırkağaç, Çınar =

Village in Turkey

Kırkağaç
- Neighbourhood
- Country: Turkey
- Province: Diyarbakır
- District: Çınar
- Population (2022): 262
- Time zone: UTC+3 (TRT)

Kırkağaç is a neighbourhood in the municipality and district of Çınar, Diyarbakır Province in Turkey. Its population is 262 (2022).
