= Bilmece, Çınar =

Village in Turkey

Bilmece
- Neighbourhood
- Location in Turkey
- Coordinates: 37.5468°N 40.2193°E
- Country: Turkey
- Province: Diyarbakır
- District: Çınar
- Population (2022): 193
- Time zone: UTC+3 (TRT)

Bilmece (Kurdish: Golberan) is a neighbourhood in the municipality and district of Çınar, Diyarbakır Province in Turkey. It is populated by Kurds of the Metînan tribe and had a population of 193 in 2022.
