= Aktepe, Çınar =

Village in Turkey

Aktepe
- Neighbourhood
- Location in Turkey
- Coordinates: 37.7224°N 40.5694°E
- Country: Turkey
- Province: Diyarbakır
- District: Çınar
- Population (2022): 103
- Time zone: UTC+3 (TRT)

Aktepe is a neighbourhood in the municipality and district of Çınar, Diyarbakır Province in Turkey. Its population is 103 (2022).
