= Beneklitaş, Çınar =

Village in Turkey

Beneklitaş
- Neighbourhood
- Location in Turkey
- Coordinates: 37.7102°N 40.0566°E
- Country: Turkey
- Province: Diyarbakır
- District: Çınar
- Population (2022): 791
- Time zone: UTC+3 (TRT)

Beneklitaş is a neighbourhood in the municipality and district of Çınar, Diyarbakır Province in Turkey. Its population is 791 (2022).
