= Yıllarca, Çınar =

Village in Turkey

Yıllarca
- Neighbourhood
- Location in Turkey
- Coordinates: 37°44′16″N 40°08′38″E
- Country: Turkey
- Province: Diyarbakır
- District: Çınar
- Population (2022): 1,177
- Time zone: UTC+3 (TRT)

Yıllarca is a neighbourhood in the municipality and district of Çınar, Diyarbakır Province in Turkey. Its population is 1,177 (2022).
