= Uzgider, Çınar =

Village in Turkey

Uzgider
- Neighbourhood
- Location in Turkey
- Coordinates: 37°41′23″N 40°19′06″E
- Country: Turkey
- Province: Diyarbakır
- District: Çınar
- Population (2022): 323
- Time zone: UTC+3 (TRT)

Uzgider (also known as Özgider, Kurdish: Dirêjik) is a neighbourhood in the municipality and district of Çınar, Diyarbakır Province in Turkey. It is populated by Kurds of the Hasenan tribe and had a population of 323 in 2022.
