= Alabaş, Çınar =

Village in Turkey

Alabaş
- Neighbourhood
- Location in Turkey
- Coordinates: 37.7693°N 40.0888°E
- Country: Turkey
- Province: Diyarbakır
- District: Çınar
- Population (2022): 1,519
- Time zone: UTC+3 (TRT)

Alabaş is a neighbourhood in the municipality and district of Çınar, Diyarbakır Province in Turkey. Its population is 1,519 (2022).
