= Qarababa, Zangilan =

Qarababa
- Location within Azerbaijan
- Coordinates: 39°10′40″N 46°35′18″E
- Country: Azerbaijan
- Rayon: Zangilan
- Time zone: UTC+4 (AZT)
  - Summer (DST): UTC+5 (AZT)

Qarababa (also, Karababa) is a village in the Zangilan Rayon of Azerbaijan.
