= Altınakar, Çınar =

Village in Turkey

Altınakar
- Neighbourhood
- Location in Turkey
- Coordinates: 37°46′N 40°25′E
- Country: Turkey
- Province: Diyarbakır
- District: Çınar
- Population (2022): 189
- Time zone: UTC+3 (TRT)

Altınakar is a neighbourhood in the municipality and district of Çınar, Diyarbakır Province in Turkey. Its population is 189 (2022).
