= Şükürlü, Çınar =

Village in Turkey

Şükürlü
- Neighbourhood
- Location in Turkey
- Coordinates: 37°48′44″N 40°20′54″E
- Country: Turkey
- Province: Diyarbakır
- District: Çınar
- Population (2022): 440
- Time zone: UTC+3 (TRT)

Şükürlü is a neighbourhood in the municipality and district of Çınar, Diyarbakır Province in Turkey. It is populated by Turkmens who adhere to Alevism.
