= Çeltikaltı, Çınar =

Village in Turkey

Çeltikaltı
- Neighbourhood
- Location in Turkey
- Coordinates: 37°46′N 40°10′E
- Country: Turkey
- Province: Diyarbakır
- District: Çınar
- Population (2022): 85
- Time zone: UTC+3 (TRT)

Çeltikaltı (Kurdish: Kubeyşî) is a neighbourhood in the municipality and district of Çınar, Diyarbakır Province in Turkey. It is populated by Kurds and had a population of 85 in 2022.
