= Exometochi =

Exometochi: Εξωμετόχι (Greek); Düzova (Turkish)
- Village
- Location in Cyprus
- Coordinates: 35°12′52″N 33°31′37″E
- Country (de jure): Cyprus
  - District: Nicosia District
- Country (de facto): Northern Cyprus
  - District: Lefkoşa District

Population (2006)
  - Total: 624
- Time zone: UTC+2 (EET)
  - Summer (DST): UTC+3 (EEST)

Exometochi (Greek: Εξωμετόχι, pronounced [e̞kso̞me̞ˈt̪o̞çʲi]; Turkish: Düzova) is a village in the Nicosia District of Cyprus, 2 km east of Palaikythro. De facto, it is under the control of Northern Cyprus and is administered as a part of the Lefkoşa District.

In 2017, the construction works of "15 November Cyprus University" started, the name symbolizing the establishment date of Northern Cyprus.

"The Düzova Culture and Arts Fest" is annually organized by the Düzova mukhtar.
