= Höyükdibi, Çınar =

Village in Turkey

Höyükdibi
- Neighbourhood
- Location in Turkey
- Coordinates: 37°42′46″N 40°15′19″E
- Country: Turkey
- Province: Diyarbakır
- District: Çınar
- Population (2022): 215
- Time zone: UTC+3 (TRT)

Höyükdibi (Kurdish: Melkîş) is a neighbourhood in the municipality and district of Çınar, Diyarbakır Province in Turkey. It is populated by Kurds of the Metînan tribe and had a population of 214 in 2022.
