= Çınarköy, Çüngüş =

Village in Turkey

Coordinates: 38°14′46″N 39°28′05″E

Çınarköy
- Location in Turkey
- Country: Turkey
- Province: Diyarbakır
- District: Çüngüş

Population (2012)
  - Total: 254
- Time zone: UTC+3 (TRT)

Çınarköy is a settlement in the Çüngüş District of Diyarbakır Province in Turkey.
