= Solmaz (name) =

Solmaz is a feminine given name and a Turkish surname. Notable people with the name include:

== Given name ==
- Solmaz Daryani (born 1989), Iranian photographer and visual artist
- Solmaz Sharif (born 1983), Iranian-American poet
- Solmaz Ünaydın (1942–2010), Turkish diplomat

== Surname ==
- Abdulaziz Solmaz (born 1988), Turkish football player
- Esra Solmaz (born 1995), Turkish football player
