= Tilver, Çınar =

Village in Turkey

Tilver
- Neighbourhood
- Location in Turkey
- Coordinates: 37°38′27″N 40°13′40″E
- Country: Turkey
- Province: Diyarbakır
- District: Çınar
- Population (2022): 287
- Time zone: UTC+3 (TRT)

Tilver is a neighbourhood in the municipality and district of Çınar, Diyarbakır Province in Turkey. It is populated by Kurds of the Metînan tribe and had a population of 287 in 2022.
