= Çakırkaya, Çınar =

Village in Turkey

Çakırkaya
- Neighbourhood
- Location in Turkey
- Coordinates: 37°39′07″N 40°10′05″E
- Country: Turkey
- Province: Diyarbakır
- District: Çınar
- Population (2022): 1,186
- Time zone: UTC+3 (TRT)

Çakırkaya is a neighbourhood in the municipality and district of Çınar, Diyarbakır Province in Turkey. Its population is 1,186 (2022).
