= Çataltarla, Çınar =

Village in Turkey

Çataltarla
- Neighbourhood
- Location in Turkey
- Coordinates: 37°44′N 40°38′E
- Country: Turkey
- Province: Diyarbakır
- District: Çınar
- Population (2022): 85
- Time zone: UTC+3 (TRT)

Çataltarla (Kurdish: Binamma) is a neighbourhood in the municipality and district of Çınar, Diyarbakır Province in Turkey. It is populated by Kurds of the Surgucu tribe and had a population of 85 in 2022.
