= Kürekli, Çınar =

Village in Turkey

Kürekli
- Neighbourhood
- Country: Turkey
- Province: Diyarbakır
- District: Çınar
- Population (2022): 396
- Time zone: UTC+3 (TRT)

Kürekli is a neighbourhood in the municipality and district of Çınar, Diyarbakır Province in Turkey. Its population is 396 (2022).
