= Halkapınar, Çınar =

Village in Turkey

Halkapınar
- Neighbourhood
- Location in Turkey
- Coordinates: 37°45′41″N 40°12′52″E
- Country: Turkey
- Province: Diyarbakır
- District: Çınar
- Population (2022): 473
- Time zone: UTC+3 (TRT)

Halkapınar (Kurdish: Bimbarekî) is a neighbourhood in the municipality and district of Çınar, Diyarbakır Province in Turkey. It is populated by Kurds of the Metînan tribe and had a population of 473 in 2022.
