= Yuvacık, Çınar =

Village in Turkey

Yuvacık
- Neighbourhood
- Location in Turkey
- Coordinates: 37°48′37″N 40°24′32″E
- Country: Turkey
- Province: Diyarbakır
- District: Çınar
- Population (2022): 1,629
- Time zone: UTC+3 (TRT)

Yuvacık is a neighbourhood in the municipality and district of Çınar, Diyarbakır Province in Turkey. Its population is 1,629 (2022).
