= Boğazören, Çınar =

Village in Turkey

Boğazören
- Neighbourhood
- Location in Turkey
- Coordinates: 37.8081°N 40.1196°E
- Country: Turkey
- Province: Diyarbakır
- District: Çınar
- Population (2022): 1,009
- Time zone: UTC+3 (TRT)

Boğazören is a neighbourhood in the municipality and district of Çınar, Diyarbakır Province in Turkey. Its population is 1,009 (2022).
