= Karaçevre, Çınar =

Village in Turkey

Karaçevre
- Neighbourhood
- Location in Turkey
- Coordinates: 37°41′N 40°03′E
- Country: Turkey
- Province: Diyarbakır
- District: Çınar
- Population (2022): 2,218
- Time zone: UTC+3 (TRT)

Karaçevre is a neighbourhood in the municipality and district of Çınar, Diyarbakır Province in Turkey. Its population is 2,218 (2022).
