= Arafat, Çınar =

Village in Turkey

Arafat
- Neighbourhood
- Location in Turkey
- Coordinates: 37°41′N 40°11′E
- Country: Turkey
- Province: Diyarbakır
- District: Çınar
- Population (2022): 280
- Time zone: UTC+3 (TRT)

Arafat is a neighbourhood in the municipality and district of Çınar, Diyarbakır Province in Turkey. Its population is 280 (2022).
