= Ballıbaba, Çınar =

Village in Turkey

Ballıbaba
- Neighbourhood
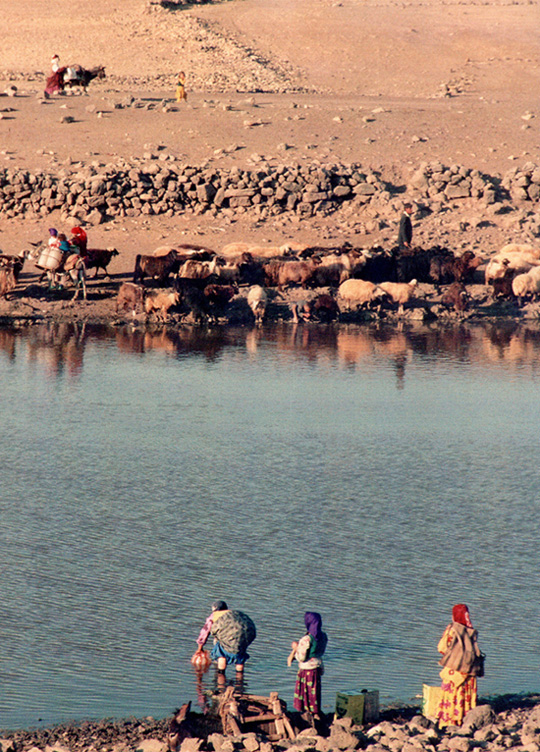

- Location within Turkey
- Coordinates: 37°31′53″N 40°14′19″E
- Country: Turkey
- Province: Diyarbakır
- District: Çınar
- Population (2022): 398
- Time zone: UTC+3 (TRT)

Ballıbaba (Kurdish: Lugus) is a neighbourhood in the municipality and district of Çınar, Diyarbakır Province in Turkey. It is populated by Kurds of the Metînan tribe and had a population of 398 in 2022.
