= Taşhelvası, Çınar =

Village in Turkey

Taşhelvası
- Neighbourhood
- Location in Turkey
- Coordinates: 37°46′35″N 40°18′46″E
- Country: Turkey
- Province: Diyarbakır
- District: Çınar
- Population (2022): 286
- Time zone: UTC+3 (TRT)

Taşhelvası is a neighbourhood in the municipality and district of Çınar, Diyarbakır Province in Turkey. Its population is 286 (2022).
