= Bayırkonağı, Çınar =

Village in Turkey

Bayırkonağı
- Neighbourhood
- Location in Turkey
- Coordinates: 37°35′34″N 40°05′48″E
- Country: Turkey
- Province: Diyarbakır
- District: Çınar
- Population (2022): 573
- Time zone: UTC+3 (TRT)

Bayırkonağı is a neighbourhood in the municipality and district of Çınar, Diyarbakır Province in Turkey. Its population is 573 (2022).
