= Ağaçsever, Çınar =

Village in Turkey

Ağaçsever
- Neighbourhood
- Location in Turkey
- Coordinates: 37°36′11″N 40°21′14″E
- Country: Turkey
- Province: Diyarbakır
- District: Çınar
- Population (2022): 1,334
- Time zone: UTC+3 (TRT)

Ağaçsever (Kurdish: Botika) is a neighbourhood in the municipality and district of Çınar, Diyarbakır Province in Turkey. It is populated by Kurds and had a population of 1,334 in 2022.
