= Aşağıkonak, Çınar =

Village in Turkey

Aşağıkonak
- Neighbourhood
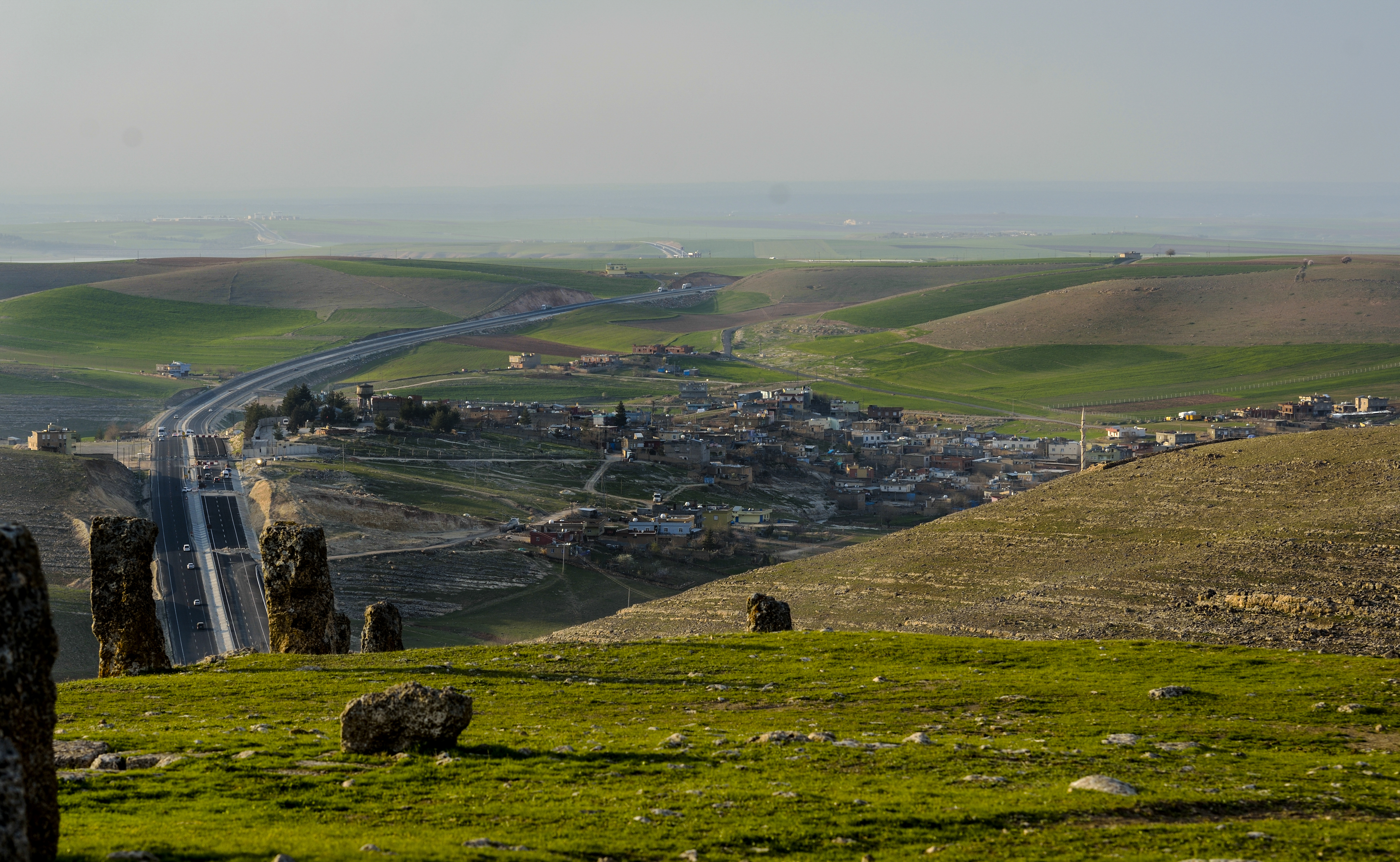

- Location within Turkey
- Coordinates: 37.6261°N 40.4932°E
- Country: Turkey
- Province: Diyarbakır
- District: Çınar
- Population (2022): 2,001
- Time zone: UTC+3 (TRT)

Aşağıkonak (Kurdish: Xanika jêr) is a neighbourhood in the municipality and district of Çınar, Diyarbakır Province in Turkey. It had a population of 2,001 in 2022.
