= Sevindik, Çınar =

Village in Turkey

Sevindik
- Neighbourhood
- Location in Turkey
- Coordinates: 37°44′28″N 40°00′11″E
- Country: Turkey
- Province: Diyarbakır
- District: Çınar
- Population (2022): 1,361
- Time zone: UTC+3 (TRT)

Sevindik is a neighbourhood in the municipality and district of Çınar, Diyarbakır Province in Turkey. Its population is 1,361 (2022).
