= Sabri Gürses =

Turkish writer (born 1972)

Sabri Gürses (born February 7, 1972) is a Turkish writer. He has published poetry, novels, and short stories. His best-known novel in Turkey is Sevişme ("Making Love"), which is a science fiction novel about the way people use their bodies in a postmodern age. He has also written a science fiction trilogy, Boşvermişler (which may be translated as "The Ones Who Gave Up"). After graduating from the Russian Language and Literature Department of Istanbul University in 1999 he started working as a professional literary translator. In 2005 he completed his master’s degree at the Translation Studies Department of the same university with a thesis on comparative translation criticism: “Vladimir Nabokov’s Translation of Eugene Onegin and Translations of Onegin in Turkish”. In 2019 he earned his doctorate at the Erciyes University with a thesis on the Tartu–Moscow Semiotic School founder Juri Lotman: “Juri Lotman: His life, his works and his legacy”.

As a literary translator, Gürses has made many translations from Russian and English to Turkish; among his translations are works by Alexander Pushkin, Feodor Dostoevsky, Leo Tolstoy, Mikhail Bakhtin, Juri Lotman, Andrei Bely, Werner Sombart, Joseph Campbell, John Smolens, Jonathan Lethem, Kim Stanley Robinson, Shusha Guppy, Charles Nicholl, Don Delillo, Werner Sombart, Fredric Jameson, William Shakespeare, Niall Lucy, David Foster Wallace, Richard Stites, Slavoj Žižek and Annie Proulx. His translation of Andrei Bely’s Glossolalia was awarded by Pushkin Institute in 2009 and translation of Goncharov’s novel Oblomov was selected one of the two best translations in 2010 by the literary magazine Dunya Kitap. In 2011 he got the Young Voice Award from the Society of Translation. His translation of Eugene Onegin was longlisted by Institut Perevoda in Moscow in 2018.

In 2005, he started publishing an online magazine, Çeviribilim, focused on translation studies in Turkey. The magazine has gone to print after 2010 and since 2013 has become a publishing house focused on translation studies. Since then books by translation scholars such as Faruk Yücel, Alev Bulut, Nihal Yetkin Karakoç, Ayşe Ece, Douglas Robinson have been published from this publishing house also called Çeviribilim.

== Books ==
- Sevişme (1996; reprint 2015)
- Boşvermişler: bir bilimkurgu üçlemesi (1996), ISBN 975-8023-31-4
- Maceraperest Turan Sözlüğü (2013) ISBN 9786054708079
- Türk Mitolojisi (2018) ISBN 9786051717197
