= Piremehmetağa, Çınar =

Village in Turkey

Piremehmetağa
- Neighbourhood
- Location in Turkey
- Coordinates: 37.5495°N 39.9850°E
- Country: Turkey
- Province: Diyarbakır
- District: Çınar
- Population (2022): 185
- Time zone: UTC+3 (TRT)

Piremehmetağa (also: Biramehmetağa) is a neighbourhood in the municipality and district of Çınar, Diyarbakır Province in Turkey. Its population is 185 (2022).
