= Sürendal, Çınar =

Village in Turkey

Sürendal
- Neighbourhood
- Location in Turkey
- Coordinates: 37°33′N 40°18′E
- Country: Turkey
- Province: Diyarbakır
- District: Çınar
- Population (2022): 692
- Time zone: UTC+3 (TRT)

Sürendal is a neighbourhood in the municipality and district of Çınar, Diyarbakır Province in Turkey. Its population is 692 (2022).
