= Kutluk, Çınar =

Village in Turkey

Kutluk
- Neighbourhood
- Location in Turkey
- Coordinates: 37°46′N 40°31′E
- Country: Turkey
- Province: Diyarbakır
- District: Çınar
- Population (2022): 102
- Time zone: UTC+3 (TRT)

Kutluk is a neighbourhood in the municipality and district of Çınar, Diyarbakır Province in Turkey. Its population is 102 (2022).
