= Leblebitaş, Çınar =

Village in Turkey

Leblebitaş
- Neighbourhood
- Location in Turkey
- Coordinates: 37°38′N 39°59′E
- Country: Turkey
- Province: Diyarbakır
- District: Çınar
- Population (2022): 1,586
- Time zone: UTC+3 (TRT)

Leblebitaş is a neighbourhood in the municipality and district of Çınar, Diyarbakır Province in Turkey. Its population is 1,586 (2022).
