= Ortaşar, Çınar =

Village in Turkey

Ortaşar
- Neighbourhood
- Location in Turkey
- Coordinates: 37°45′N 40°17′E
- Country: Turkey
- Province: Diyarbakır
- District: Çınar
- Population (2022): 961
- Time zone: UTC+3 (TRT)

Ortaşar (Kurdish: Elvendi) s a neighbourhood in the municipality and district of Çınar, Diyarbakır Province in Turkey. Its population is 961 (2022).
