= Öncülü, Çınar =

Village in Turkey

Öncülü
- Neighbourhood
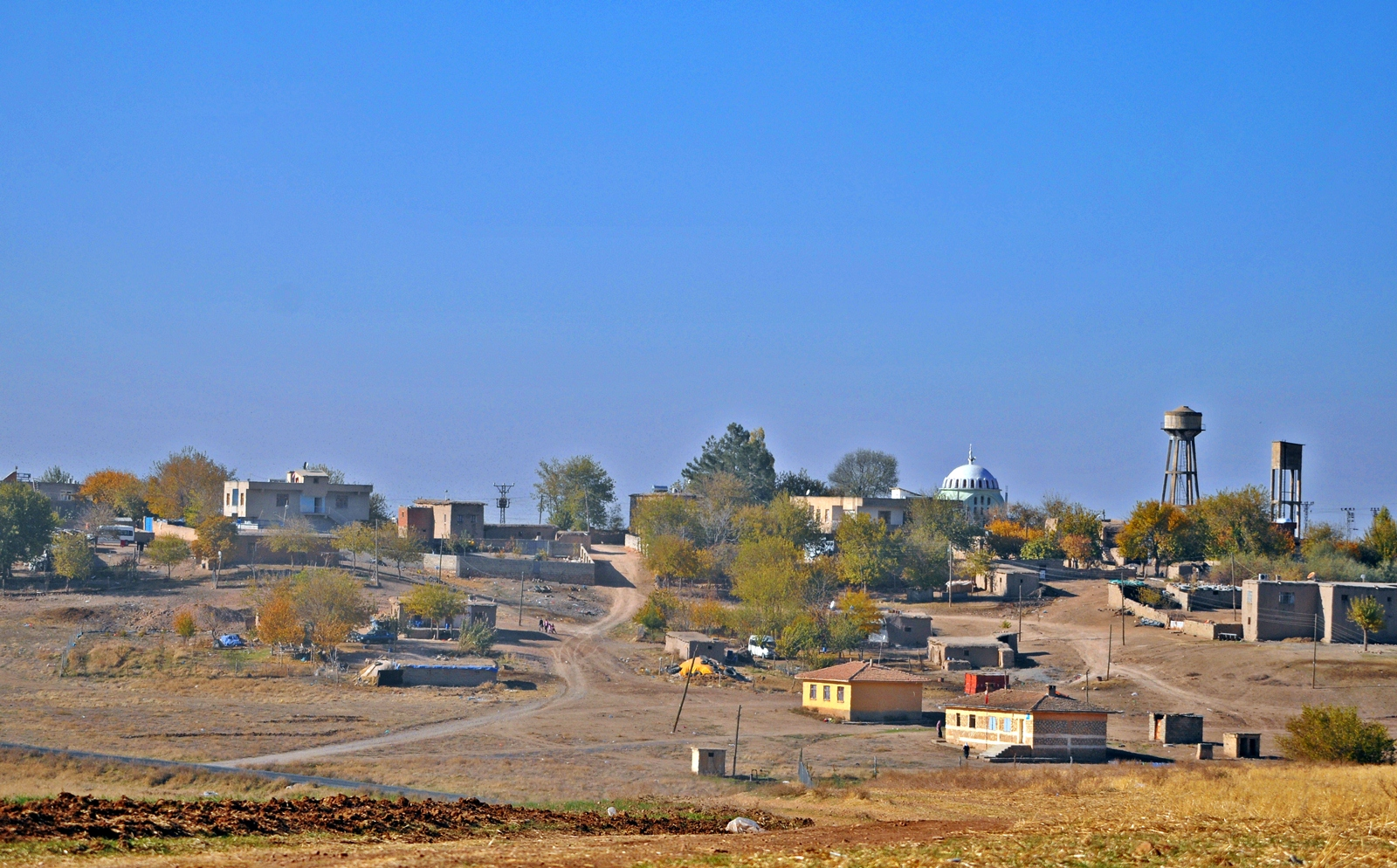

- Location within Turkey
- Coordinates: 37°43′N 40°32′E
- Country: Turkey
- Province: Diyarbakır
- District: Çınar
- Population (2022): 147
- Time zone: UTC+3 (TRT)

Öncülü is a neighbourhood in the municipality and district of Çınar, Diyarbakır Province in Turkey. Its population is 147 (2022).
