= Çömçeli, Çınar =

Village in Turkey

Çömçeli
- Neighbourhood
- Location in Turkey
- Coordinates: 37°37′59″N 40°00′18″E
- Country: Turkey
- Province: Diyarbakır
- District: Çınar
- Population (2022): 1,795
- Time zone: UTC+3 (TRT)

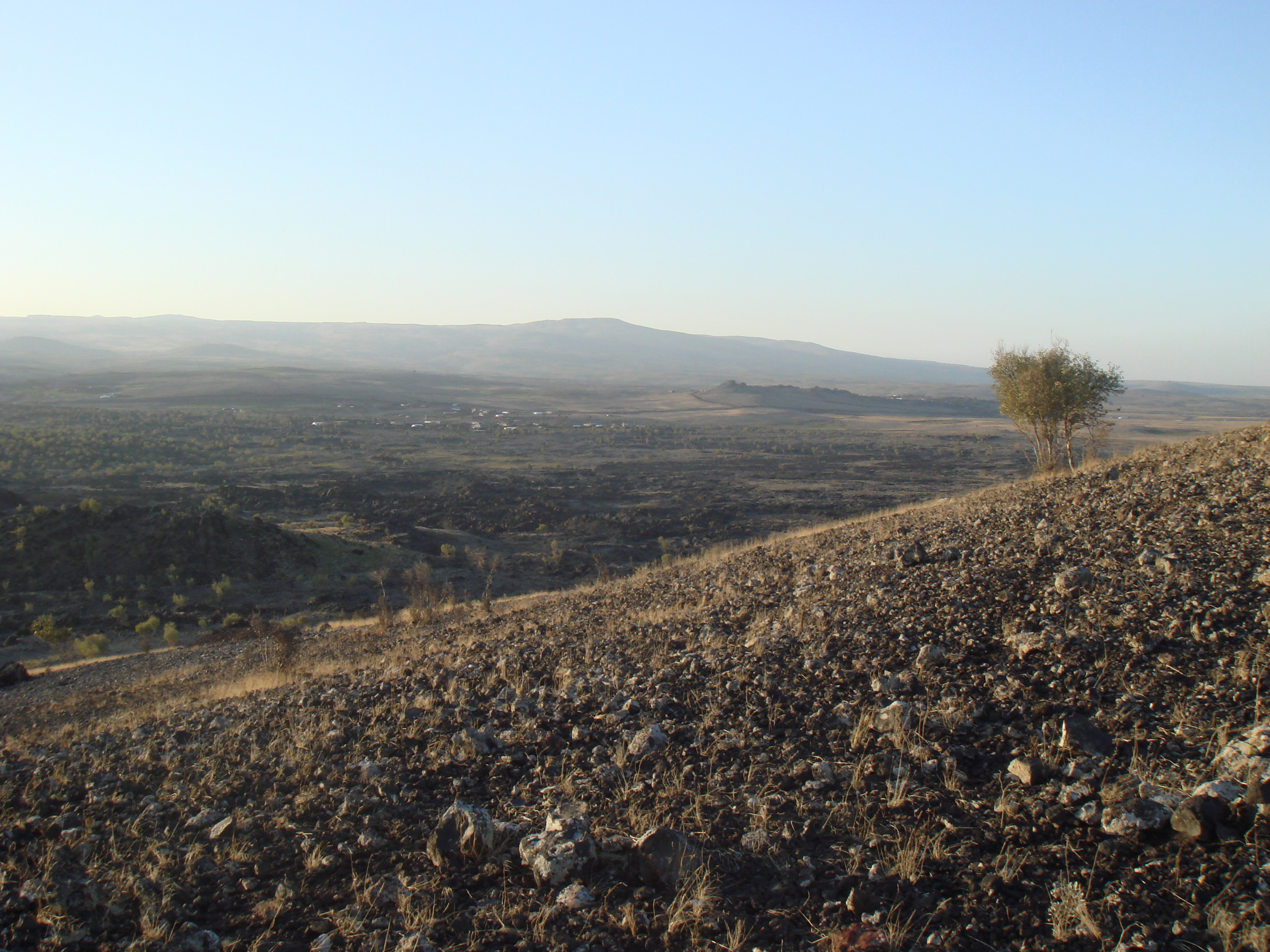
Çömçeli village, Diyarbakır, Turkey

Çömçeli is a neighbourhood in the municipality and district of Çınar, Diyarbakır Province in Turkey. Its population is 1,795 (2022).
