= Beşpınar, Çınar =

Village in Turkey

Beşpınar
- Neighbourhood
- Location in Turkey
- Coordinates: 37.7822°N 40.3645°E
- Country: Turkey
- Province: Diyarbakır
- District: Çınar
- Population (2022): 1,465
- Time zone: UTC+3 (TRT)

Beşpınar (Kurdish: Beşpînar) is a neighbourhood in the municipality and district of Çınar, Diyarbakır Province in Turkey. It is populated by Kurds and had a population of 1,465 in 2022.

== History ==
In 1939, 36 Bulgarian families were settled in Beşpınar in order to assimilate the local Kurds. However, only three families remained by 2017 of whom most were Kurdified.
