= Çakırtutmaz, Çınar =

Village in Turkey

Çakırtutmaz
- Neighbourhood
- Country: Turkey
- Province: Diyarbakır
- District: Çınar
- Population (2022): 167
- Time zone: UTC+3 (TRT)

Çakırtutmaz is a neighbourhood in the municipality and district of Çınar, Diyarbakır Province in Turkey. Its population is 167 (2022).
