= Ayveri, Çınar =

Village in Turkey

Ayveri
- Neighbourhood
- Location in Turkey
- Coordinates: 37°44′13″N 40°05′16″E
- Country: Turkey
- Province: Diyarbakır
- District: Çınar
- Population (2022): 1,480
- Time zone: UTC+3 (TRT)

Ayveri (Kurdish: Aywêrî) is a neighbourhood in the municipality and district of Çınar, Diyarbakır Province in Turkey. It is populated by Kurds and had a population of 1,480 in 2022.
