= Kılıçkaya, Çınar =

Village in Turkey

Kılıçkaya
- Neighbourhood
- Location in Turkey
- Coordinates: 37°47′46″N 40°00′54″E
- Country: Turkey
- Province: Diyarbakır
- District: Çınar
- Population (2022): 1,954
- Time zone: UTC+3 (TRT)

Kılıçkaya is a neighbourhood in the municipality and district of Çınar, Diyarbakır Province in Turkey. Its population is 1,954 (2022).
