= Bellitaş, Çınar =

Village in Turkey

Bellitaş
- Neighbourhood
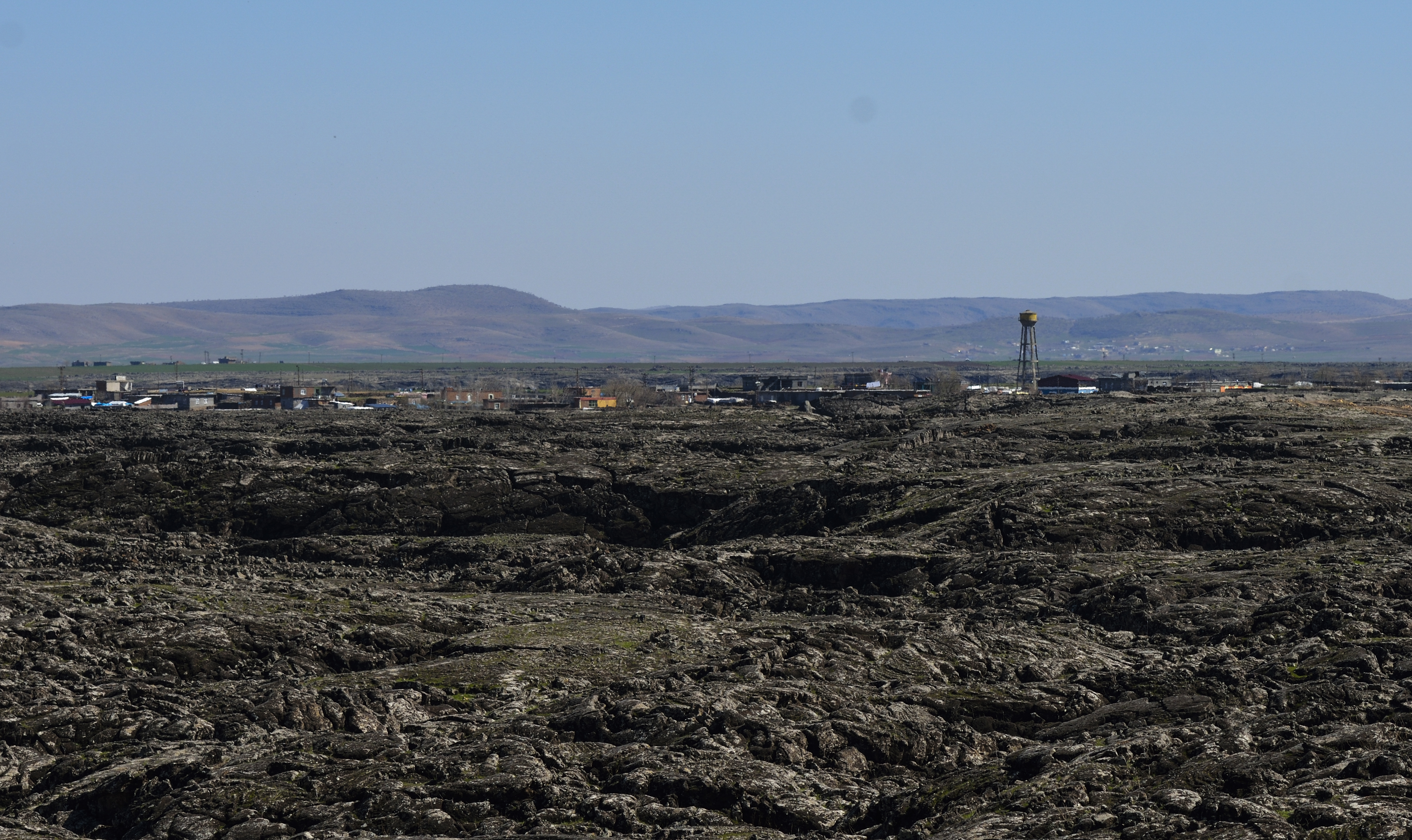

- Location within Turkey
- Coordinates: 37.6843°N 40.1736°E
- Country: Turkey
- Province: Diyarbakır
- District: Çınar
- Population (2022): 694
- Time zone: UTC+3 (TRT)

Bellitaş is a neighbourhood in the municipality and district of Çınar, Diyarbakır Province in Turkey. Its population is 694 (2022).
