= Görece, Çınar =

Village in Turkey

Görece
- Neighbourhood
- Country: Turkey
- Province: Diyarbakır
- District: Çınar
- Population (2022): 552
- Time zone: UTC+3 (TRT)

Görece is a neighbourhood in the municipality and district of Çınar, Diyarbakır Province in Turkey. Its population is 552 (2022).
