= Bozçalı, Çınar =

Village in Turkey

Bozçalı
- Neighbourhood
- Location in Turkey
- Coordinates: 37.7262°N 40.3788°E
- Country: Turkey
- Province: Diyarbakır
- District: Çınar
- Population (2022): 280
- Time zone: UTC+3 (TRT)

Bozçalı (Kurdish: Mollapolat) is a neighbourhood in the municipality and district of Çınar, Diyarbakır Province in Turkey. It is populated by Kurds of the Berîtan tribe and had a population of 280 in 2022.
