= Alancık, Çınar =

Village in Turkey

Alancık
- Neighbourhood
- Location in Turkey
- Coordinates: 37.5269°N 40.2684°E
- Country: Turkey
- Province: Diyarbakır
- District: Çınar
- Population (2022): 308
- Time zone: UTC+3 (TRT)

Alancık (Kurdish: Guhan) is a neighbourhood in the municipality and district of Çınar, Diyarbakır Province in Turkey. It is populated by Kurds of the Metînan tribe and had a population of 308 in 2022.
