= Meydanköy, Dicle =

Village in Turkey

Meydanköy
- Neighbourhood
- Location in Turkey
- Coordinates: 38°19′01″N 40°13′48″E
- Country: Turkey
- Province: Diyarbakır
- District: Dicle
- Population (2022): 1,285
- Time zone: UTC+3 (TRT)

Meydanköy (Kurdish: Haciyon) is a neighbourhood in the municipality and district of Dicle, Diyarbakır Province in Turkey. It is populated by Kurds and had a population of 1,285 in 2022.
