= Düzova, Çınar =

Village in Turkey

Düzova
- Neighbourhood
- Location in Turkey
- Coordinates: 37°37′54″N 40°35′25″E
- Country: Turkey
- Province: Diyarbakır
- District: Çınar
- Population (2022): 743
- Time zone: UTC+3 (TRT)

Düzova (Kurdish: Qerhêta) is a neighbourhood in the municipality and district of Çınar, Diyarbakır Province in Turkey. It is populated by Kurds of the Surgucu tribe and had a population of 743 in 2022.
