= Karababa, Çınar =

Village in Turkey

Karababa
- Neighbourhood
- Location in Turkey
- Coordinates: 37°39′47″N 40°14′35″E
- Country: Turkey
- Province: Diyarbakır
- District: Çınar
- Population (2022): 629
- Time zone: UTC+3 (TRT)

Karababa (Kurdish: Gelî) is a neighbourhood in the municipality and district of Çınar, Diyarbakır Province in Turkey. It is populated by Kurds of the Metînan tribe and had a population of 629 in 2022.
