= Bağacık, Çınar =

Village in Turkey

Bağacık
- Neighbourhood
- Location in Turkey
- Coordinates: 37.6467°N 40.4246°E
- Country: Turkey
- Province: Diyarbakır
- District: Çınar
- Population (2022): 947
- Time zone: UTC+3 (TRT)

Bağacık is a neighbourhood in the municipality and district of Çınar, Diyarbakır Province in Turkey. Its population is 947 (2022).
