= Belenli, Çınar =

Village in Turkey

Belenli
- Neighbourhood
- Location in Turkey
- Coordinates: 37.7785°N 40.5123°E
- Country: Turkey
- Province: Diyarbakır
- District: Çınar
- Population (2022): 373
- Time zone: UTC+3 (TRT)

Belenli is a neighbourhood in the municipality and district of Çınar, Diyarbakır Province in Turkey. Its population is 373 (2022).
