= Gürses, Çınar =

Gürses Davudi
- Neighbourhood
- Location in Turkey
- Coordinates: 37°40′34″N 40°21′3″E
- Country: Turkey
- Province: Diyarbakır
- District: Çınar
- Population (2022): 55
- Time zone: UTC+3 (TRT)
- Postal code: 21750

Gürses (Kurmanji: Davudi) is a neighbourhood in the municipality and district of Çınar, Diyarbakır Province in Turkey. Its population is 55 (2022). The village is inhabited by Yazidis. The village is located ca. 9 kilometres (5.6 mi) southwest of Çınar in southeastern Anatolia.
