= Meydanköy, Çınar =

Village in Turkey

Meydanköy
- Neighbourhood
- Location in Turkey
- Coordinates: 37°39′3″N 40°37′16″E
- Country: Turkey
- Province: Diyarbakır
- District: Çınar
- Population (2022): 421
- Time zone: UTC+3 (TRT)

Meydanköy (Kurdish: Şorşib) is a neighbourhood in the municipality and district of Çınar, Diyarbakır Province in Turkey. It is populated by Kurds of the Surgucu tribe and had a population of 421 in 2022.
