= Başalan, Çınar =

Village in Turkey

Başalan
- Neighbourhood
- Location in Turkey
- Coordinates: 37.7905°N 40.4757°E
- Country: Turkey
- Province: Diyarbakır
- District: Çınar
- Population (2022): 1,508
- Time zone: UTC+3 (TRT)

Başalan (Kurdish: Sergelya) is a neighbourhood in the municipality and district of Çınar, Diyarbakır Province in Turkey. It is populated by Kurds and had a population of 1,508 in 2022.
