= Muratcık, Çınar =

Village in Turkey

Muratcık
- Neighbourhood
- Location in Turkey
- Coordinates: 37°35′2″N 40°11′20″E
- Country: Turkey
- Province: Diyarbakır
- District: Çınar
- Population (2022): 391
- Time zone: UTC+3 (TRT)

Muratcık (Kurdish: Birik) is a neighbourhood in the municipality and district of Çınar, Diyarbakır Province in Turkey. It is populated by Kurds of the Metînan tribe and had a population of 391 in 2022.
