= Yazçiçeği, Çınar =

Village in Turkey

Yazçiçeği
- Neighbourhood
- Location in Turkey
- Coordinates: 37°36′N 40°23′E
- Country: Turkey
- Province: Diyarbakır
- District: Çınar
- Population (2022): 902
- Time zone: UTC+3 (TRT)

Yazçiçeği is a neighbourhood in the municipality and district of Çınar, Diyarbakır Province in Turkey. Its population is 902 (2022).
