= Karasungur, Çınar =

Village in Turkey

Karasungur
- Neighbourhood
- Location in Turkey
- Coordinates: 37°36′24″N 39°59′09″E
- Country: Turkey
- Province: Diyarbakır
- District: Çınar
- Population (2022): 2,225
- Time zone: UTC+3 (TRT)

Karasungur is a neighbourhood in the municipality and district of Çınar, Diyarbakır Province in Turkey. Its population is 2,225 (2022).
