= Başaklı, Çınar =

Village in Turkey

Başaklı
- Neighbourhood
- Location in Turkey
- Coordinates: 37.8257°N 40.4552°E
- Country: Turkey
- Province: Diyarbakır
- District: Çınar
- Population (2022): 2,036
- Time zone: UTC+3 (TRT)

Başaklı is a neighbourhood in the municipality and district of Çınar, Diyarbakır Province in Turkey. Its population is 2,036 (2022).
