= Çınarköy, Çınar =

Village in Turkey

Çınarköy
- Neighbourhood
- Location in Turkey
- Coordinates: 37°37′55″N 40°06′00″E
- Country: Turkey
- Province: Diyarbakır
- District: Çınar
- Population (2022): 1,080
- Time zone: UTC+3 (TRT)

Çınarköy is a neighbourhood in the municipality and district of Çınar, Diyarbakır Province in Turkey. Its population is 1,080 (2022).
