= Çınar, Diyarbakır =

Çınar
- District and municipality
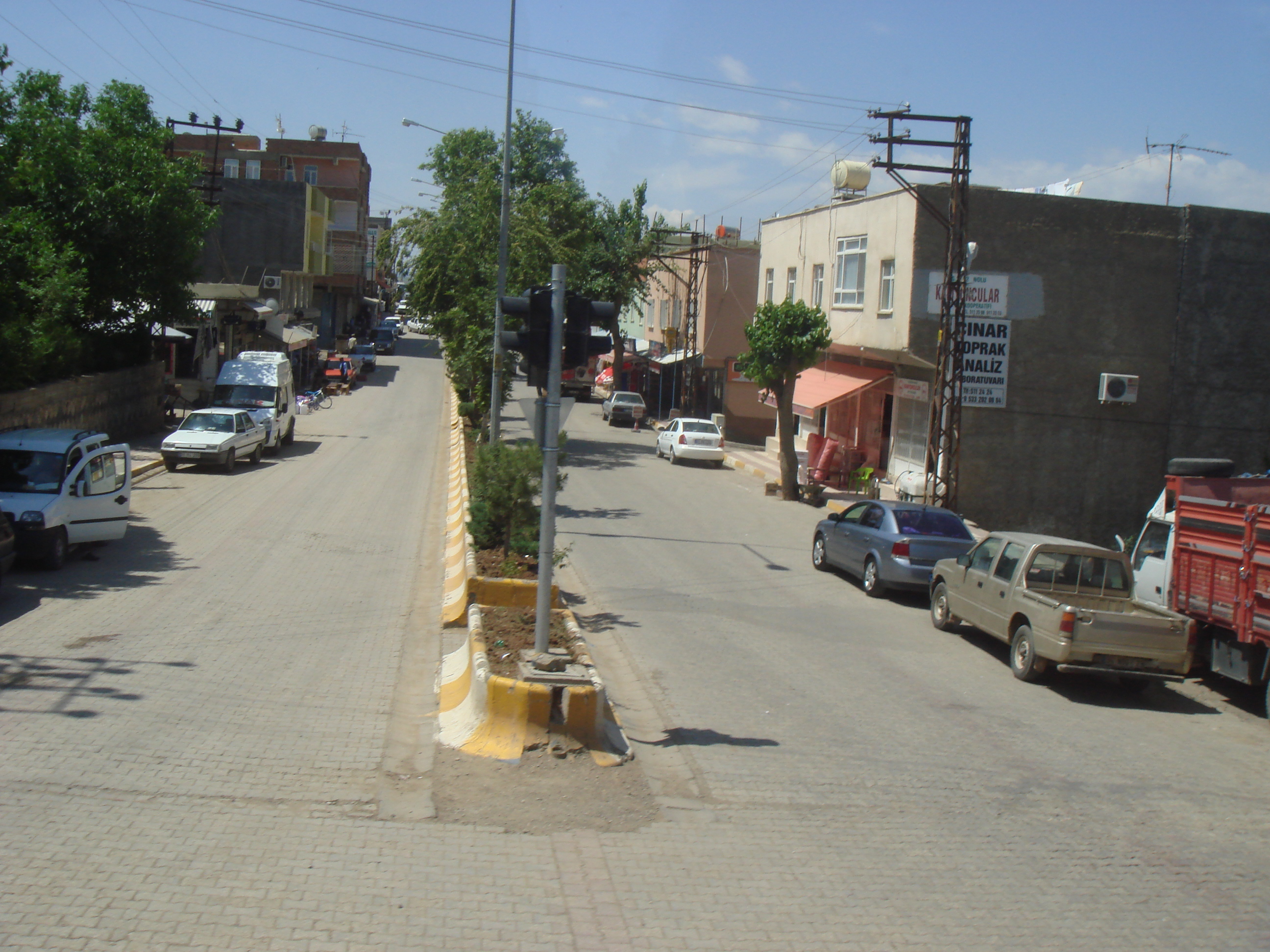

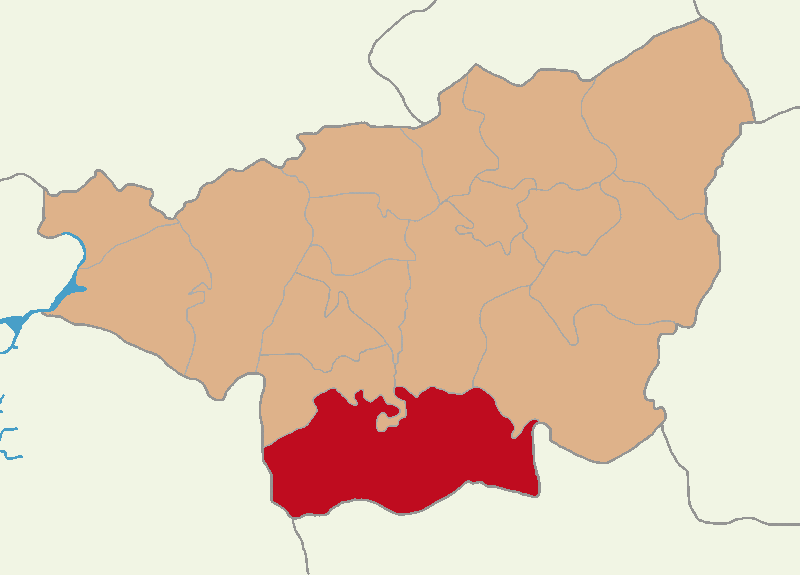
- Map showing Çınar District in Diyarbakır Province

- Location within Turkey
- Coordinates: 37°43′27″N 40°24′54″E
- Country: Turkey
- Province: Diyarbakır

Government
  - Mayor: Bedri Kaya (HDP)
- Area: 1,934 km^{2} (747 sq mi)
- Population (2022): 76,966
  - Density: 39.80/km^{2} (103.1/sq mi)
- Time zone: UTC+3 (TRT)
- Postal code: 21750
- Area code: 0412
- Website: www.cinar.bel.tr

Çınar (Kurdish: Çinar/Axpar) is a municipality and district of Diyarbakır Province, Turkey. Its area is 1,934 km^{2}, and its population is 76,966 (2022).

In the local elections 2019 Bedri Kaya was elected Mayor. Muhammed Fatih Günlü was appointed District Governor in 2022.

The historic ruined Zerzevan Castle is located 13 km (8.1 mi) southeast of Çınar town.

== Composition ==
There are 101 neighbourhoods in Çınar District:

- Ağaçsever
- Akçomak
- Aktepe
- Alabaş
- Alancık
- Altınakar
- Arafat
- Aşağıkonak
- Aşağımollaali
- Avdalı
- Ayveri
- Bağacık
- Ballıbaba
- Başaklı
- Başalan
- Bayırkonağı
- Belenli
- Bellitaş
- Beneklitaş
- Beşpınar
- Bilmece
- Boğazören
- Bozçalı
- Bulutçeker
- Çakırkaya
- Çakırtutmaz
- Çataltarla
- Çatmadal
- Çeltikaltı
- Çınarköy
- Çömçeli
- Çukurbaşı
- Cumhuriyet
- Demirölçek
- Dikmencik
- Dişlibaşak
- Düğrük
- Düzova
- Ekinveren
- Eski
- Fatih
- Filizören
- Gazi
- Göktepe
- Görece
- Gümüştaş
- Gürses
- Halıören
- Halkapınar
- Harabe
- Hasköy
- Höyükdibi
- İnanöz
- İncirtepe
- Karababa
- Karabudak
- Karaçevre
- Karalar
- Karasungur
- Kazıktepe
- Kılıçkaya
- Kırkağaç
- Köksalan
- Kubacık
- Kürekli
- Kuruyazı
- Kutluk
- Kuyuluhöyük
- Leblebitaş
- Meydanköy
- Muratcık
- Öncülü
- Ortaşar
- Ovabağ
- Özyar
- Pembeviran
- Piremehmetağa
- Şekerören
- Selyazı
- Sevindik
- Şeyhçoban
- Sırımkesen
- Soğansuyu
- Solmaz
- Şükürlü
- Sürendal
- Taşhelvası
- Tekkaynak
- Tilver
- Toraman
- Uzgider
- Yaprakbaşı
- Yarımkaş
- Yazçiçeği
- Yeni
- Yeşil
- Yeşilbağ
- Yeşiltaş
- Yıllarca
- Yukarıortaören
- Yuvacık
