= Diyarbakır =

City in Turkey

- Metropolitan municipality
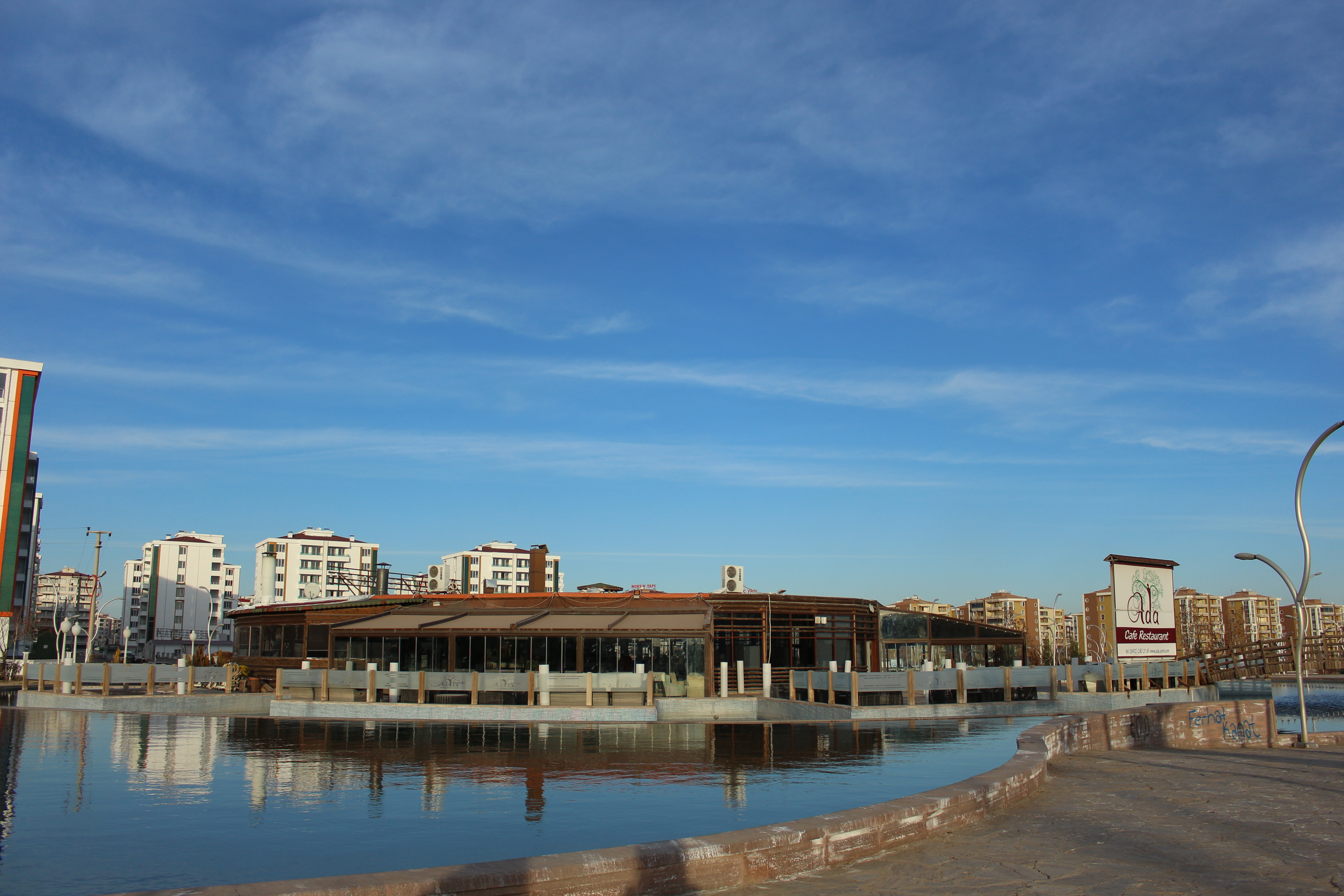
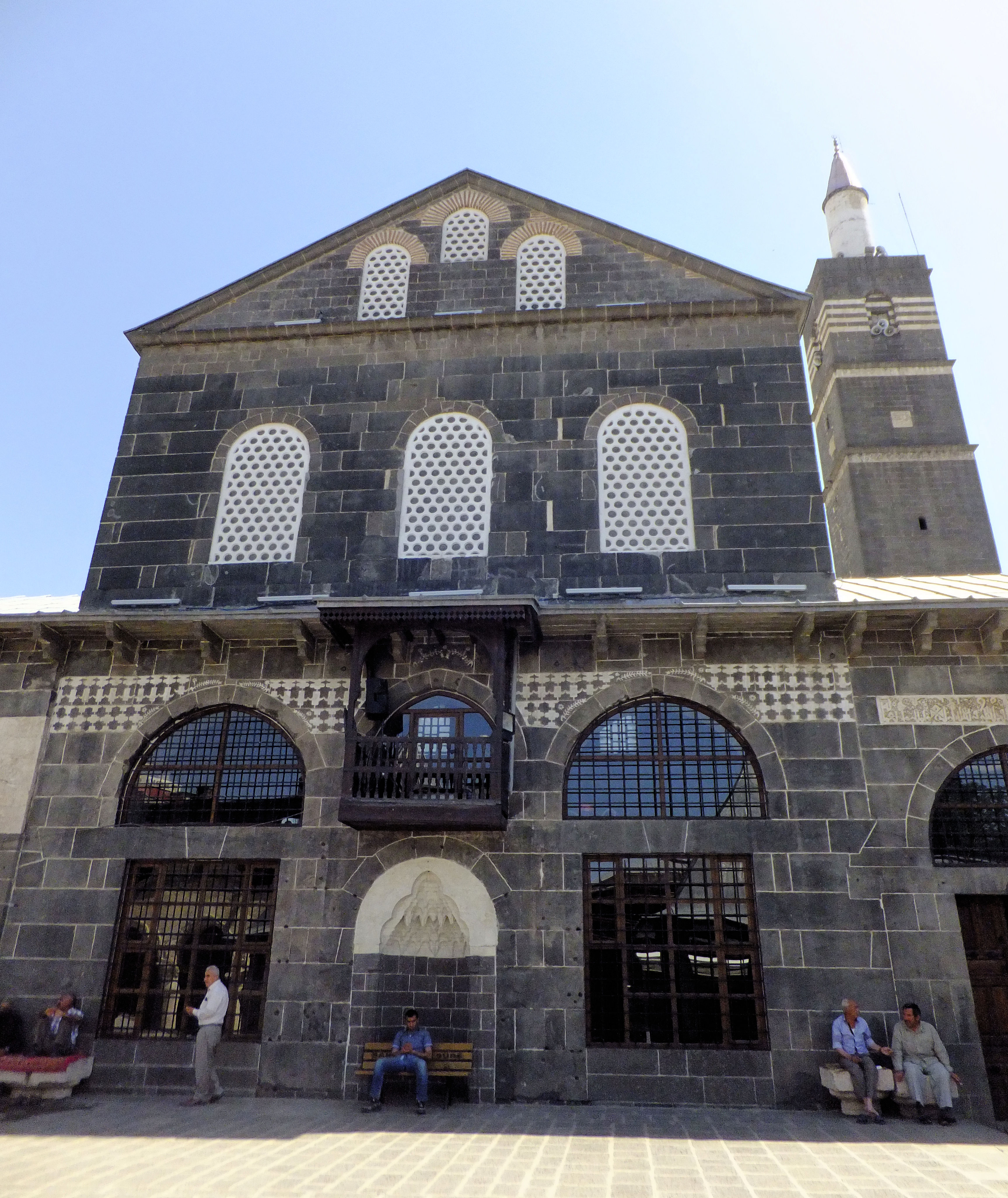
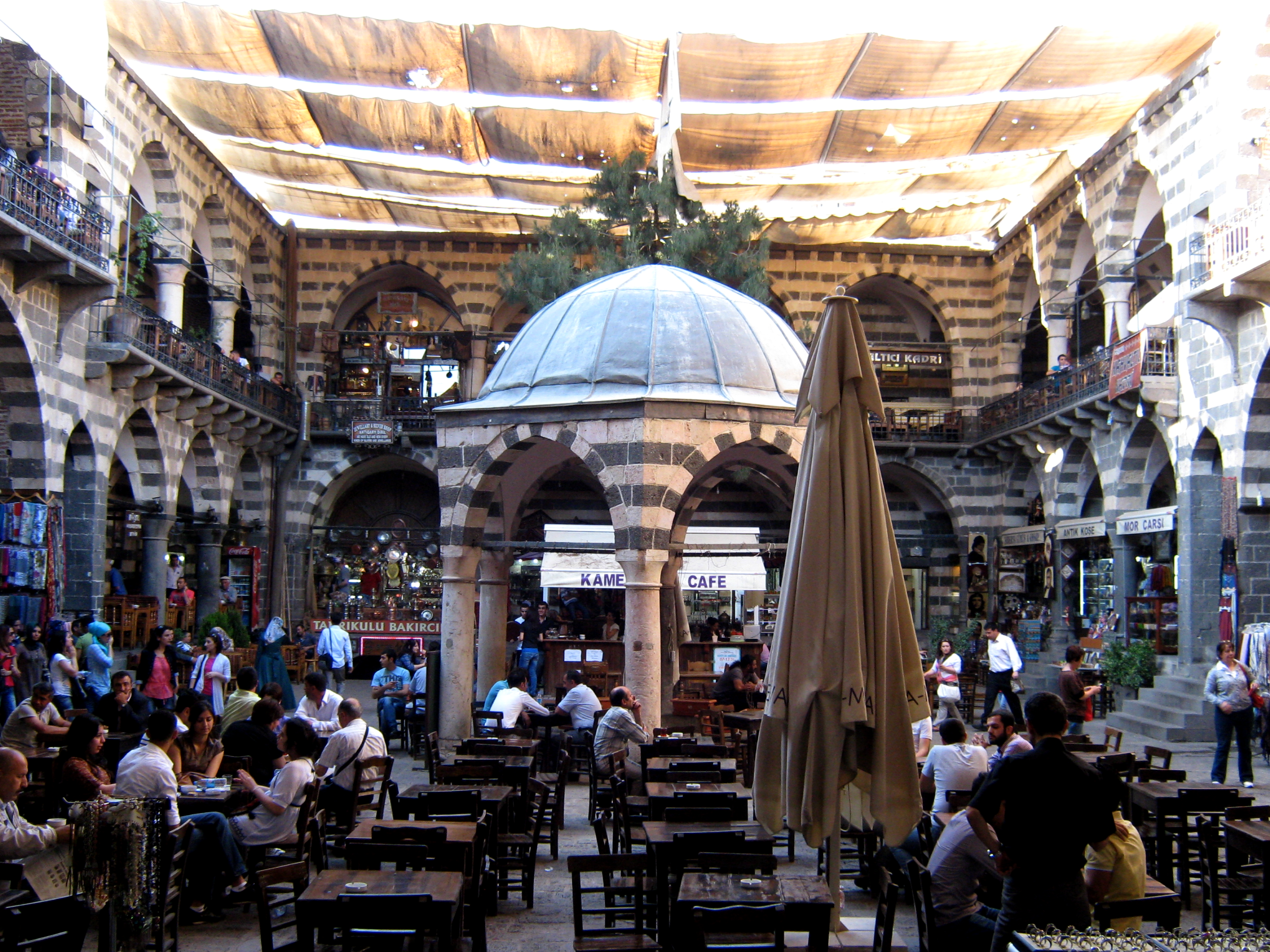
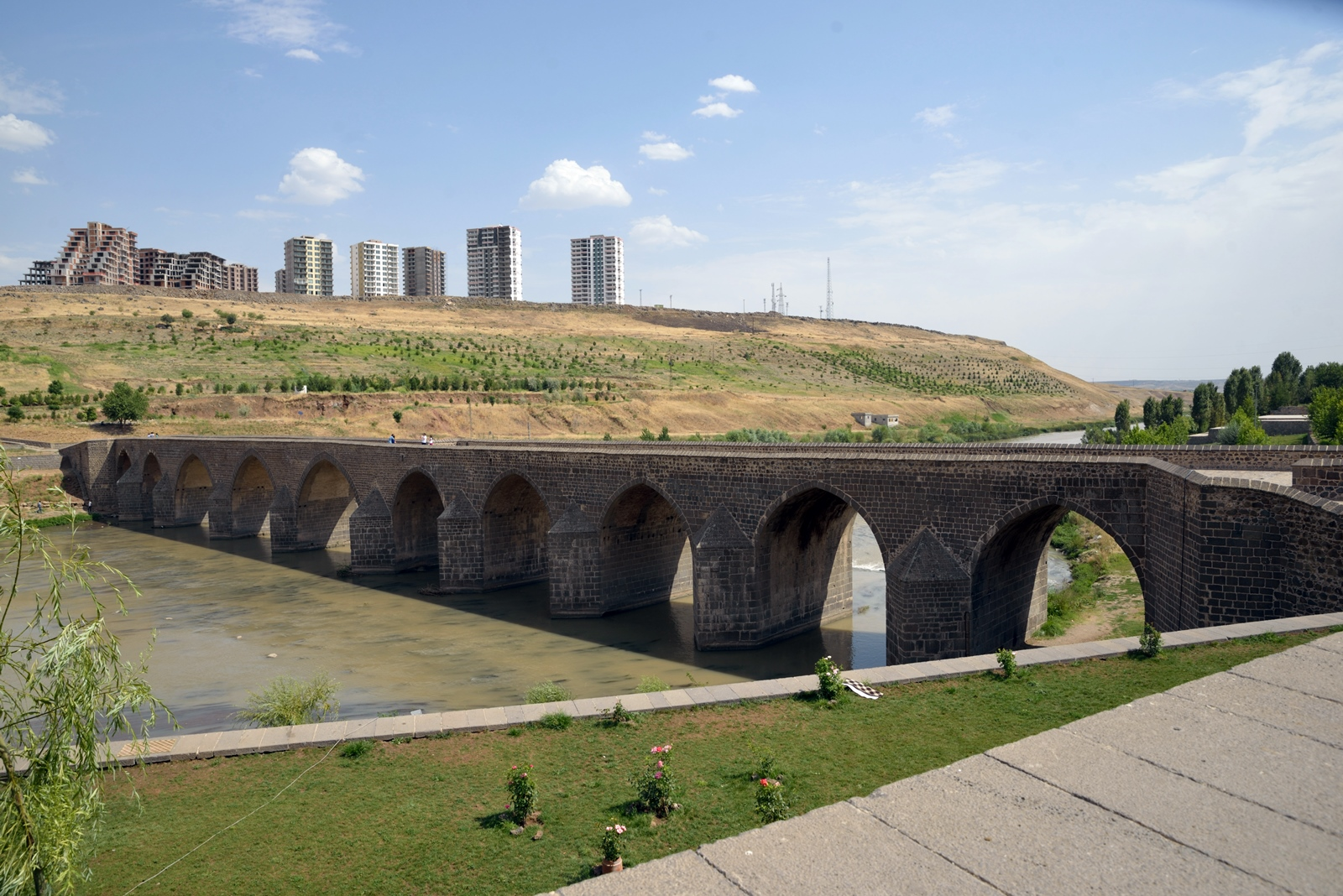
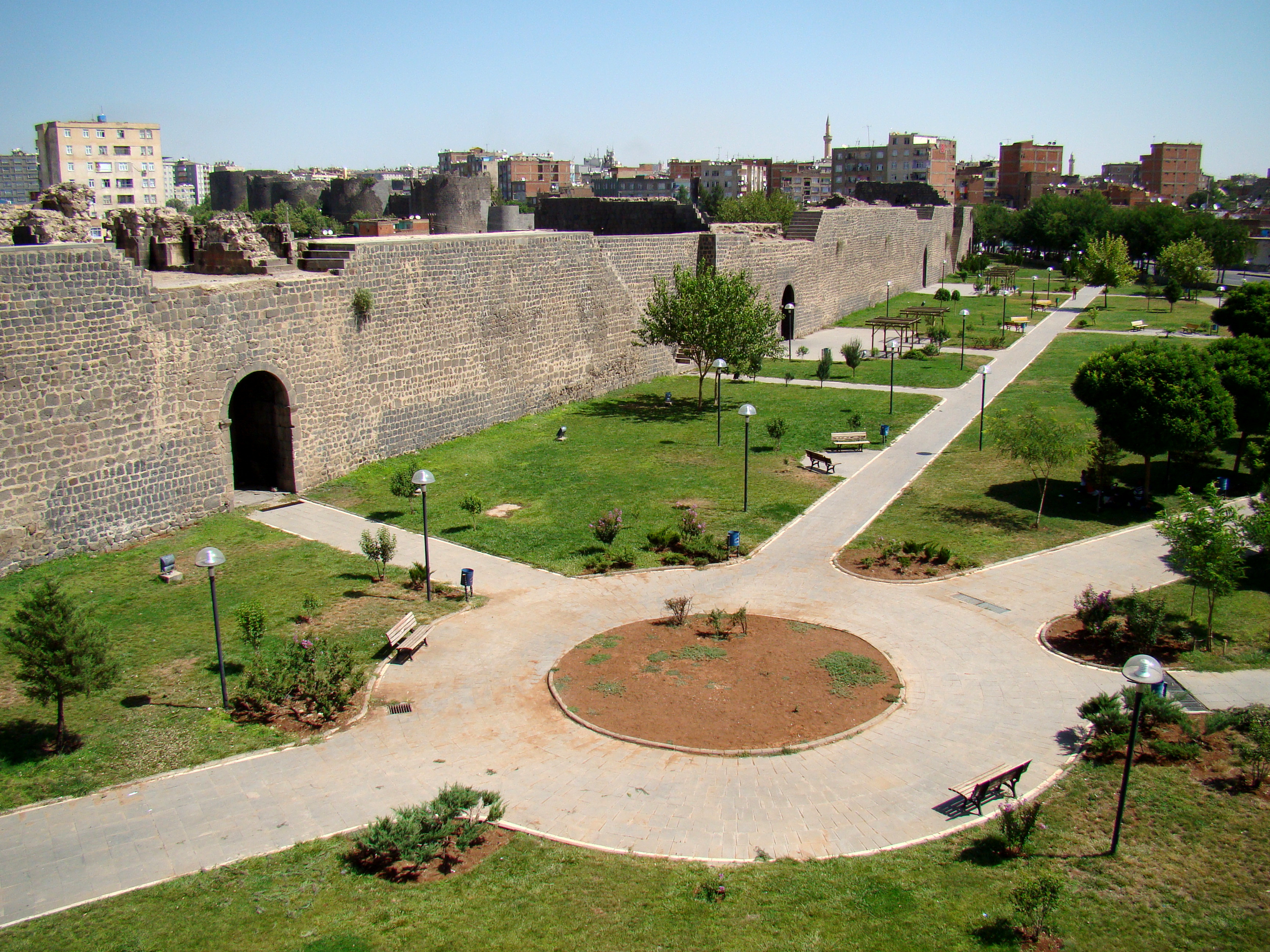
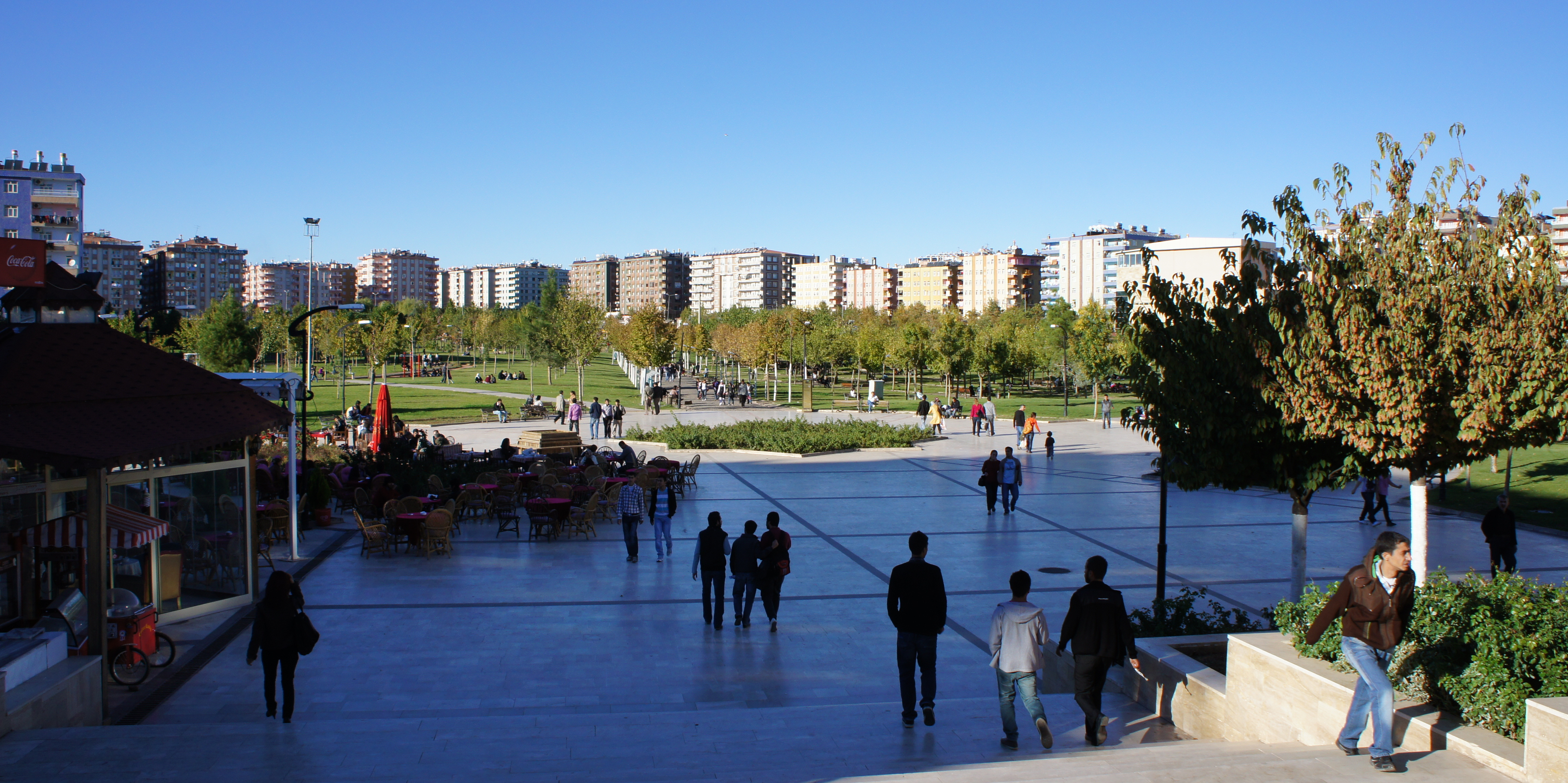
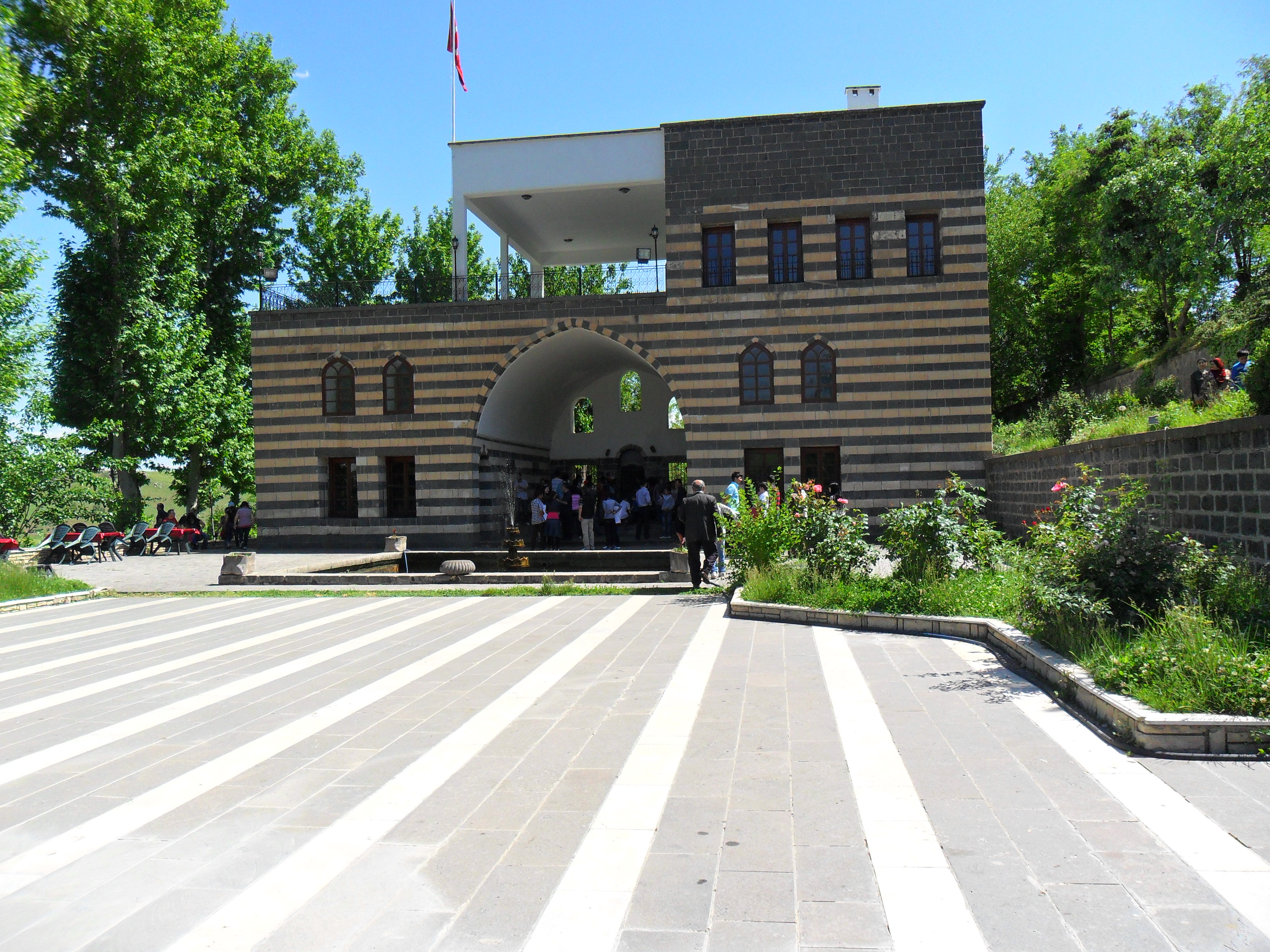
- Clockwise from top: A pond park in Diyarbakir, Hasan Pasha Han, historic city walls, Gazi Pavilion, A park in Diyarbakir, Ongözlü Bridge (The Dicle Bridge), Great Mosque of Diyarbakır.

- Emblem of Diyarbakır Metropolitan Municipality

- Location within Turkey Location within Earth
- Coordinates: 37.91°N 40.24°E
- Country: Turkey
- Region: Southeastern Anatolia
- Province: Diyarbakır

Government
  - Mayor: Ayşe Serra Bucak Küçük (DEM Party)

Area
  - Metropolitan municipality: 15,058 km^{2} (5,814 sq mi)
  - Urban: 2,410 km^{2} (930 sq mi)
  - Metro: 2,410 km^{2} (930 sq mi)
- Elevation: 675 m (2,215 ft)

Population (2024)
  - Metropolitan municipality: 1,833,684
  - Density: 121.77/km^{2} (315.40/sq mi)
  - Urban: 1,164,940
  - Urban density: 483/km^{2} (1,250/sq mi)

GDP
  - Metropolitan municipality: TRY 62.494 billion US$ 6.959 billion (2021)
  - Per capita: TRY 34,964; US$ 3,893 (2021)
- Time zone: UTC+3 (TRT)
- Postal code: 21x xx
- Area code: 412
- Licence plate: 21
- Website: https://www.diyarbakir.bel.tr/en/

Diyarbakır (Note: Arabic: ديار بكر, romanized: Diyār Bakr, Kurdish: Amed, Zaza: Diyarbekir, Assyrian Neo-Aramaic: Amedi or Amedu, Armenian: Տիգրանակերտ, romanized: Tigranakert; Syriac: ܐܡܝܕ, romanized: Āmīd.) is the largest Kurdish-majority city in Turkey. It is the administrative center of Diyarbakır Province. It is considered one of the oldest continually inhabited cities in the world, having been continually inhabited since c. 8,000 BCE.

Situated around a high plateau by the banks of the Tigris river on which stands the historic Diyarbakır Fortress, it is the administrative capital of the Diyarbakır Province of southeastern Turkey. It is the second-largest city in the Southeastern Anatolia Region. As of December 2024, the Metropolitan Province population was 1,833,684, of whom 1,164,940 lived in the built-up (or metro) area made of the four urban districts (Bağlar, Kayapınar, Sur and Yenişehir).

Diyarbakır has been a main focal point of the conflict between the Turkish state and various Kurdish separatist groups, and is seen by many Kurds as the informal capital of Kurdistan. The city was intended to become the capital of an independent Kurdistan following the 1920 Treaty of Sèvres, but this was disregarded following subsequent political developments.

On 6 February 2023 Diyarbakır was affected by the twin Turkey–Syria earthquakes, which inflicted some damage on its city walls.

== Names and etymology ==
In ancient times the city was known as Amida, a name which could derive from an older Assyrian toponym Amedi. The name Āmid was also used in Arabic. The name Amit is found in official documents of the Empire of Trebizond from 1358.

After the Muslim conquests of the 7th century, the city became known as Diyar Bakr (Arabic: ديار بكر, romanized: Diyār Bakr, lit. 'the abode of [the tribe of] Bakr'), in reference to the territory of the Banu Bakr tribe, the Diyar Bakr. That tribe had already settled in northern Mesopotomia during the pre-Islamic period. In the 7th century, during the caliphate of Uthman and under the regional governorship of Mu'awiya, a portion of the tribe was ordered to settle further north in the lands near the city. The city was later also known in Turkish as Kara Âmid ("Black Amid"), on account of its black basalt walls.

In November 1937, Turkish President Atatürk visited the city and after expressing uncertainty on the exact etymology of the city's name, "Diyarbekir", in December of the same year ordered that it be renamed "Diyarbakır", which means "land of copper" in Turkish after the abundant resources of copper around the city. This was one of the early examples of the Turkification process of non-Turkish place names, in which non-Turkish (Greek, Kurdish, Armenian, Arabic and other) geographical names were changed to Turkish alternatives.

The Armenian name of the city is Tigranakert/Dikranagerd (Տիգրանակերտ), in reference to the ancient capital of Tigranocerta founded by Tigranes the Great nearby. It is known as Amed in Kurdish and in Syriac as ܐܡܝܕ (Āmīd).

== History ==
=== Antiquity ===
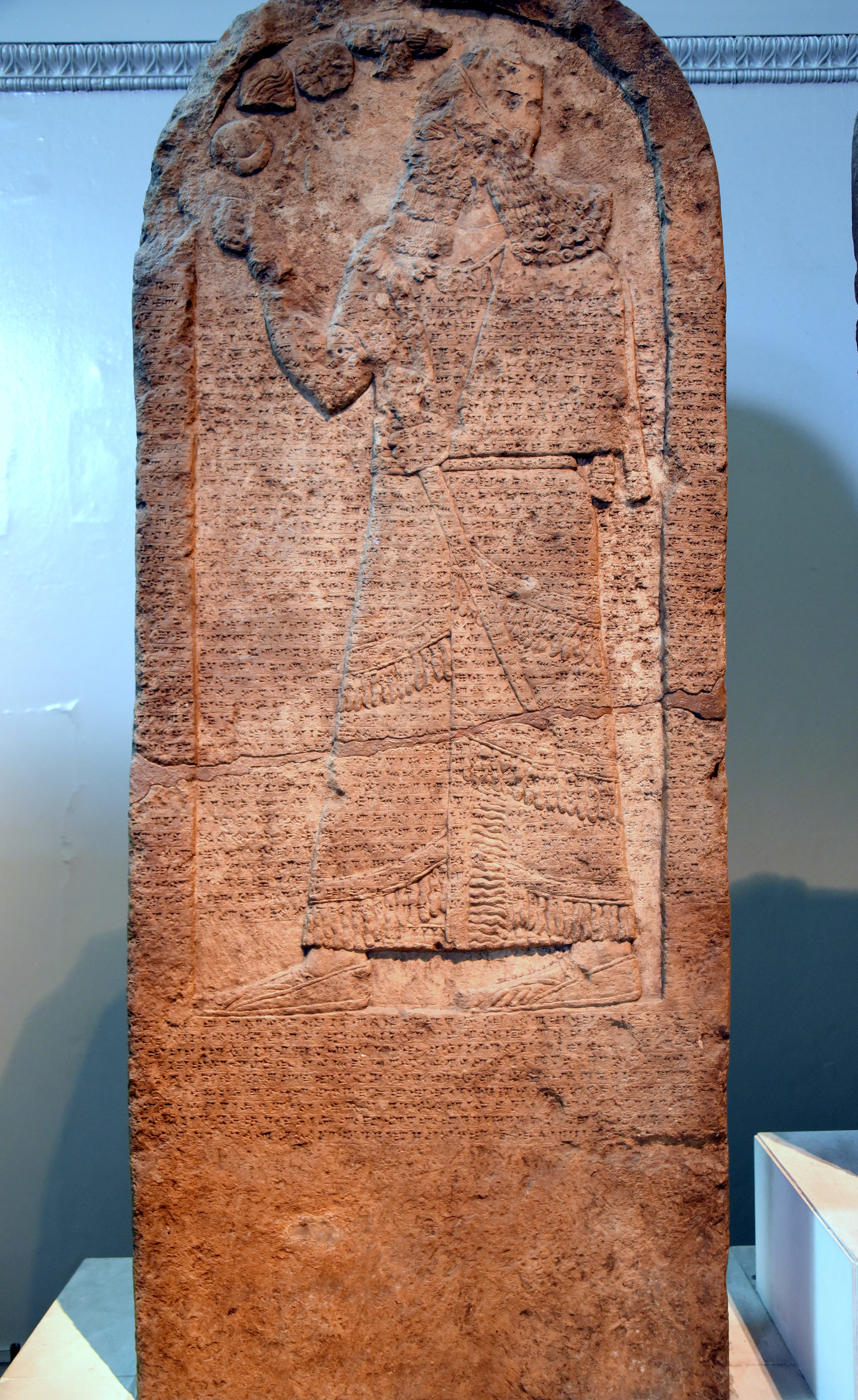
Kurkh stele of Shalmaneser III in the British Museum, 9th century BC

People have inhabited the area around Diyarbakır since the Stone Age. The first major civilization to establish itself in the region of Diyarbakır was the Hurrian kingdom of the Mitanni. It was then ruled by a succession of nearly every polity that controlled Upper Mesopotamia, including the Arameans, Assyrians, Urartu, Armenians, Achaemenid Persians, Medes, Seleucids, and Parthians. The Roman Republic gained control of the city in 66 BC, by which stage it was named "Amida". In 359, Shapur II of Persia captured Amida after a siege of 73 days.

According to the Synecdemus of Hierocles, as Amida, Diyarbakır was the major city of the Roman province of Mesopotamia. It was the episcopal see of the Christian diocese of Mesopotamia. Ancient texts record that ancient Amida had an amphitheatre, thermae (public baths), warehouses, a tetrapylon monument, and Roman aqueducts supplying and distributing water. The Roman historian Ammianus Marcellinus was serving in the late Roman army during the Siege of Amida by the Sasanian Empire under Shapur II (r. 309–379), and described the successful siege in detail. Amida was then enlarged by refugees from ancient Nisibis (Nusaybin), which the emperor Jovian (r. 363–364) was forced to evacuate and cede to Shapur's Persians after the defeat of his predecessor Julian's Persian War, becoming the main Roman stronghold in the region. The chronicle attributed to Joshua the Stylite describes the capture of Amida by the Persians under Kavad I (r. 488–531) in the second Siege of Amida in 502–503, part of the Anastasian War.

Either the emperor Anastasius Dicorus (r. 491–518) or the emperor Justinian the Great (r. 527–565) rebuilt the walls of Amida, a feat of defensive architecture praised by the Greek historian Procopius. As recorded by the works of John of Ephesus, Zacharias Rhetor, and Procopius, the Romans and Persians continued to contest the area, and in the Byzantine–Sasanian War of 602–628 Amida was captured and held by the Persians for twenty-six years, being recovered in 628 for the Romans by the emperor Heraclius (r. 610–641), who also founded a church in the city on his return to Constantinople (Istanbul) from Persia the following year.

=== Ecclesiastical history ===
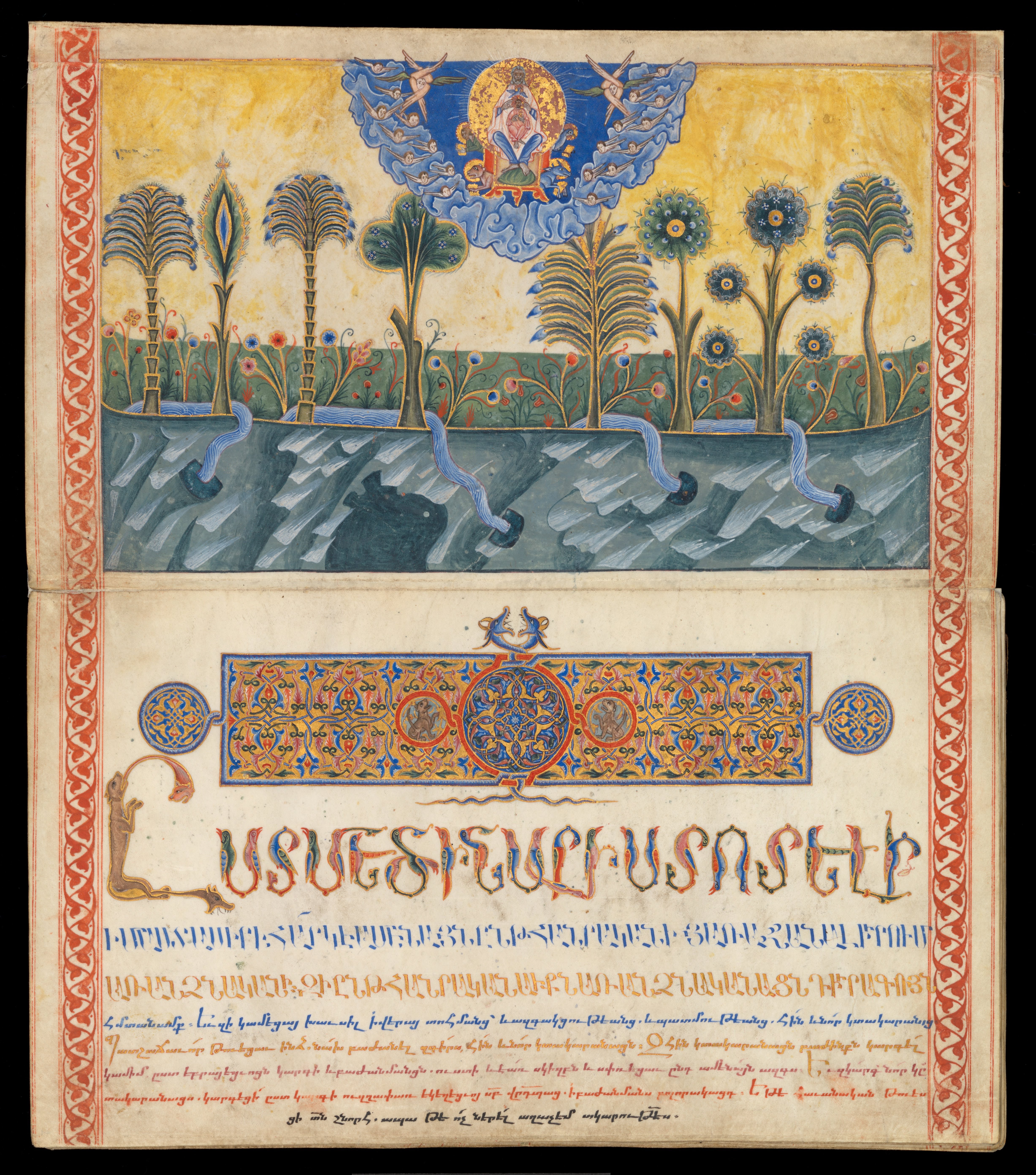
Page from abridged Bible created in Diyarbakır in 1601 by the Serapion of Edessa for the future Co-Catholicos of All Armenians, now at the Chester Beatty Library

Syriac Christianity took hold in the region between the 1st and 4th centuries AD, particularly amongst the Assyrians of the city. The Byzantine Emperor Theodosius II (408–450) divided the Roman province of Mesopotamia into two, and made Amida the capital of Mesopotamia Prima, and thereby also the metropolitan see for all the province's bishoprics.

At some stage, Amida became a see of the Armenian Church. The bishops who held the see in 1650 and 1681 were in full communion with the Holy See, and in 1727 Peter Derboghossian sent his profession of faith to Rome. He was succeeded by two more bishops of the Armenian Catholic Church, Eugenius and Ioannes of Smyrna, the latter of whom died in Constantinople in 1785. After a long vacancy, three more bishops followed. The diocese had some 5,000 Armenian Catholics in 1903, but it lost most of its population in the 1915 Armenian genocide. The last diocesan bishop of the see, Andreas Elias Celebian, was killed with some 600 of his flock in the summer of 1915.

An eparchy for the local members of the Syriac Catholic Church was established in 1862. Persecution of Christians in the Ottoman Empire during the First World War brought an end to the existence of both these Syrian residential sees.

=== Middle Ages ===
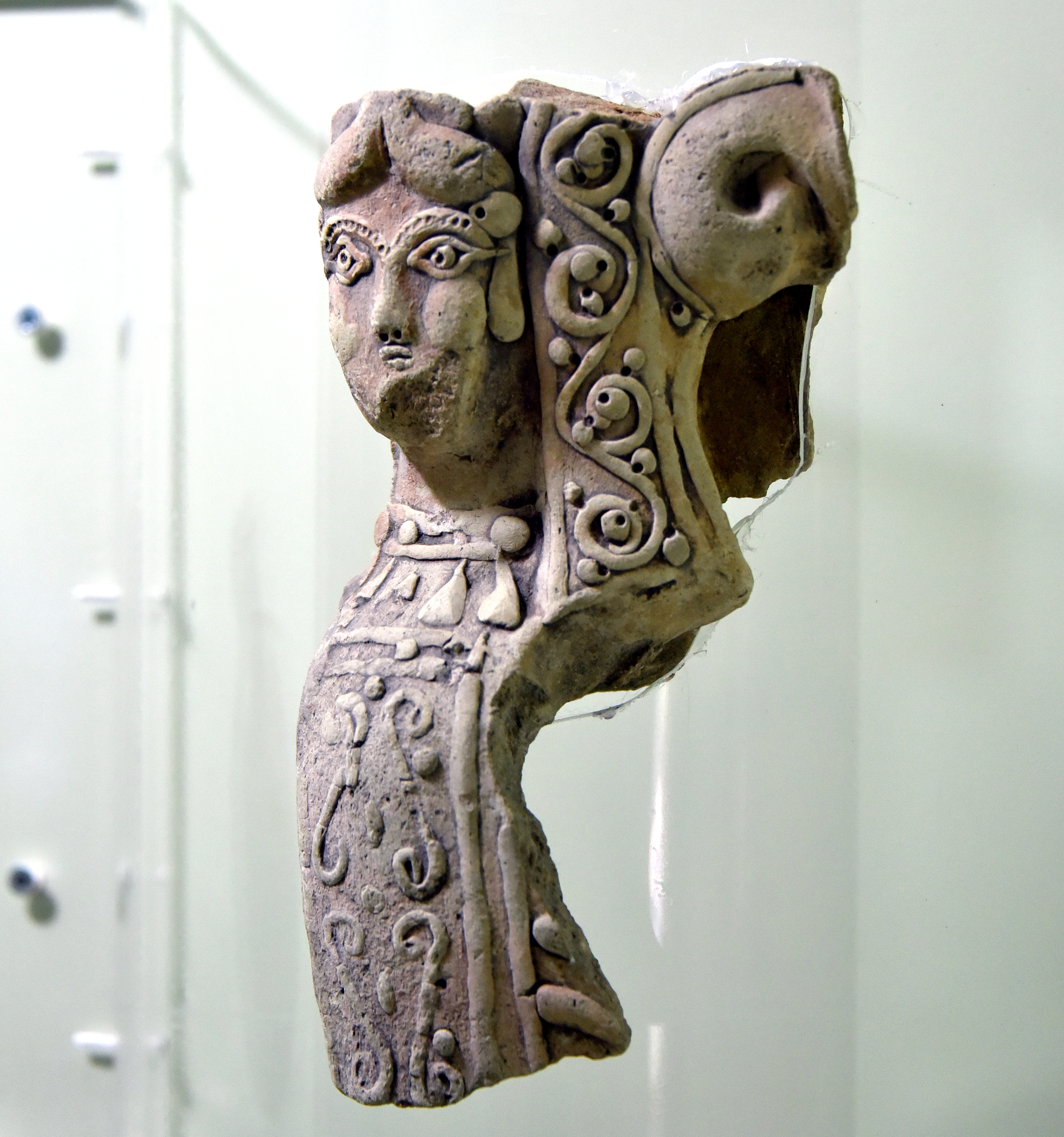
Fragment of an unglazed jar from Diyarbakir, 13th century AD

In 639, as part of the Muslim conquest of the Levant during the early Arab–Byzantine wars, Amida fell to the armies of the Rashidun Caliphate led by Iyad ibn Ghanm, and the Great Mosque of Amida was constructed afterwards in the city's centre, possibly on the site of the Heraclian Church of Saint Thomas. There were as many as five Christian monasteries in the city, including the Zuqnin Monastery and several ancient churches mentioned by John of Ephesus. One of these, the Church of the Virgin Mary, remains the city's cathedral and the see of the bishop of Diyarbakır in the Syriac Orthodox Church. Another ancient church, the Church of Mar Cosmas, was seen by the British explorer Gertrude Bell in 1911 but was destroyed in 1930, while the former Church of Saint George, in the walled citadel, may originally have been built for Muslim use or for the Church of the East.

The city was part of the Umayyad Caliphate and then the Abbasid Caliphate, but then came under more local rule until its recovery in 899 by forces loyal to the caliph al-Mu'tadid (r. 892–902) before falling under the sway of first the Hamdanid dynasty and then the Buyid dynasty, followed by a period of control by the Marwanids.

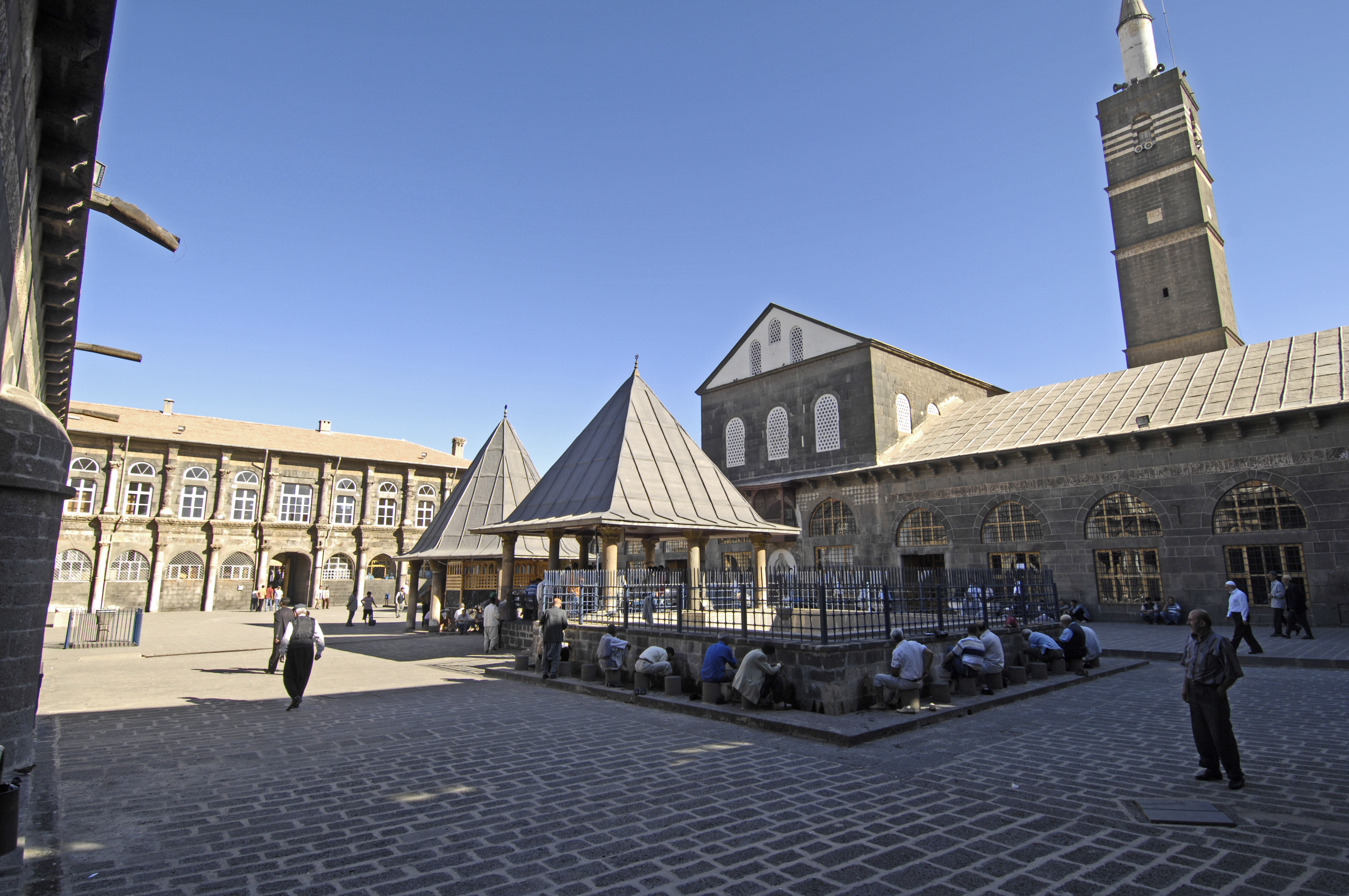
The Great Mosque of Diyarbakir established in the 7th century, and reconstructed in the late 11th century

From 983 to 1085, the Diyar Bakr region, including the city of Amida, was ruled by the Marwanid dynasty, a Kurdish dynasty, between 990 and 1085. The dynasty's foundation was laid by a chief from the Bohtan (Botkhti) tribe named Badh ibn Dustak, who captured Mayyafariqin (modern Silvan) and later Amida. After Badh was killed in 990, he was succeeded by his nephew, al-Hasan ibn Marwan, the son of his sister and a man named Marwan. Al-Hasan is considered the true founder of the dynasty that bears his father's name. The Marwanid emirate reached its apogee under the 50-year reign of Nasr al-Dawla Ahmad (1011–1061). This period is remembered as one of peace, prosperity, and cultural flourishing. Nasr al-Dawla was a skilled diplomat, balancing relations with the era's great powers; the Buyid Emirs, the Fatimid Caliphs, and the Byzantine Empire, all of whom sent envoys and recognized his rule. The Marwanid court, based primarily in Mayyafariqin and Amida, fostered a "pluralistic political rhetoric" that allowed for the coexistence of different ethnic and religious groups, attracting migration from surrounding regions. This period saw extensive public works, and Nasr al-Dawla left monumental inscriptions, still visible, on the Roman walls of Amida.

The city was taken by the Seljuks in 1085 and by the Ayyubids in 1183. Ayyubid control lasted until the Mongol invasions of Anatolia, with its last Ayyubid ruler Al-Kamil Muhammad. The Mongols of Hulagu captured of the city in 1260 (Siege of Mayyāfāriqīn), following a long siege with a small Mongol force and a much larger Georgian and Armenian force under the Georgian leader Hasan Brosh. Between the Mongol occupation and conquest by the Safavid dynasty of Iran, the Kara Koyunlu and Aq Qoyunlu – two Turkoman confederations – were in control of the city in succession. Diyarbakır was conquered by the Ottoman Empire in 1514 by Bıyıklı Mehmed Pasha, in the reign of the sultan Selim I (r. 1512–1520). Mohammad Khan Ustajlu, the Safavid governor of Diyarbakir, was evicted from the city and killed in the following Battle of Chaldiran in 1514.

=== Safavids and Ottomans ===
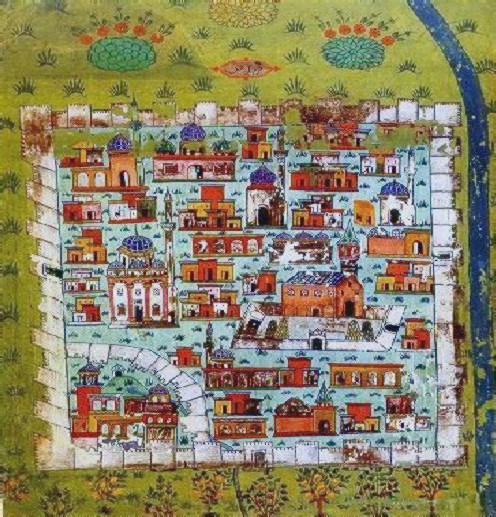
16th-century plan of Diyarbakır by Matrakci Nasuh

The Classical Age of the Ottoman Empire saw it expand into Western Armenia and all but the eastern regions of Kurdistan at the expense of the Safavids. From the early 16th century, the city and the wider region was the source of intrigue between the Safavids and the Ottoman Empire, both of whom sought the support of the Kurdish chieftains around Idris Bitlisi. It was conquered by the Ottoman Empire in 1514 in the campaigns of Bıyıklı Mehmed Pasha, under the rule of Sultan Selim I. Mohammad Khan Ustajlu, the Safavid Governor of Diyarbakir, was evicted from the city and killed in the following Battle of Chaldiran in 1514.

Following their victory, the Ottomans established the Diyarbekir Eyalet with its administrative centre in Diyarbakır. The Eyalet of Diyarbakır corresponded to today's Turkish Kurdistan, a rectangular area between the Lake Urmia to Palu and from the southern shores of Lake Van to Cizre and the beginnings of the Syrian Desert, although its borders saw some changes over time. The city was an important military base for controlling the region and at the same time a thriving city noted for its craftsmen, producing glass and metalwork. For example, the doors of Rumi's tomb in Konya were made in Diyarbakır, as were the gold and silver decorated doors of the tomb of Ebu Hanife in Baghdad. Ottoman rule was confirmed by the 1555 Peace of Amasya which followed the Ottoman–Safavid War (1532–1555).

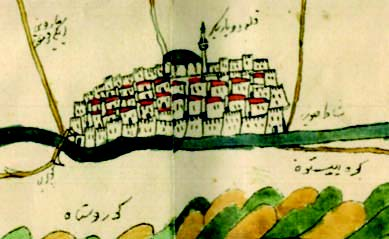
Depiction of Diyarbakır in a 17th-century Ottoman map, possibly created by Evliya Çelebi

Concerned with independent-mindedness of the Kurdish principalities, the Ottomans sought to curb their influence and bring them under the control of the central government in Constantinople. However, removal from power of these hereditary principalities led to more instability in the region from the 1840s onwards. In their place, sufi sheiks and religious orders rose to prominence and spread their influence throughout the region. One of the prominent Sufi leaders was Shaikh Ubaidalla Nahri, who began a revolt in the region between Lakes Van and Urmia. The area under his control covered both Ottoman and Qajar territories. Shaikh Ubaidalla is regarded as one of the earliest proponents of Kurdish nationalism. In a letter to a British Vice-Consul, he declared: "The Kurdish nation is a people apart... we want our affairs to be in our hands."

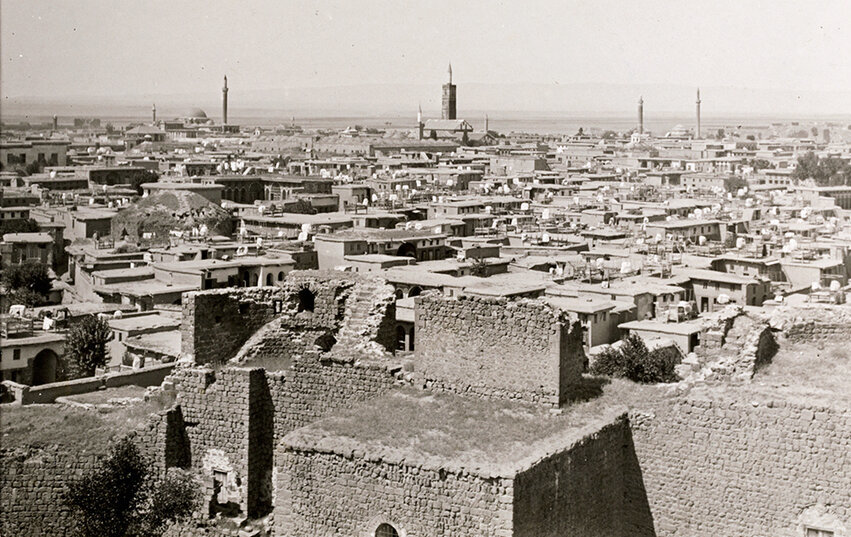
Diyarbakır, c. 1900

In 1895 an estimated 25,000 Armenians and Assyrians were massacred in Diyarbekir Vilayet, including in the city. At the turn of the 19th century, the Christian population of the city was mainly made up of Armenians and Syriac Orthodox Christians. The city was also a site of ethnic cleansing during the 1915 Armenian and Assyrian genocide (see: 1915 genocide in Diyarbekir); nearly 150,000 were expelled from the city to the death marches in the Syrian Desert.

=== Republic of Turkey ===
In January 1928, Diyarbakır became the center of the First Inspectorate-General, a regional subdivision for an area containing the provinces of Hakkari, Van, Şırnak, Mardin, Siirt, Bitlis and Şanlıurfa. In a reorganization of the provinces in 1952, Diyarbakır city was made the administrative capital of the Diyarbakır Province. In 1993, Diyarbakir was established as a Metropolitan Municipality. Its districts are Bağlar, Bismil, Ergani, Hazro, Kayapinar, Çermik, Çinar, Eğil, Dicle, Kulp, Kocaköy, Lice, Silvan, Sur, Yenişehir, Hani and Çüngüş.

The American-Turkish Pirinçlik Air Force Base near Diyarbakır was operational from 1956 to 1997.

Diyarbakır has seen much violence in recent years, involving Turkish security forces, the Kurdistan Workers Party (PKK), and the Islamic State of Iraq and the Levant (ISIL). Between 8 November 2015 and 15 May 2016 large parts of Sur were destroyed in fighting between the Turkish military and the PKK. In early November 2015, Kurdish lawyer and human rights activist Tahir Elçi was killed in the Sur district during a press statement in which he had been calling for a de-escalation in violence between the PKK and the Turkish state.

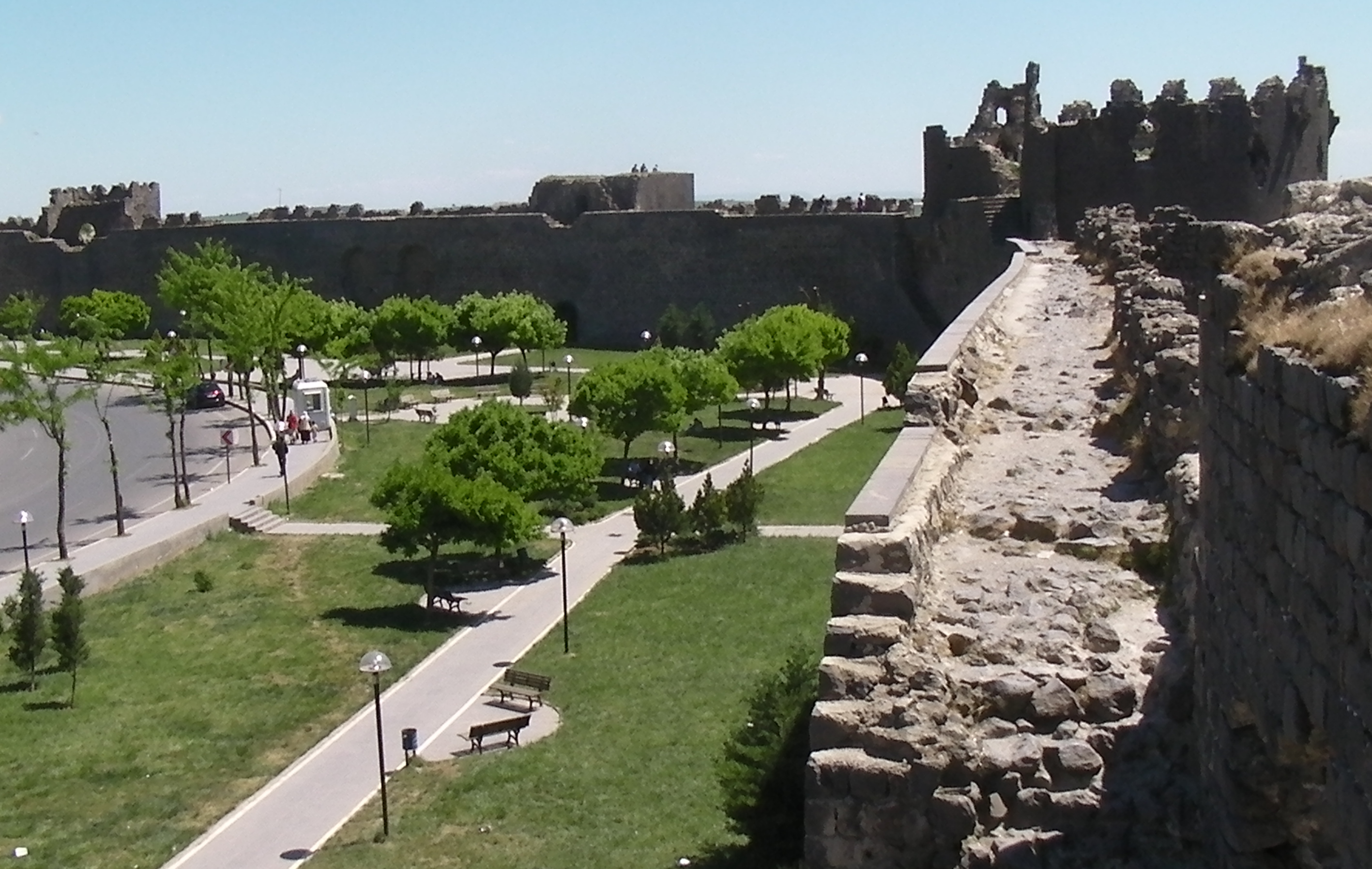
Diyarbakır's city walls in the Sur district (2010 photo)

A 2018 report by Arkeologlar Derneği İstanbul found that, since 2015, 72% of the city's historic Sur district had been destroyed through demolition and redevelopment, and that laws designed to protect historic monuments had been ignored. They found that the city's "urban regeneration" policy was one of demolition and redevelopment rather than one of repairing cultural assets damaged during the recent civil conflict, and because of that many registered historic buildings had been completely destroyed. The extent of the loss of non-registered historic structures is unknown because any historic building fragments revealed during the demolition of modern structures were also demolished. As of 2021, large parts of the city and district were restored and government officials were looking towards tourism again.

Many residences and buildings collapsed or suffered substantial damage in the 2023 Turkey–Syria earthquakes around 200 miles (300 km) from the epicentre. A Turkish professor and former journalist from the country commented, "It is like having an epicenter of an earthquake in Harrisburg and buildings in New York City are collapsing."

== Sports ==
The most notable football clubs of the city are Diyarbakırspor (established 1968) and Amed S.F.K. (established 1990), with Deniz Naki being one of the most notable footballers from the city. The women's football team Amed S.K. were promoted at the end of the 2016–17 Turkish Women's Second Football League season to the Women's First League. Diyarbakırspor competed in the Süper Lig for 11 seasons, and Amed S.F.K. tried to repeat this success by advancing to the TFF 1. Lig in the 2023–24 season.

== Politics ==
In the 2014 local elections, Gültan Kışanak and Fırat Anlı of the Peace and Democracy Party (BDP) were elected co-mayors of Diyarbakır. However, on 25 October 2016, both were detained by Turkish authorities "on thinly supported charges of being a member of the Kurdistan Workers Party (PKK)". The Turkish government ordered a general internet blackout after the arrest. Nevertheless, on 26 October, several thousand demonstrators at Diyarbakir city hall demanded the mayors' release. Some days later, the Turkish government appointed an unelected state trustee as the mayor. In November, public prosecutors demanded a 230-year prison sentence for Kışanak.

In January 2017, the un-elected state trustee appointed by the Turkish government ordered the removal of the Assyrian sculpture of a mythological winged bull from the town hall, which had been erected by the BDP mayors to commemorate the Assyrian history of the town and its still resident Assyrian minority. All Kurdish language street signs were also removed, alongside the shutting down of organisations concerned with Kurdish language and culture, removal of Kurdish names from public parks, and removal of Kurdish cultural monuments and linguistic symbols.

In the 2019 municipal elections, Adnan Selçuk Mızraklı of the HDP party was elected mayor of Diyarbakir. In August 2019 he was dismissed and subsequently sentenced to 9 years and 4 months imprisonment accused of supporting terrorism as part of a government crackdown against politicians of the Kurdish HDP party; the Turkish state appointed Münir Karaloğlu in his place. Other Kurdish mayors in Kurdish cities across the region also suffered a similar fate, with Turkish President Erdoğan vowing to remove any future Kurdish mayors too. Protests against the decision arose which were suppressed by the Turkish police with the use of water cannons; some protestors were killed. Diyarbakır's prison has become home to many political prisoners, mainly Kurdish activists and politicians accused of terrorism charges by the Turkish state. Inmates have been subject to torture, rape, humiliation, beating, murder and other abuses.

== Economy ==
Historically, Diyarbakır produced wheat and sesame. They would preserve the wheat in warehouses, with coverings of straw and twigs from licorice trees. This system would allow the wheat to be preserved for up to ten years. In the late 19th and early 20th century, Diyarbakır exported raisins, almonds, and apricots to Europe. Angora goats were raised, and wool and mohair was exported from Diyarbakır. Merchants would also come from Egypt, Istanbul, and Syria, to purchase goats and sheep. Honey was also produced, but not so much exported, but used by locals. Sericulture was observed in the area, too.

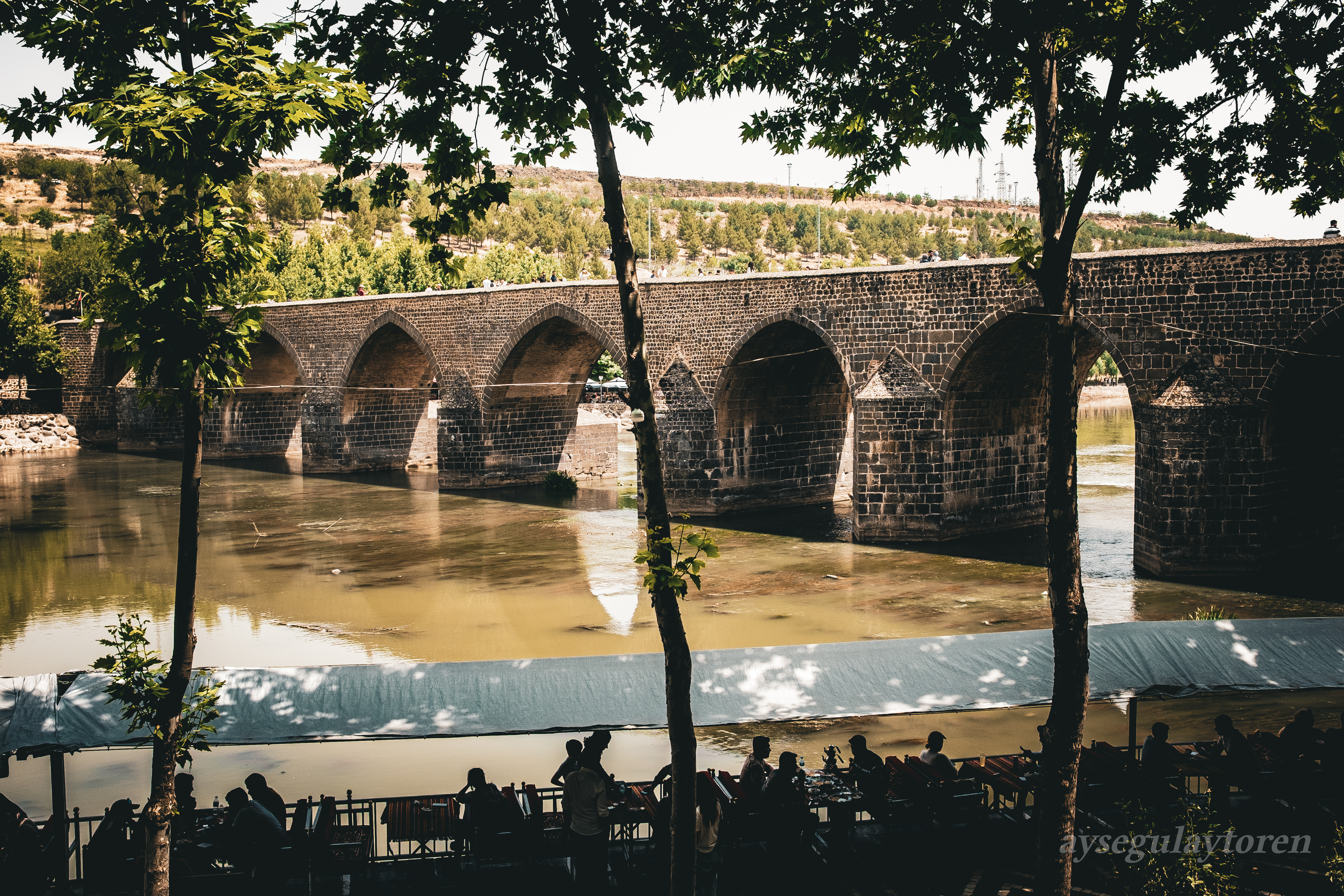
Diyarbakır historical ten-eyed bridge.

Prior to World War I, Diyarbakır had an active copper industry, with six mines. Three were active, with two being owned by locals and the third being owned by the Turkish government. Tenorite was the primary type of copper mined. It was mined by hand by Kurds. A large portion of the ore was exported to England. The region also produced iron, gypsum, coal, chalk, lime, jet, and quartz, but primarily for local use.

The city is served by Diyarbakır Airport and Diyarbakır railway station. In 1935 the railway between Elazığ and Diyarbakır was inaugurated.

N City AVM, a shopping mall opened in 2010, ceased operating in February 2026 and is being converted into a furniture retail center.

== Demographics ==
At the turn of the 19th century, the Christian population of the city was mainly made up of Armenians and Assyrians. The Assyrian and Armenian presence dates to antiquity. There was also a small Jewish community in the city. All Christians spoke Armenian and Kurdish. Notables spoke Turkish. In the streets, the language was Kurdish. According to the Encyclopædia Britannica from 1911, the population numbered 38 thousand, almost half being Christian and consisting of "Turks, Kurds, Arabs, Turkomans, Armenians, Chaldeans, Jacobites, and a few Greeks". During the Governorship of Mehmed Reshid in the Vilayet of Diyarbakır, the Armenian population of Diyarbakir was resettled and exterminated.

After World War II, as the Kurdish population moved from the villages and mountains to urban centres, Diyarbakir's Kurdish population continued to grow. Diyarbakır grew from a population of 30,000 in the 1930s to 65,000 by 1956, to 140,000 by 1970, to 400,000 by 1990, and eventually swelled to about 1.5 million by 1997. During the 1990s, the city grew dramatically due to the immigrant population from thousands of Kurdish villages depopulated by Turkey during the Kurdish–Turkish conflict.

According to a November 2006 survey by the Sûr Municipality, 72% of the inhabitants of the municipality use Kurdish most often in their daily speech due to the overwhelming Kurdish majority in the city, followed by minorities of Assyrian, Armenian and Turkish.

There are some Alevi Turkmen villages around Diyarbakır's old city, but there are no official reports about their population numbers.

There have been attempts by Turkish lawmakers to deny Diyarbakır's Kurdish majority identity, with Turkey's Education Ministry releasing a school book named "Our City, Diyarbakir" ("Şehrimiz Diyarbakır" in Turkish) on Diyarbakir Province in which it claims that a Turkish similar to that spoken in Baku is spoken in the city along with regional languages like Arabic, Persian, Kurdish, Turkmen and Caucasian languages. Critics link this to a general trend towards anti-Kurdish sentiment in Turkey.

== Culture ==
There is local jewelry making and other craftwork in the area. Folk dancing to the drum and zurna (pipe) are a part of weddings and celebrations in the area. The Diyarbakir Municipality Theatre was founded in 1990, and had to close its doors in 1995. It was re-opened in 1999, under Mayor Osman Baydemir. It was closed down in 2016 after the dismissal of the mayor in 2016. The Municipality City Theatre also performed plays in the Kurdish language.

One of the other common celebrations in Turkey is Nowruz. This celebration is done on the pretext of the beginning of spring and the beginning of the new year. The establishment of Nowruz has a long history, so much so that it has been celebrated in different parts of Asia for the past three thousand years, especially in the Middle East. In different parts of Turkey, especially the Kurdish regions of this country, Nowruz is considered one of the most important cultural and historical traditions of these regions. Lighting a fire, wearing new clothes, holding a dance ceremony, and giving gifts to each other are some of the activities that are done in this celebration.

=== Cuisine ===
Diyarbakır's cuisine includes lamb dishes which use spices such as black pepper, sumac and coriander; rice, bulgur and butter. Local dishes include Meftune, lamb meat and vegetables with garlic and sumac, and Kaburga Dolması, baked lamb's ribs stuffed with rice, almonds and spices. Watermelons are grown locally and there is an annual Watermelon Festival.

== Main sights ==
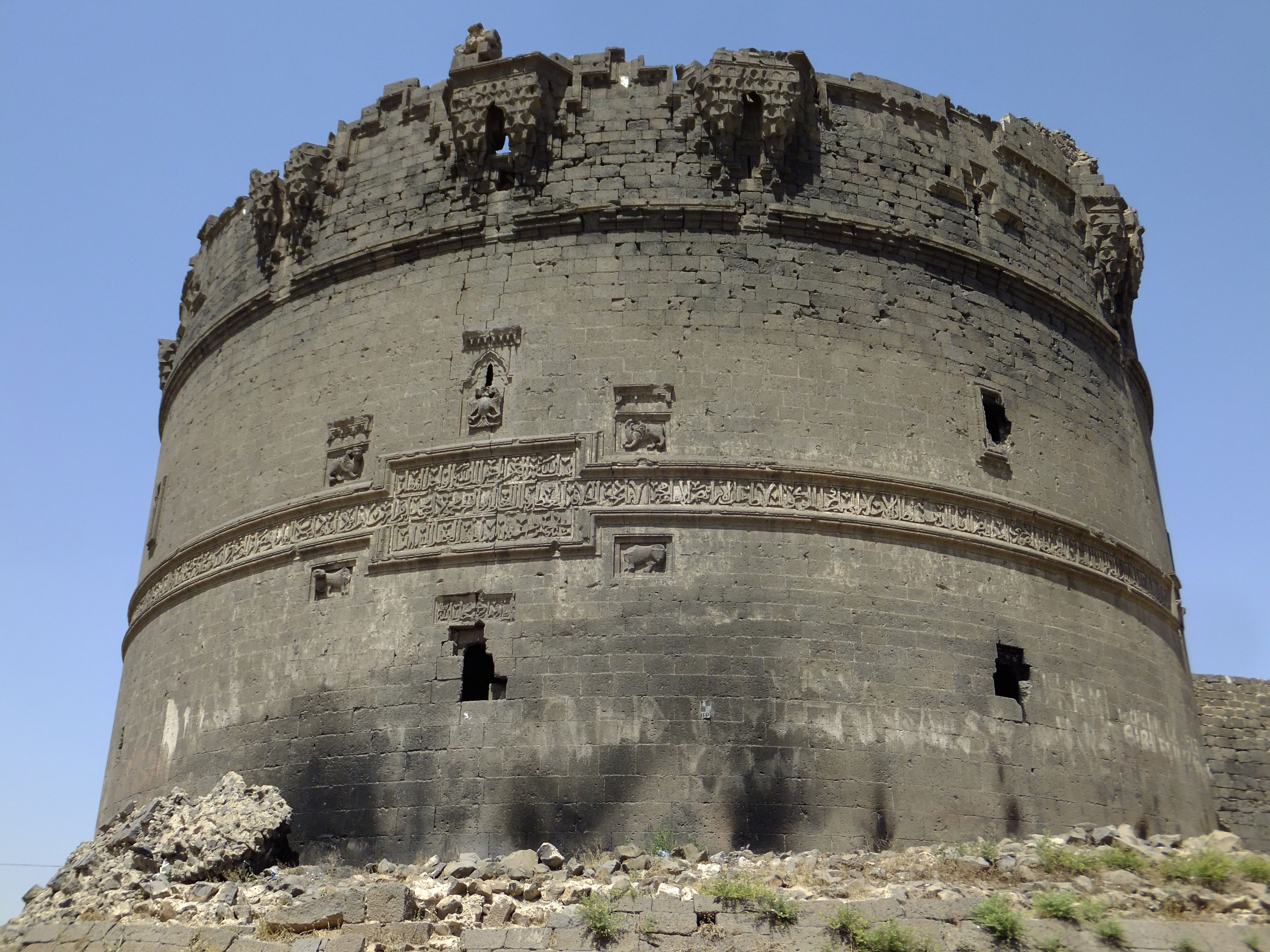
The Evli Beden or Ulu Beden Tower in the southern city walls, built in 1208 during the Artuqid period by Nasir al-Din Artuq Arslan.

The core of Diyarbakır is surrounded by an almost intact set of high walls of black basalt forming a 5.5 km (3.4 mi) circle around the old city. There are four gates into the old city and 82 watch-towers on the walls, which were built in antiquity and restored and extended by the Roman emperor Constantius II in 349. The area inside the walls is known as the Sur district; before its recent demolition and redevelopment this district had 599 registered historical buildings. Nearby is Karaca Dağ.

=== Medieval mosques and medreses ===
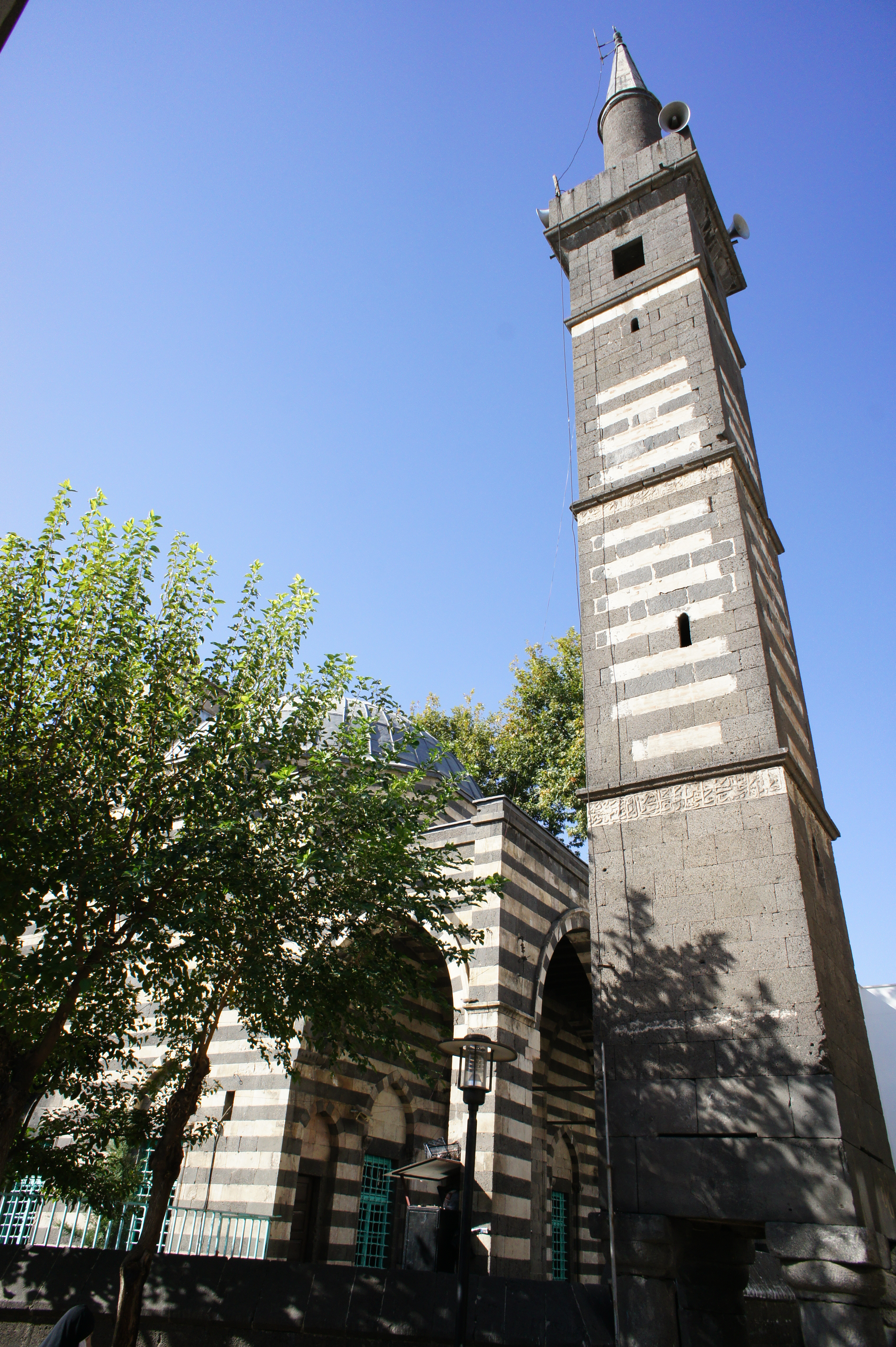
Sheikh Matar Mosque with its four-legged minaret

- Great Mosque of Diyarbakır built by the Seljuk Turkish Sultan Malik Shah in the 11th century. The mosque, one of the oldest in Turkey, is constructed in alternating bands of black basalt and white limestone (The same patterning is used in the 16th century Deliler Han Madrassah, which is now a hotel). The adjoining Mesudiye Medresesi/Medreseya Mesûdiyeyê was built at the same time, as was another prayer-school in the city, Zinciriye Medresesi/Medreseya Zincîriyeyê.
- Behram Pasha Mosque (Beharampaşa Camii/Mizgefta Behram Paşa) – an Ottoman mosque built in 1572 by the governor of Diyarbakır, Behram Pasha, noted for the well-constructed arches at the entrance.
- Sheikh Matar Mosque with Dört Ayaklı Minare/Mizgefta Çarling (the Four-legged Minaret) – built by Kasim Khan of the Aq Qoyunlu.
- Fatihpaşa Camii/Mizgefta Fetih Paşa – built in 1520 by Diyarbakır's first Ottoman governor, Bıyıklı Mehmet Paşa ("the moustachioed Mehmet pasha"). The city's earliest Ottoman building, it is decorated with fine tilework.
- Hazreti Süleyman Mosque/Mizgefta Hezretî Silêman (1155–1169) Süleyman son of Halid Bin Velid, who died capturing the city from the Arabs, is buried here along with his companions.
- Hüsrevpaşa Camii/Mizgefta Husrev Paşa – the mosque of the second Ottoman governor, 1512–1528. Originally the building was intended to be a school (medrese)
- İskender Paşa Camii/Mizgefta Îskender Paşa – a mosque of an Ottoman governor, in black and white stone, built in 1551.
- Melek Ahmet Camii/Melek Ahmed Paşa a 16th-century mosque with tiled prayer-niche and for the double stairway up the minaret.
- Nebii Camii/Mizgefta Pêxember – an Aq Qoyunlu mosque, a single-domed stone construction from the 16th century. Nebi Camii means "the mosque of the prophet" and is named for the inscriptions in honour of the prophet on its minaret.
- Safa Camii/Mizgefta Palo – built in the middle of the 15th century under Uzun Hasan, ruler of the Aq Qoyunlu (White Sheep Turkomans) tribe and restored in Ottoman time in 1532.

=== Churches ===
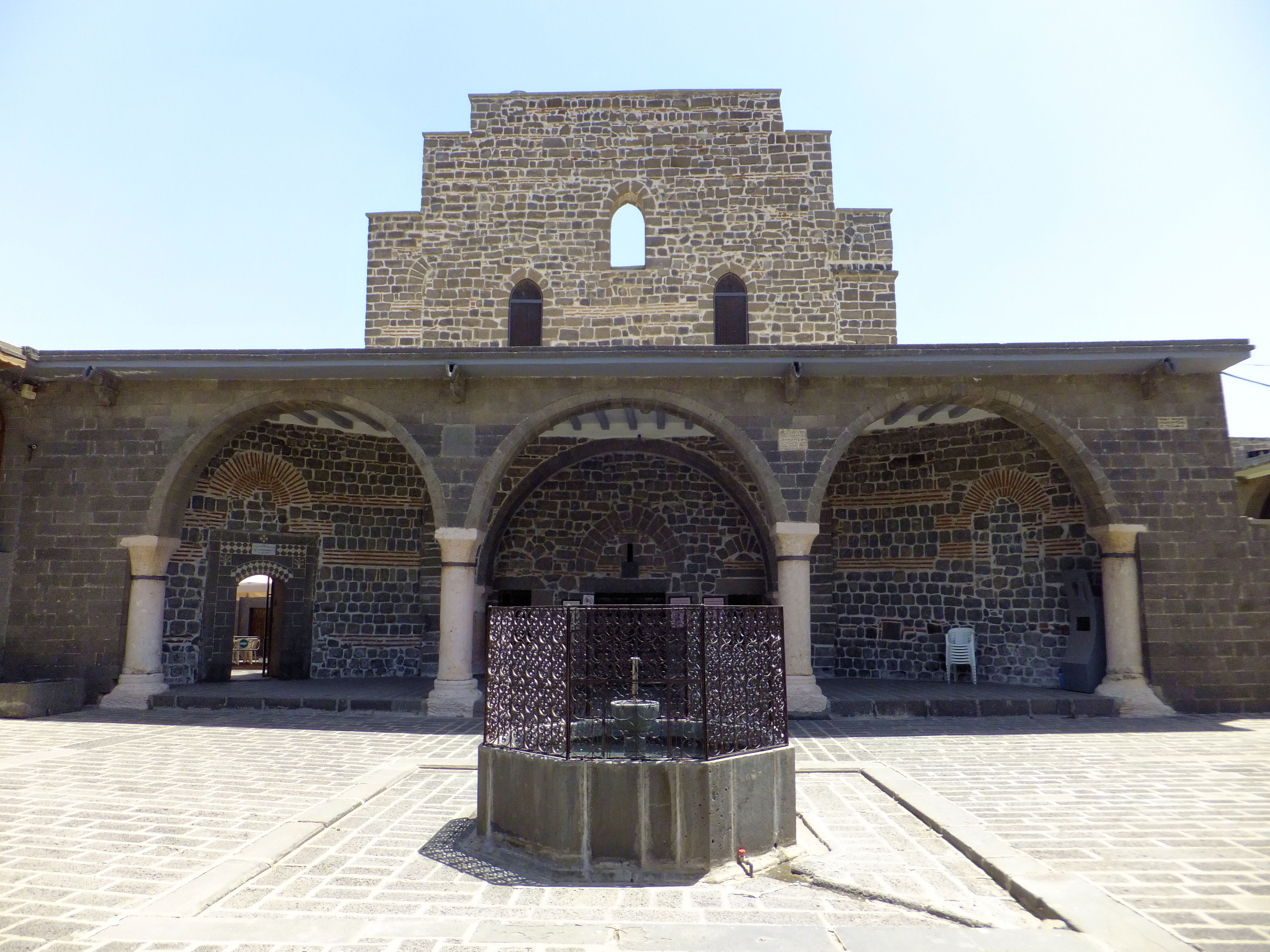
The Syriac Orthodox St. Mary Church, Diyarbakır

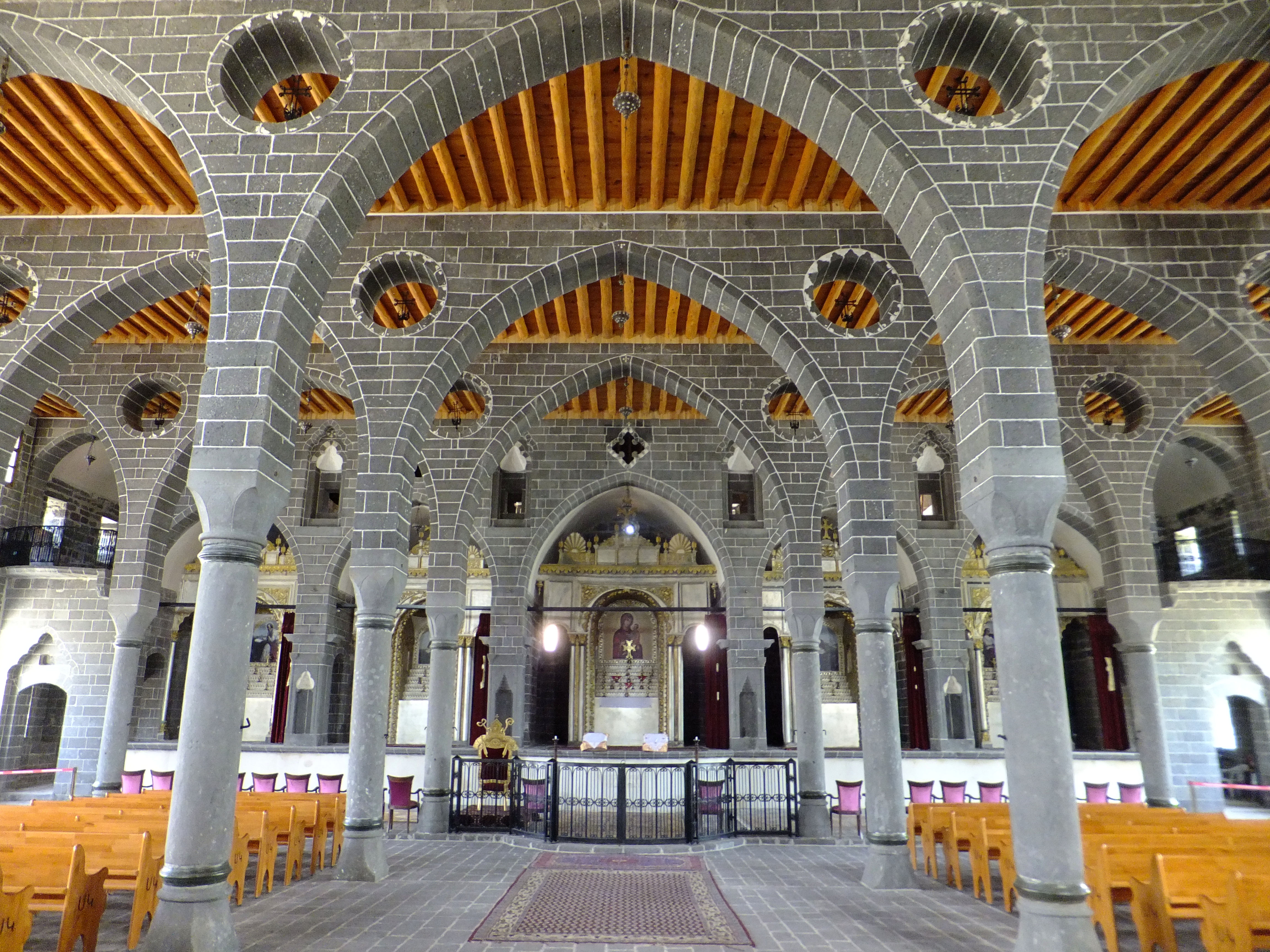
St. Giragos Armenian Church

- St. Giragos Armenian Church – first built in 1519, the current structure is from 1883, and was recently restored after a long period of disuse.
- The Syriac Orthodox Church of Our Lady (Syriac: ܐ ܕܝܠܕܬ ܐܠܗܐ `Idto d-Yoldat Aloho, Turkish: Meryemana kilisesi), was first constructed as a pagan temple in the 1st century BC. The current construction dates back to the 3rd century, has been restored many times, and is still in use as a place of worship today.
- Mar Petyun (St. Anthony) Chaldean Catholic Church, built in 1681.
- Surp Sarkis Chaldean Church
- St. Mary's Cathedral
- St. George's Church

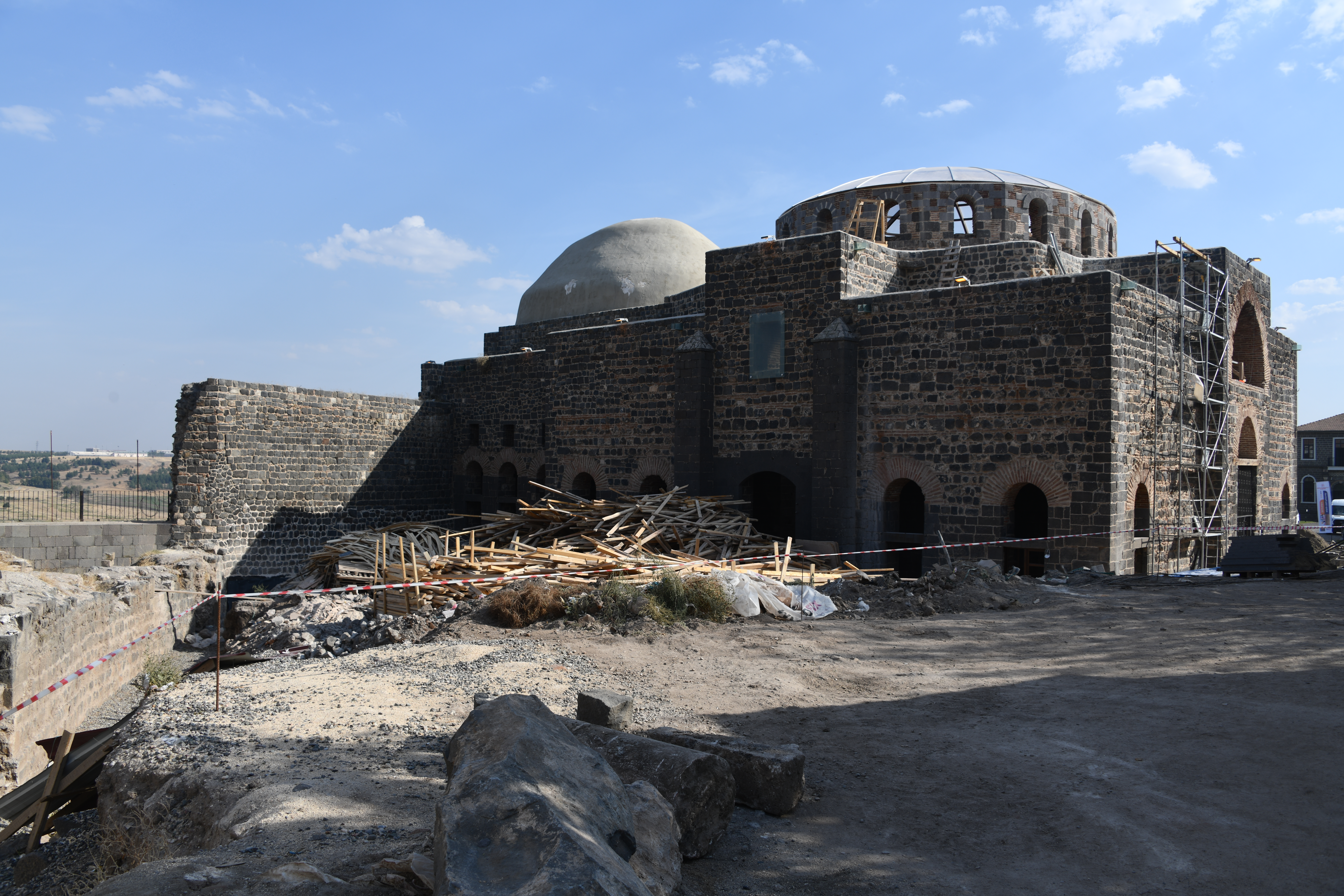
Church of St. George in İçkale during restoration in 2024

=== Museums ===
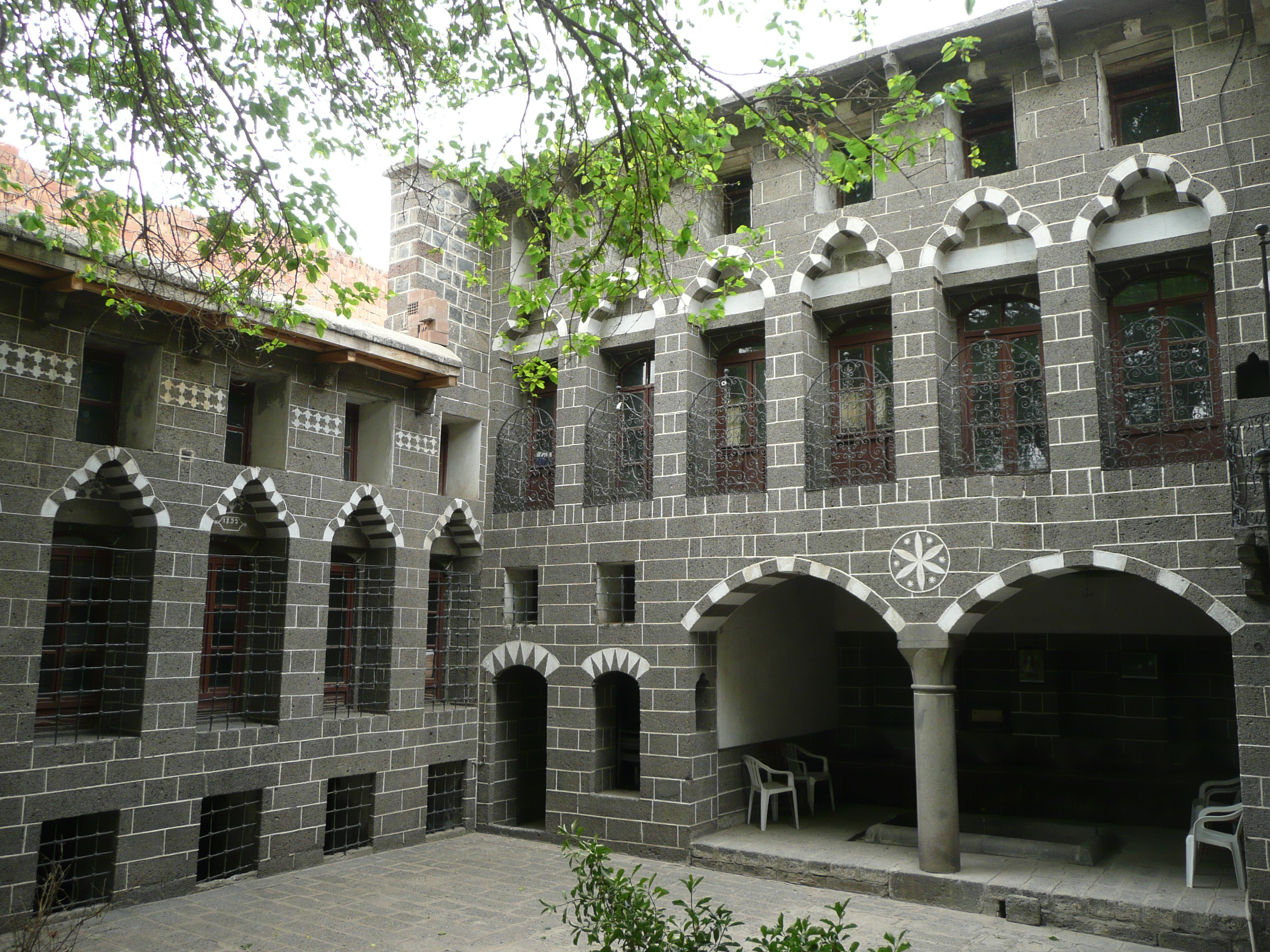
Interior of the Cahit Sıtkı Tarancı Museum, an example of Diyarbakır's historic domestic architecture, built in local dark basalt

- The Archaeological Museum contains artifacts from the Neolithic period, through the Early Bronze Age, Assyrian, Urartu, Roman, Byzantine, Artuqids, Seljuk Turk, Aq Qoyunlu, and Ottoman Empire periods.
- Cahit Sıtkı Tarancı Museum – the home of the late poet and a classic example of a traditional Diyarbakır home.
- Ziya Gökalp Museum – the birthplace of poet Ziya Gökalp, preserved as a museum to his life and works.
- Ahmet Arif Literature Museum Library

=== Other historical buildings ===
- The Diyarbakır Fortress and Hevsel Gardens Cultural Landscape, named a UNESCO World Heritage site in 2015.
- Hasan Pasha Han, a large 16th-century Ottoman caravanserai, now hosting shops and cafés.
- Delliler Han, a caravanserai built in 1527, now used as a five-star hotel.
- Sülüklü Han, built circa 1680, now a popular café and meeting spot.
- The Dicle Bridge, an 11th-century bridge with ten arches.
- Urfa Kapi, Urfa Kapi (Urfa Gate) is one of the four main gates built in the 4th century Byzantine era city walls of Diyarbakir that leads the road from the west to the town of Urfa.

== Climate ==
Diyarbakır has a Mediterranean (Köppen climate classification: Csa) or an anomalously warm, hot-summer oceanic climate (Trewartha climate classification: Doa). Summers are very hot and very dry, due to its location on the Mesopotamian plain which is subject to hot air masses from the deserts of Syria and Iraq to the south. The highest recorded temperature was 46.2 °C (112.64 °F) on 21 July 1937. Winters are chilly with moderate precipitation and frosty nights. Snowfall is quite common between the months of December and March, snowing for a week or two. The lowest recorded temperature was −24.2 °C (−10.12 °F) on 11 January 1933. Highest recorded snow depth was 65 cm (25.6 inches) on 16 January 1971.

Climate data for Diyarbakır (1991–2020, extremes 1929–2023)
Month	Jan	Feb	Mar	Apr	May	Jun	Jul	Aug	Sep	Oct	Nov	Dec	Year
Record high °C (°F)	16.9 (62.4)	21.8 (71.2)	28.3 (82.9)	35.3 (95.5)	39.8 (103.6)	42.0 (107.6)	46.2 (115.2)	45.9 (114.6)	42.2 (108.0)	35.7 (96.3)	28.4 (83.1)	22.5 (72.5)	46.2 (115.2)
Mean daily maximum °C (°F)	7.3 (45.1)	9.6 (49.3)	15.0 (59.0)	20.5 (68.9)	26.8 (80.2)	34.4 (93.9)	38.9 (102.0)	38.7 (101.7)	33.4 (92.1)	25.7 (78.3)	16.3 (61.3)	9.2 (48.6)	23.0 (73.4)
Daily mean °C (°F)	2.1 (35.8)	3.8 (38.8)	8.7 (47.7)	13.5 (56.3)	18.9 (66.0)	26.3 (79.3)	31.0 (87.8)	30.5 (86.9)	25.0 (77.0)	17.8 (64.0)	9.3 (48.7)	3.8 (38.8)	15.9 (60.6)
Mean daily minimum °C (°F)	−2.0 (28.4)	−1.1 (30.0)	2.6 (36.7)	6.6 (43.9)	10.9 (51.6)	16.8 (62.2)	21.7 (71.1)	21.2 (70.2)	15.9 (60.6)	10.4 (50.7)	3.8 (38.8)	−0.5 (31.1)	8.9 (48.0)
Record low °C (°F)	−24.2 (−11.6)	−21.0 (−5.8)	−14.0 (6.8)	−6.1 (21.0)	0.8 (33.4)	1.8 (35.2)	9.9 (49.8)	11.4 (52.5)	4.0 (39.2)	−1.8 (28.8)	−12.9 (8.8)	−23.4 (−10.1)	−24.2 (−11.6)
Average precipitation mm (inches)	63.6 (2.50)	66.8 (2.63)	67.5 (2.66)	63.1 (2.48)	50.0 (1.97)	10.8 (0.43)	1.0 (0.04)	0.4 (0.02)	8.4 (0.33)	37.3 (1.47)	54.3 (2.14)	75.3 (2.96)	498.5 (19.63)
Average precipitation days	10.93	11.27	11.13	11.6	9.47	2.9	0.4	0.23	1.37	5.83	7.43	11.33	83.9
Average snowy days	4.5	3.2	1.1	0	0	0	0	0	0	0	0.4	1.6	10.8
Average relative humidity (%)	76.4	71.8	66.4	65.1	57.3	34.4	25.2	24.7	30.6	47.7	64.7	76.5	53.3
Mean monthly sunshine hours	124.0	135.6	173.6	210.0	282.1	348.0	362.7	341.0	279.0	220.1	165.0	114.7	2,755.8
Mean daily sunshine hours	4.0	4.8	5.6	7.0	9.1	11.6	11.7	11.0	9.3	7.1	5.5	3.7	7.5
Source 1: Turkish State Meteorological Service
Source 2: NOAA (humidity, 1991–2020), Meteomanz(snow days 2000-2023)

== Notable people ==
- See Category:People from Diyarbakır
- Aëtius of Amida, (5th century to mid-6th century) a Greek medical writer and court physician at Constantinople.
- Ayşe Şan, one of the most legendary voices in contemporary Kurdish music
- Hakki Akdeniz, american restaurateur
- Abdülkadir Aksu, former interior minister
- Ahmed Arif, poet
- Pınar Ayhan, singer, Turkish representative at the Eurovision Song Contest 2000
- Mucahit Bilici, american Muslim sociologist,
- Gamze Cizreli, Turkish entrepreneur and businessperson
- Aziz Yıldırım, old President of Fenerbahçe S.K. sports club
- Cahit Sıtkı Tarancı, poet
- Cihan Haspolatlı, footballer for Galatasaray S.K.
- Ephraim of Amida, Chalcedonian Christian theologian, comes orientis (523–524; 526) and patriarch of Antioch (527–545).
- Gazi Yaşargil, medical scientist and neurosurgeon
- Hesenê Metê, writer
- Hovsep Pushman, Armenian-American painter
- Hikmet Çetin, former foreign minister and former NATO Senior Civilian Representative in Afghanistan
- Azad Zal poet, writer, journalist, translator and linguist of Kurdish origin.
- Leyla Zana, politician
- Yekta Uzunoglu, writer, physician, human rights fighter, translator and entrepreneur.
- Lokman Polat, writer
- Agop Handanyan, physician and writer
- Mehmed Emin Bozarslan, writer
- Kevork Malikyan, actor
- Naum Faiq, Assyrian writer and founding father of modern Assyrian nationalism
- Osman Baydemir: Kurdish politician
- Rupen Zartarian, Armenian writer
- Rojen Barnas, writer
- Songül Öden, actress
- Süleyman Nazif, poet
- Ziya Gökalp, sociologist and writer (the Ziyagökalp neighborhood of the city is named after him, as well as many streets and schools)
- Mıgırdiç Margosyan, writer
- Coşkun Sabah, musician
- Sayf al-Din al-Amidi, Islamic theologian and legal scholar of the Shafi'i school
- Zabelle C. Boyajian, Armenian painter and writer
- Çiğdem Toker, Turkish investigative journalist

== See also ==
- Diyarbakır (electoral district)
- Kitab-i Diyarbakriyya
- Bozulus
- Another Look at East and Southeast Turkey
- Nowruz
- Turkish Kurdistan

== Sources ==
- Faroqhi, Suraiya (2009). Frisch, Shelley (ed.). The Ottoman Empire: A Short History. Markus Wiener Publishers. ISBN 978-1-55876-449-1.
- Ahmady, Kameel (2009). Lim, Richard (ed.). Another Look at East and Southeast Turkey (in Turkish and English). Diyarbakir: GABB Publication. ISBN 978-605-60513-0-2.
