= Agop Handanyan =

Dr. Agop Handanyan (born 1834, Diyarbakir, Ottoman Empire - died October 30, 1899 Istanbul, Ottoman Empire) was a respected physician, writer, translator, professor, and author of the first forensic science book in Ottoman Turkey. He was of Armenian descent.

== Translations ==
Having known French very well, Agop Handanyan completed the important task of translating works of French medical books into Ottoman Turkish. He first translated books of Joseph Briand and Ernest Chaudé from the French into English in 1875. His then wrote the Tıbb-ı Kanunî in 1877, which was a translation from the French. This was followed by a toxicology study called Kimya-yi Kanunî in 1885. These books are considered the first medical books in Turkish history.
