= Hazreti Süleyman Mosque =

Mosque in Sur, Diyarbakır, Turkey

Coordinates: 37.9148967°N 40.2398629°E

- Hazreti Süleyman Camii; Mizgefta Hezretî Silêman
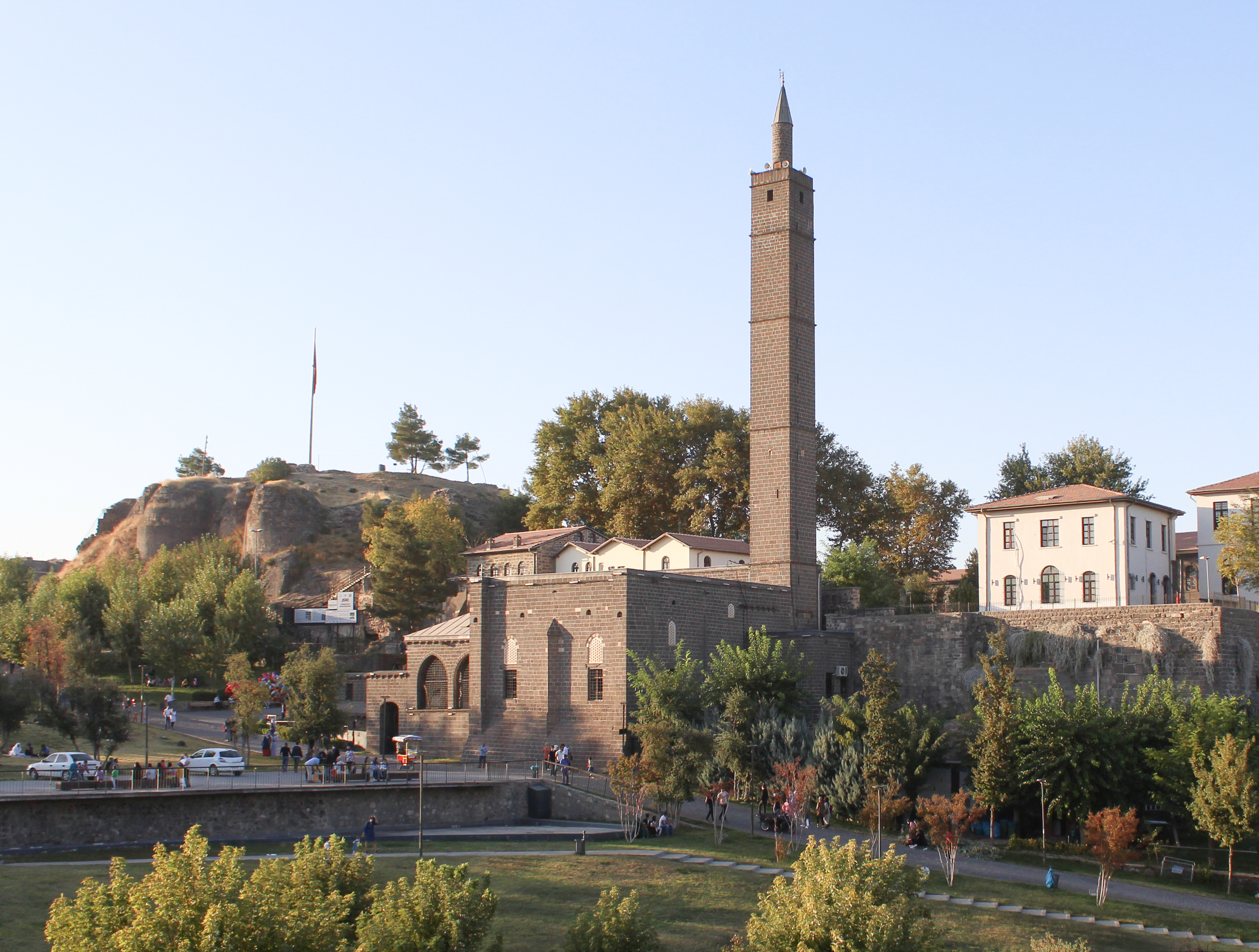

Religion
- Affiliation: Islam

Location
- Location: Diyarbakır, Turkey
- Interactive map of Hazreti Süleyman Mosque

Architecture
- Architect: Hibetullah Gürgani
- Type: Mosque
- Groundbreaking: 1155
- Completed: 1169; 857 years ago

Hazreti Süleyman Mosque (Turkish: Hazreti Süleyman Camii, Kurdish: Mizgefta Hezretî Silêman) is a mosque in Diyarbakır, Turkey.

The mostly ashlar structure was built between 1155 and 1169 by Nisanoğlu Ebul Kasim. The mosque is divided into three sections and has a square-based minaret, which has an inscription dated to 555 AH (1160 CE) according to the Islamic calendar. It contains the tombs of Süleyman, son of Khalid ibn al-Walid of the Bekir clan and his followers. The mosque was brought to its current state in 1631 by Silahdar Murtaza Pasha.

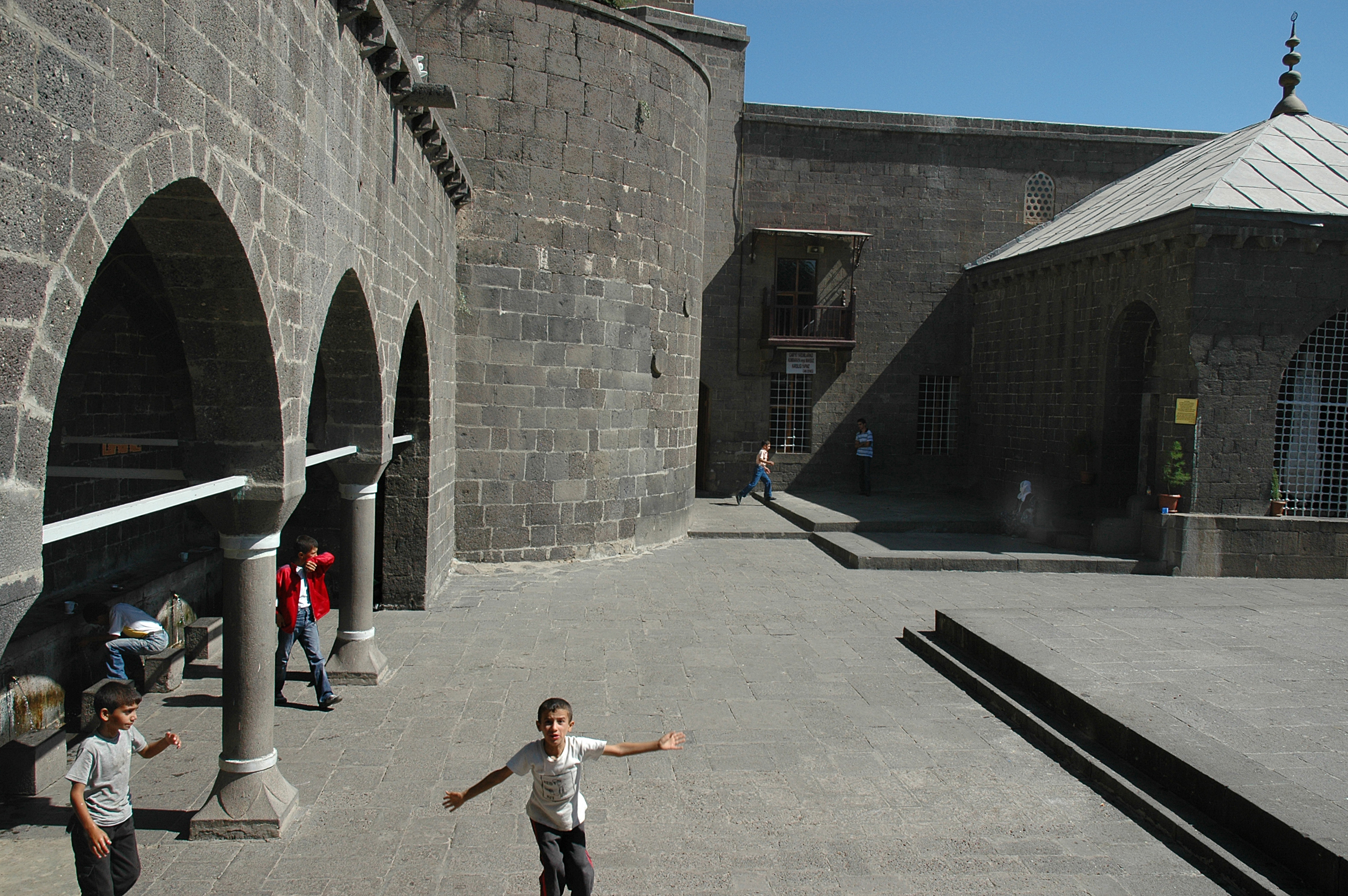
Diyarbakır Hazreti Süleyman Mosque Courtyard

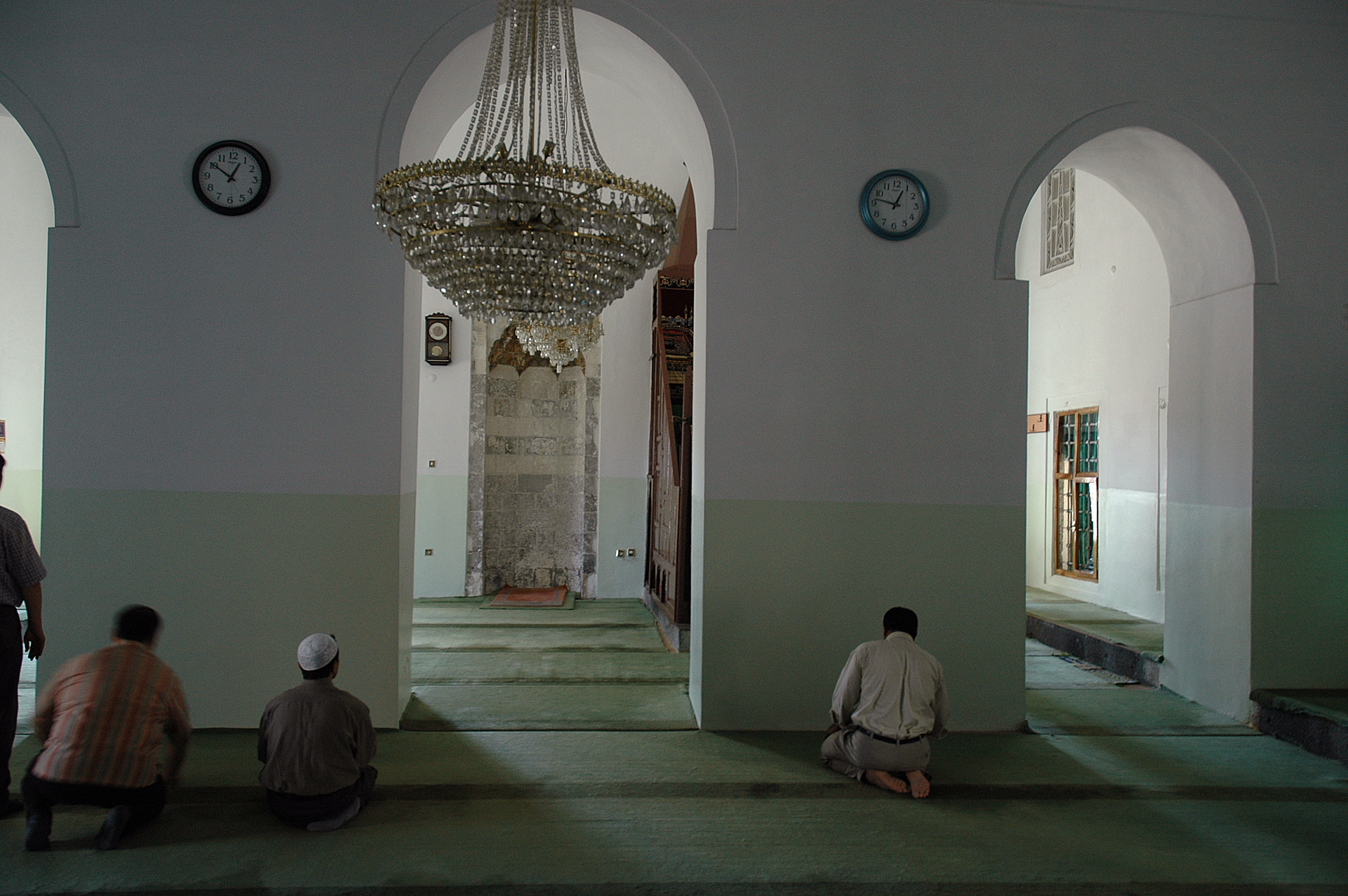
Diyarbakır Hazreti Süleyman Mosque Interior

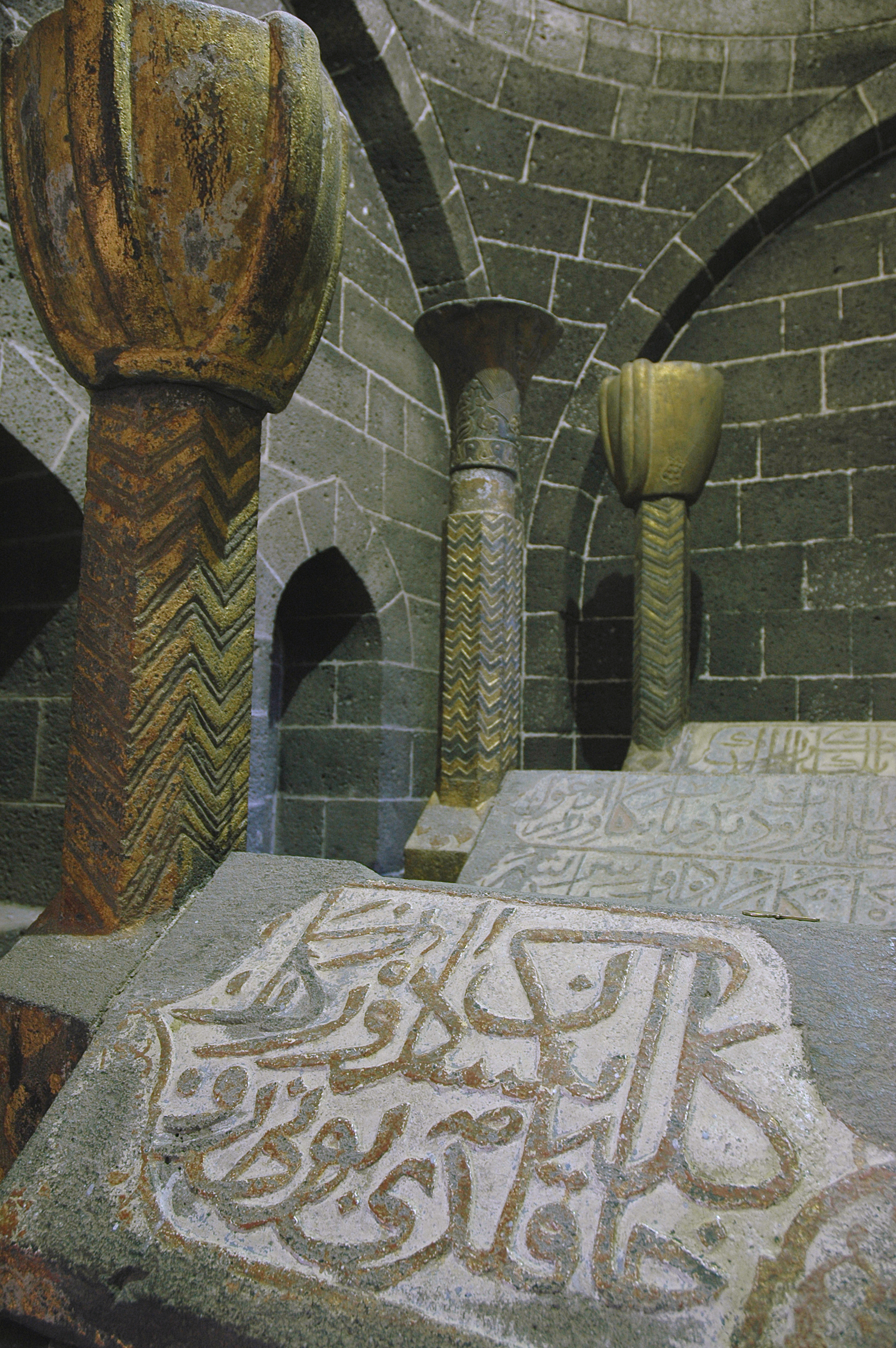
Diyarbakır Hazreti Süleyman Mosque Graves
