= Gamze Cizreli =

Turkish entrepreneur and businessperson (born 1968)

- Born: 1968 (age 57–58); Diyarbakir
- Citizenship: Turkey
- Education: Middle East Technical University
- Years active: 1994-present
- Known for: BigChefs
- Children: 2

Gamze Cizreli (b. 1968, Diyarbakır), is a Turkish entrepreneur and businessperson. She is the founder of BigChefs.

== Biography ==
Cizreli, who grew up in Ankara, studied Business Administration at Middle East Technical University, graduating in 1991. Changing sectors in 1994, Cizreli and her first husband founded Cafemiz on Argentina Street in Ankara. Afterwards, she founded Kuki, which provided pastry services and Quick China, which sold Far Eastern food. Cizreli went bankrupt in 2005. In 2007 took out a loan and established BigChefs in Ankara.

Tarifte Aşk Var, a movie about Cizreli's life, was released in 2018.
