= Dicle Bridge =

Bridge in Turkey

Dicle Bridge Dicle Köprüsü / Pira Dehderî
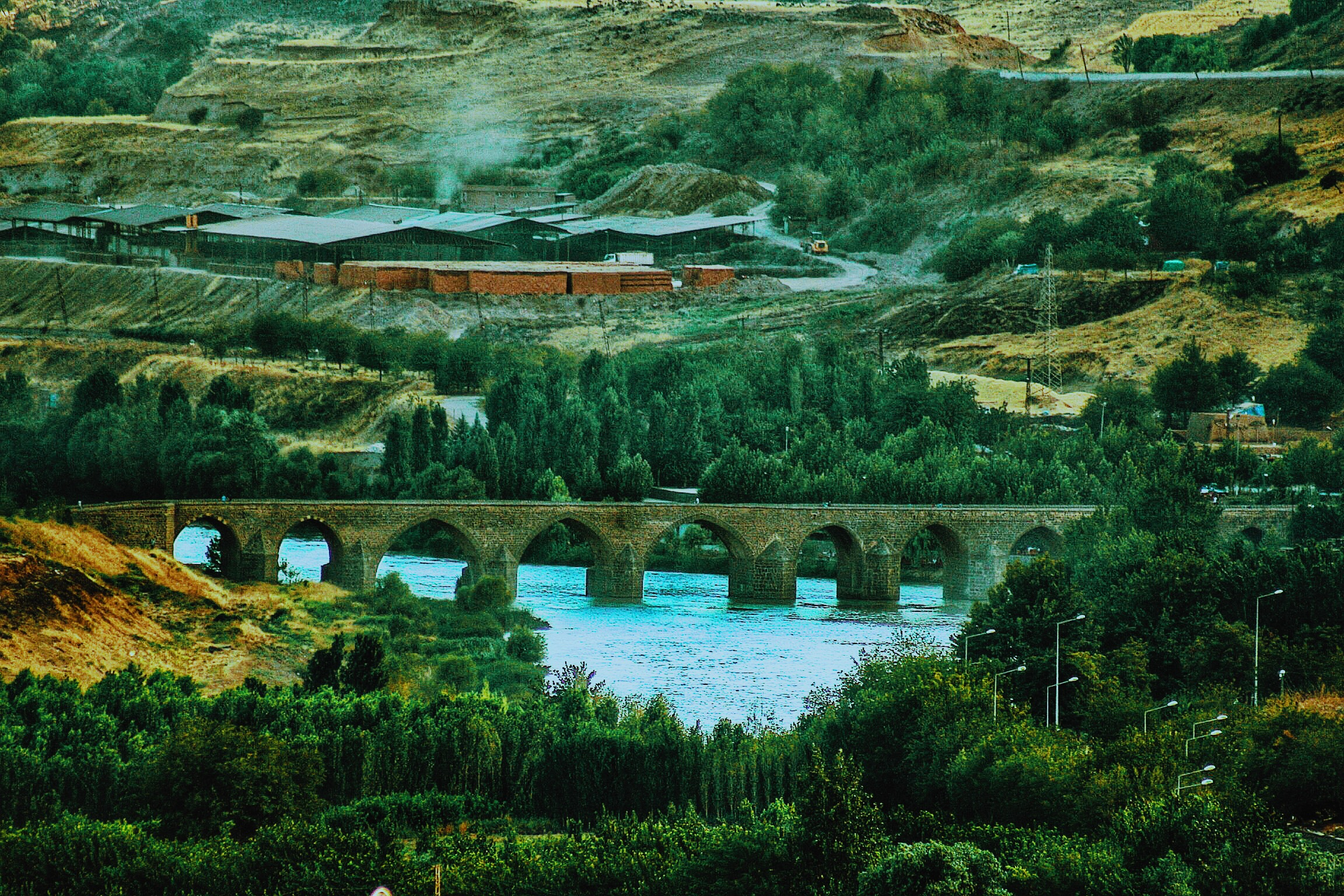
- Dicle Bridge in Diyarbakır
- Coordinates: 37.88719°N 40.22882°E
- Crosses: Tigris
- Other name(s): Silvan Bridge (Silvan Köprüsü / Pira Farqînê), Ten Arches Bridge (On Gözlü Köprü / Pira Dehderî)

Characteristics
- Material: Black volcanic stone
- Total length: 178 m (584 ft)
- Width: 5.60 m (18.4 ft)
- Longest span: 14.70 m (48.2 ft)
- No. of spans: 10

History
- Architect: Sancaroğlu Ubeydoğlu Yusuf
- Constructed by: Nizamüddin and Müeyyidüddevle
- Construction end: 1065

Location
- Interactive map of Dicle Bridge

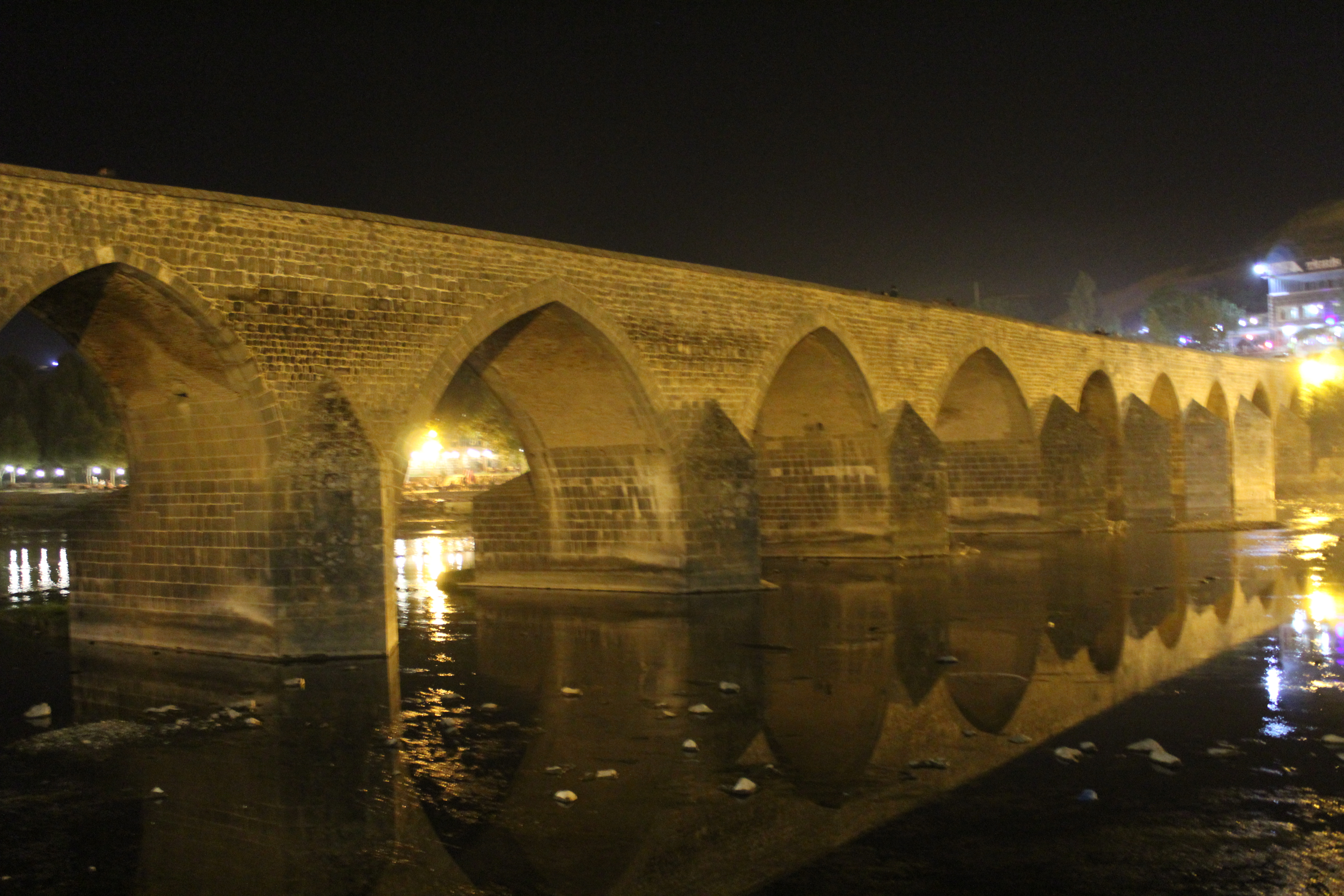
Diyarbakır Dicle Bridge night view

The Dicle Bridge (Turkish: Dicle Köprüsü; Kurdish: Pira Dehderî) is a historic bridge in Diyarbakır over the river Tigris (Turkish: Dicle) in southeastern Turkey. Completed in 1065, it numbers ten arches with a total length of 178 m (584 ft). Hence, it is locally called also "On Gözlü Köprü" / "Pira Dehderî" (literally: Ten Eyes Bridge). Its another name is the Silvan Bridge due to its position being on the road to Silvan.

The bridge was commissioned by Nizam al-Din and Muyyid al-Dawla during the Kurdish dynasty, Marwanids era (990–1085) in Diyarbakır, and was built by architect Yusuf son of Ubeyd son of Sandjar in 1065, as stated in two lines of Kufic script in the inscription mounted on the southern facade of the bridge.

The bridge is situated south of the city, 3 km (1.9 mi) outside of Mardinkapı/Deriyê Mêrdînê (literally: Mardin Gate). Its location is the nearest to the city considered the bends and the course of the river as well as the rate of water flow. Built with black volcanic stones, the bridge is 178 m (584 ft) long and 5.60 m (18.4 ft) wide, varying at some places on it. Longest span of the ten arches measures 14.70 m (48.2 ft).

Due to its historic characteristic, motorized traffic over the bridge suspended after the construction of the Marwanids Bridge (Turkish: Mervaniler Köprüsü; Kurdish: Pira Merwaniyan), or as initially named Bağıvar Bridge, in November 2009. The new bridge was built about 1 km (0.62 mi) south of Dicle Bridge, far enough not to spoil the landscape view of the old bridge.

== Gallery ==
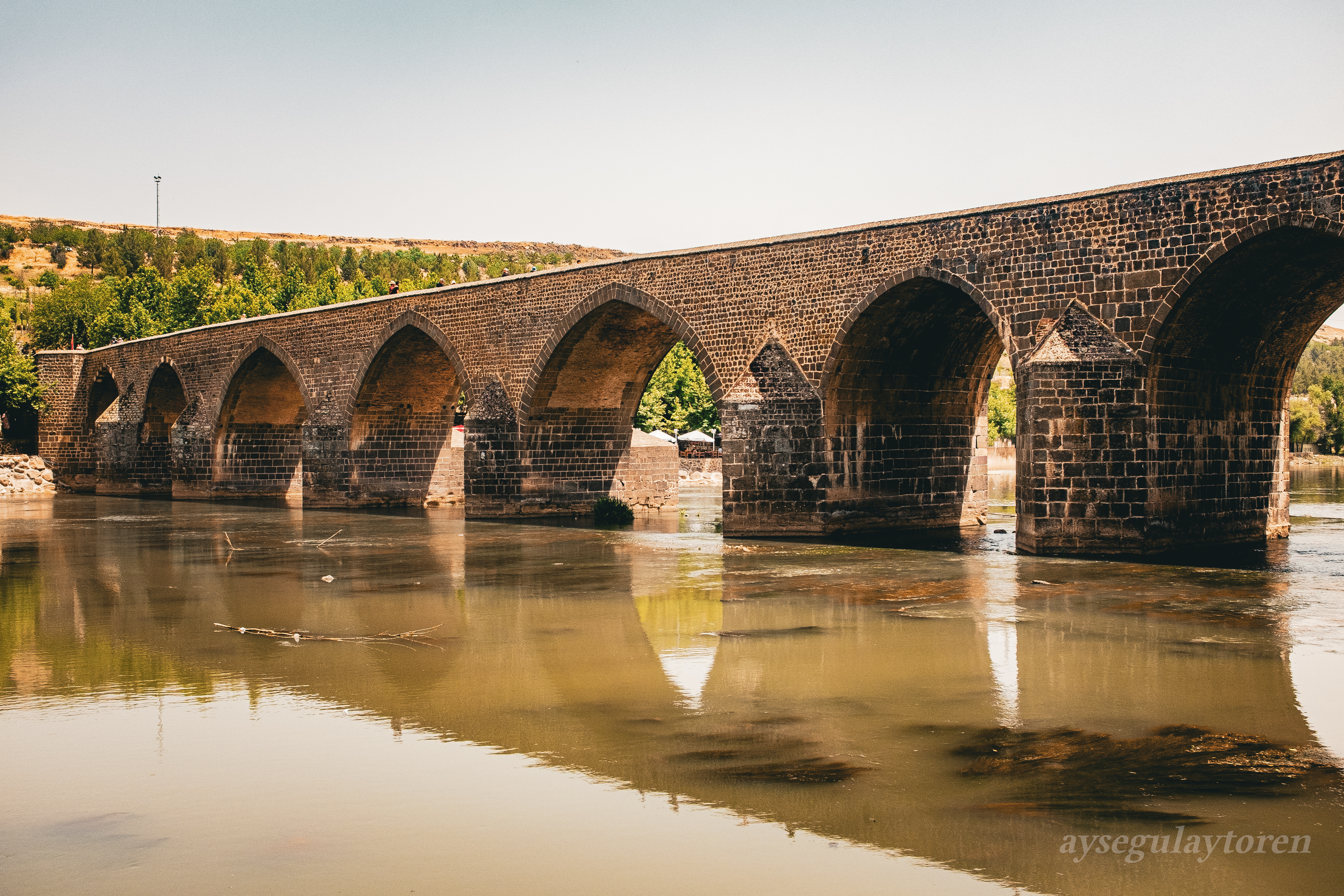
Amed - Diyarbakır historical ten-eyed bridge

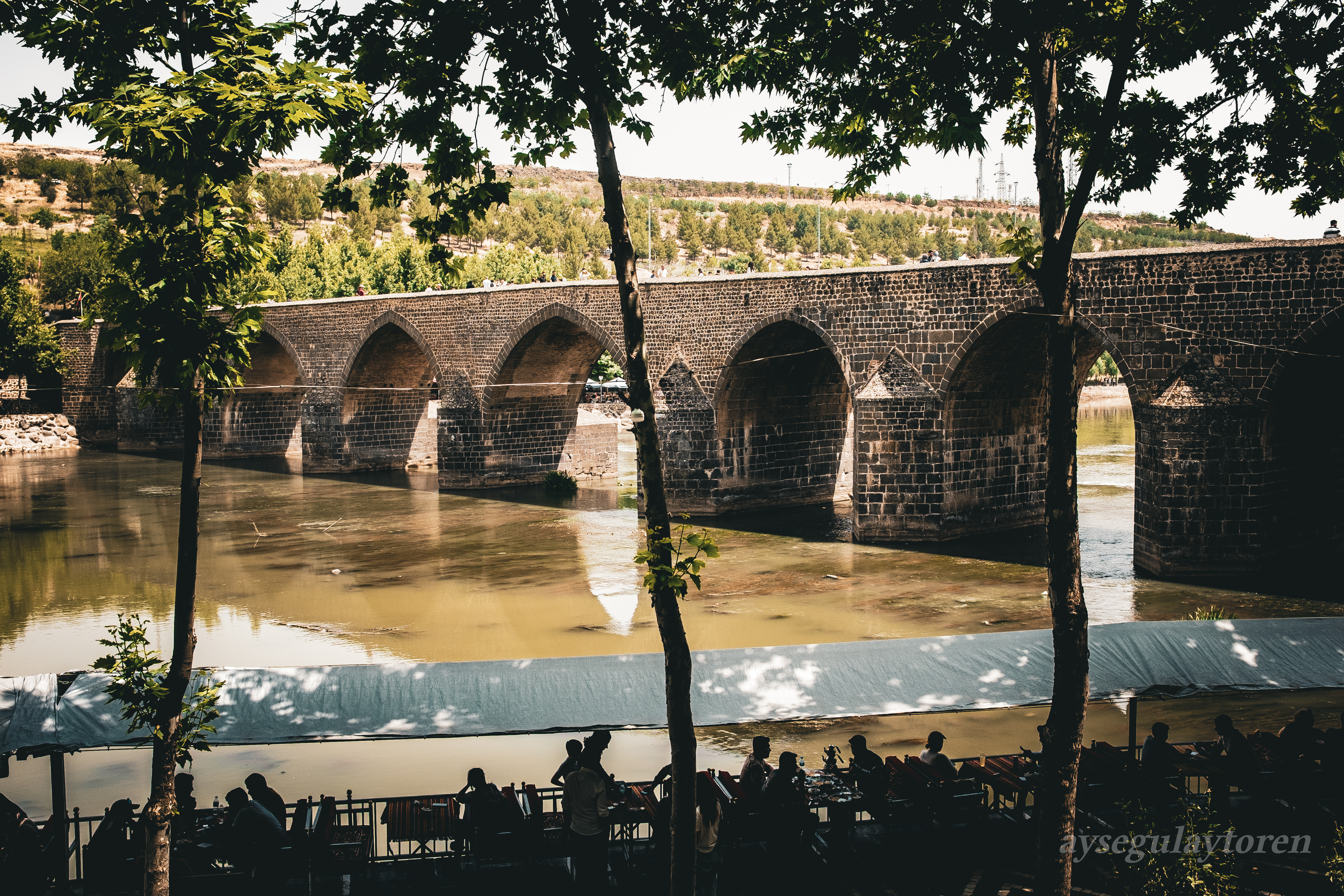
Diyarbakır historical ten-eyed bridge view from restaurant

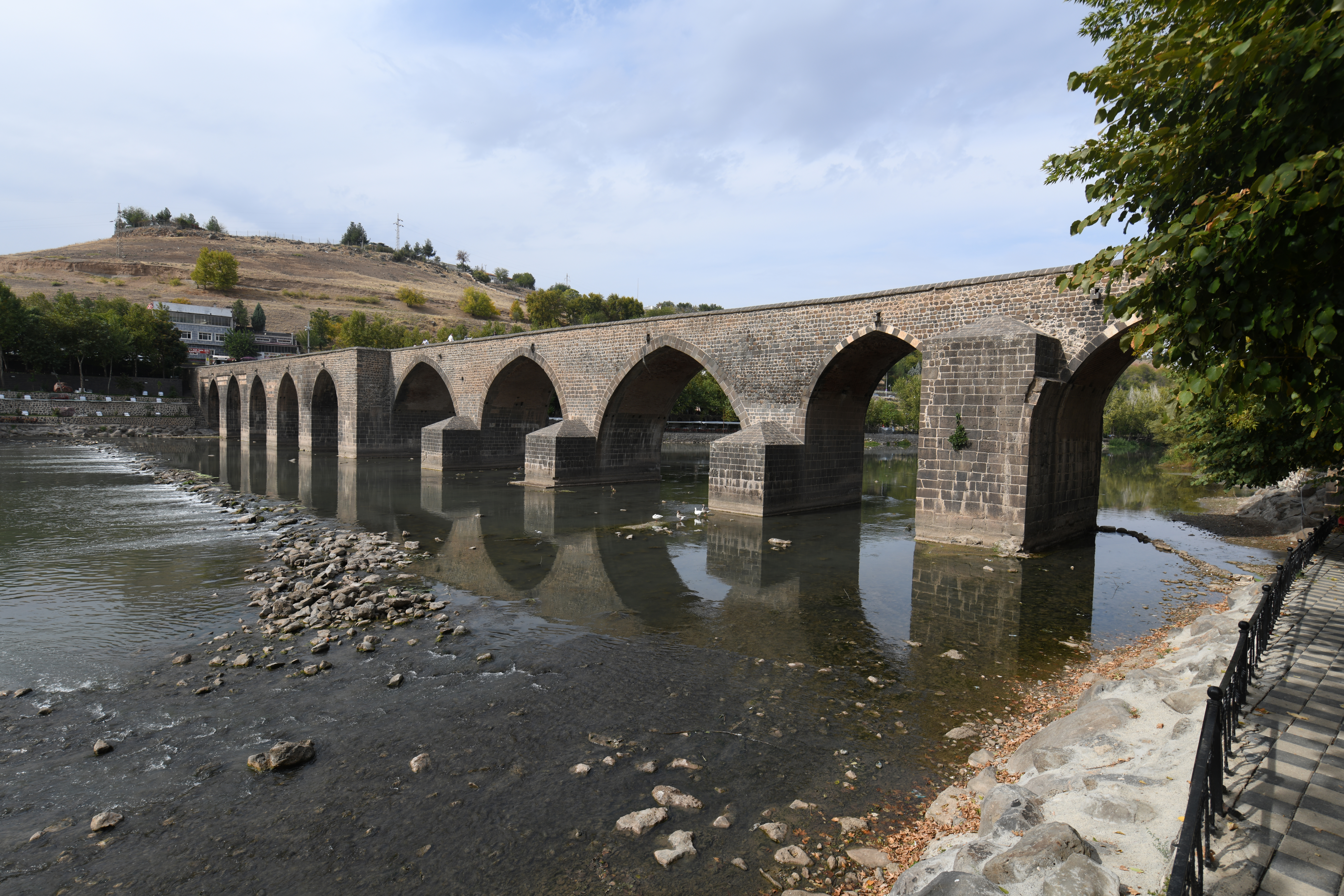
Ten-Arched Bridge View from southeast side

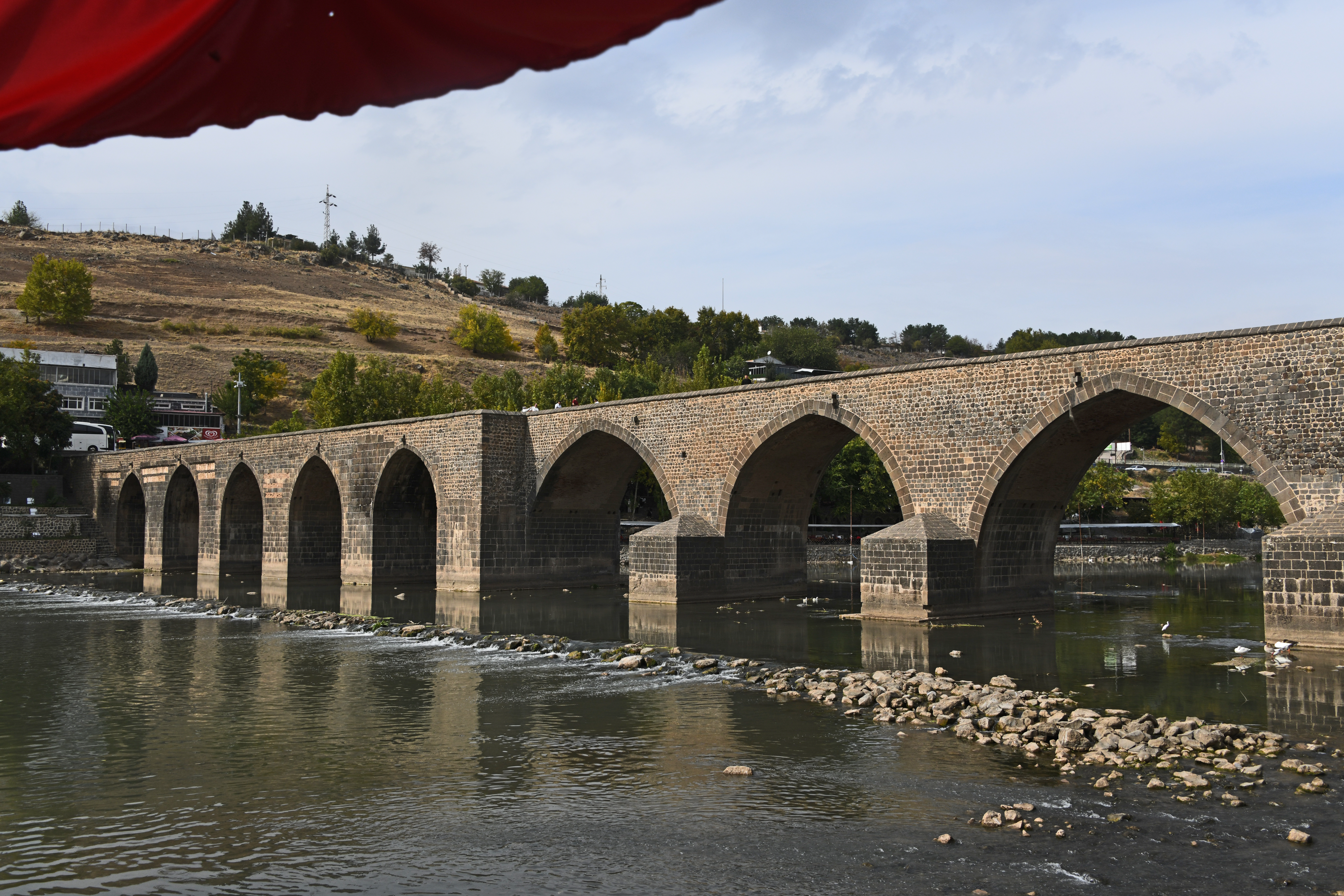
Ten-Arched Bridge View from southeast side of Tigris in 2025
