= Lokman Polat =

Swedish writer of Kurdish origin (born 1956)

Lokman Polat (born 1956 in Lice, Diyarbakır Province) is a Swedish writer of Kurdish origin. Before 1980, he was involved in publishing political commentaries and news. He has been arrested several times due to his activities in the field of Kurdish literature, and was sentenced to 10 years in prison in absentia. He moved to Sweden in 1984 and began writing short stories in Kurdish. Lokam Polat is a founding member of the Kurdish Writers Association (Komela Nivîskarên Kurd), a member of the international PEN and a member of the Writers' Union of Sweden.

== Works ==
He has published 14 books so far. Four of them are written in Turkish and the rest in Kurdish. His Kurdish books include three novels and seven short stories. He has also translated four children books into Kurdish. He has been involved in journalism too and has published a journal titled Helwest.

=== Books ===
1. Barbar kasirgasi : kisa öyküler, 129 pp., Heviya Gel Publishers, Stockholm, 1989. (in Turkish)
2. Evîn û Jiyan, 80 pp., Çanda Nûjen Publishers, Stockholm, 1992.
3. Torina Şêx Seîd, 112 pp., Hêvîva Gel Publishers, ISBN 91-630-1941-8, 1993.
4. Jin û zîndan, 79 pp., Çanda Nûjen Publishers, Stockholm, ISBN 91-972247-3-1, 1995.
5. Xwîn û hêstirê çavan, 117 pp., Çanda Nûjen Publishers, Stockholm, ISBN 91-972247-5-8, 1995.
6. Çîvanoka evînê, Translation of Samad Behrangi's work, 44 pp., Çanda Nûjen Publishers, Stockholm, ISBN 91-972247-8-2, 1995.
7. Evîndar (bi pêşgotina Mehmed Uzun), 100 pp., Çanda Nûjen Publishers, Stockholm, ISBN 91-972247-6-6, 1996.
8. Kurdistana sor, 58 pp., Çanda Nûjen Publishers, Stockholm, ISBN 91-972247-1-5, 1996.
9. Mêrxas : serpêhatiyên Kurdî, 100 pp., Çanda Nûjen Publishers, Stockholm, ISBN 91-972247-7-4, 1996.
10. Ji Nav Edebiyata Swêdê, 120 pp., Çanda Nûjen Publishers, Stockholm, ISBN 91-973141-0-2, 1997.
11. Kewa Marî, novel, 274 pp., Çanda Nûjen Publishers, Stockholm, ISBN 91-89224-01-9, 1999.
12. Fîlozof, novel, 163 pp., Helwest Publishers, 2002.
13. Rojnamevan, novel, 109 pp., Pêrî Publishers, 2002.
