= Kangrali =

Kangrali may refer to the following towns in Belgaum district, Karnataka, India:

- Kangrali (BK)
- Kangrali (KH)

== See also ==
- Kangarli (disambiguation)
