= Kangarli =

Kangarli, or variants, may refer to:

== Places ==
- Kangarli District, Nakhchivan, Azerbaijan, named after the Kangarli tribe
  - Maku Khanate, or Kangarli Khanate, that once ruled the area
- Kəngərli, Agdam, Azerbaijan
- Kəngərli, Tartar, Azerbaijan
- Kengerli, Kızıltepe, Mardin Province, Turkey
- Kengerli, Sur, Diyarbakır Province, Turkey

== People ==
- Abbas Qoli Khan Kangarli (died 1810), ruler of the Nakhichevan Khanate in Afsharid Iran
- Bahruz Kangarli (1892–1922), Azerbaijani artist
- Haji Khan Kangarli (1765—1769), second khan of the Nakhichevan Khanate
- Karim Khan Kangarli, last khan of the Nakhichevan khanate
- Mahammad Kangarli, Azerbaijani doctor

== See also ==
- Kangrali (disambiguation)
- Kangarlu (disambiguation)
- Bala Kəngərli (disambiguation)
