= Karabaş =

Karabaş may refer to:

- Kangal Shepherd Dog
- Karabaş, Sur, a village in Turkey
