= Kangars =

Kangars may refer to one of the following.

- A character from Lāčplēsis Latvian epic
- Chris Kangars, an Australian rules footballer
- Kangar people, Kangars, an ancient Turkic tribe

== See also ==
- Kangar
- Kangarli (disambiguation)
