= Mermer =

Mermer may refer to:

Persons

- Mermer Blakeslee, American novelist
- Sami Mermer, Turkish-Kurdish-Canadian film director

Places

- Mermer, Sur
