= Bala Kəngərli =

Bala Kəngərli or Bala Kengerli or Bala-Kengerly may refer to:

- Bala Kəngərli, Kurdamir, village and municipality in the Kurdamir Rayon of Azerbaijan
- Bala Kəngərli, Tartar, village and municipality in the Tartar Rayon of Azerbaijan
