= Sağdıçlı =

Sağdıçlı can refer to:

- Sağdıçlı, Sur
- Sağdıçlı, Yüreğir
