= Arpaderesi =

Arpaderesi can refer to:

- Arpaderesi, Sur
- Arpaderesi, Taşova
