= Sayarlar, Sur =

Village in Turkey

Sayarlar
- Neighbourhood
- Location in Turkey
- Coordinates: 38°05′N 40°31′E
- Country: Turkey
- Province: Diyarbakır
- District: Sur
- Population (2022): 285
- Time zone: UTC+3 (TRT)

Sayarlar is a neighbourhood in the municipality and district of Sur, Diyarbakır Province in Turkey. Its population is 285 (2022).
