= Yenievler, Sur =

Village in Turkey

Yenievler
- Neighbourhood
- Location in Turkey
- Coordinates: 37°55′N 40°29′E
- Country: Turkey
- Province: Diyarbakır
- District: Sur
- Population (2022): 904
- Time zone: UTC+3 (TRT)

Yenievler is a neighbourhood in the municipality and district of Sur, Diyarbakır Province in Turkey. Its population is 904 (2022).
