= Alcık, Sur =

Village in Turkey

Alcık
- Neighbourhood
- Location within Turkey
- Coordinates: 38°11′N 40°17′E
- Country: Turkey
- Province: Diyarbakır
- District: Sur
- Population (2022): 643
- Time zone: UTC+3 (TRT)

Alcık (Kurdish: Fedilan) is a neighbourhood in the municipality and district of Sur, Diyarbakır Province in Turkey. Its population is 643 (2022).
