= St. Giragos Armenian Church =

Armenian Apostolic church in Diyarbakır, Turkey

Coordinates: 37°54′39″N 40°14′20″E

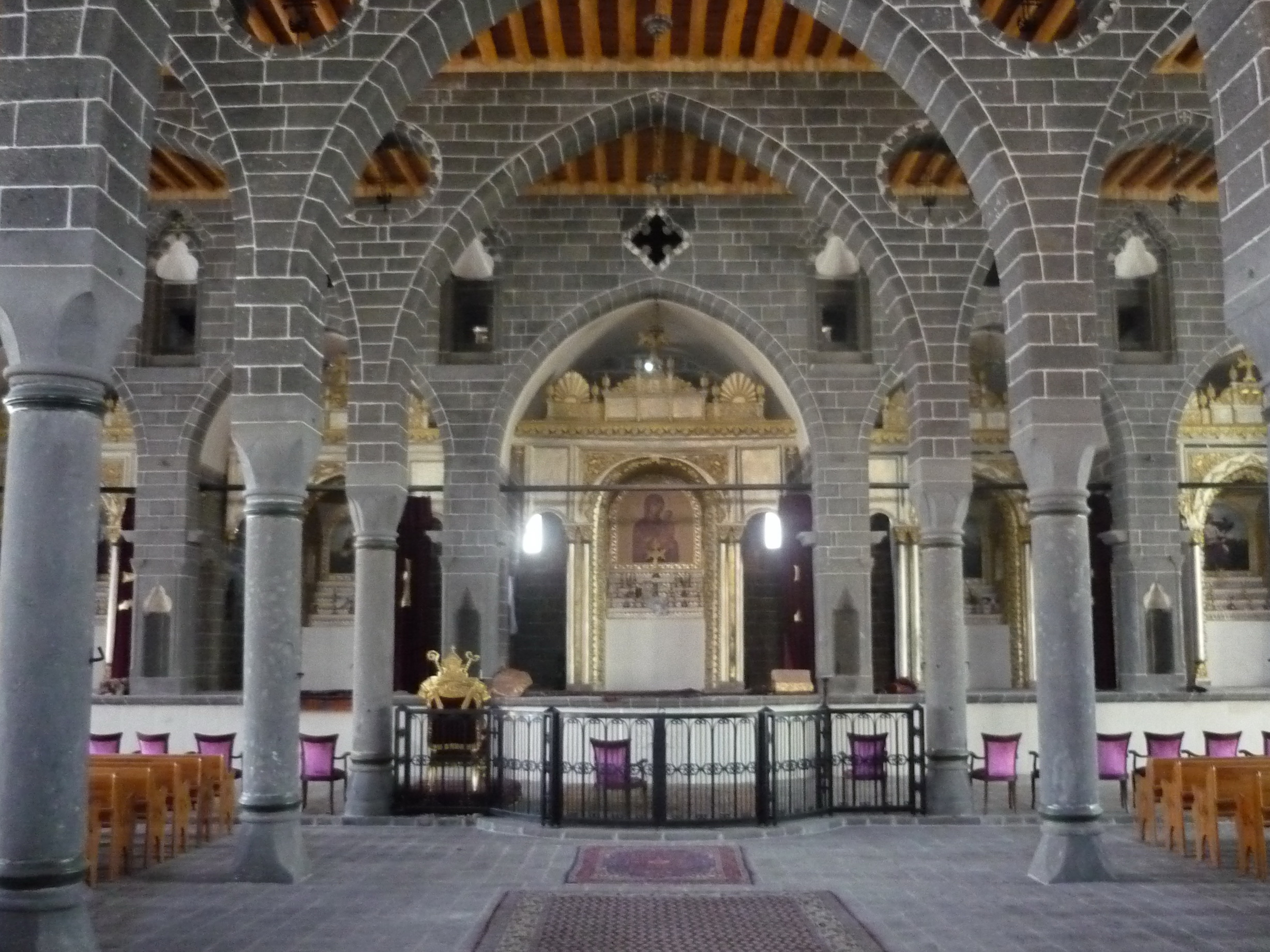
Interior of the church in 2012, after restoration

The Church of St. Giragos (Saint Cyricus) or Surp Giragos Church is a historic Armenian Apostolic church in Diyarbakır, Turkey. It is the largest Armenian church in the Middle East. The church was confiscated by the Turkish government in 2016. The church was re-opened to the public on May 7, 2022, after renovations.

== History ==
=== Construction and reconstructions ===
The existence of the church dates as far back as 1515-1518. The building was restored and expanded over the course of the 17th and 18th centuries, before it was destroyed by a devastating fire in 1880. It was rebuilt in its current form in 1883. Its current hypostyle architectural form was a deviation from traditional Armenian church architecture, but it resembled the format of the nearby Armenian Catholic Church in Diyarbakir and of other churches and mosques in the area. The bell tower of the church was struck by lightning in 1913 and rebuilt that year. When finished, the new bell tower was the tallest structure in the city, which became a point of contention with the local Muslim community, as it was taller than the minarets of any local mosques.

=== 20th century ===
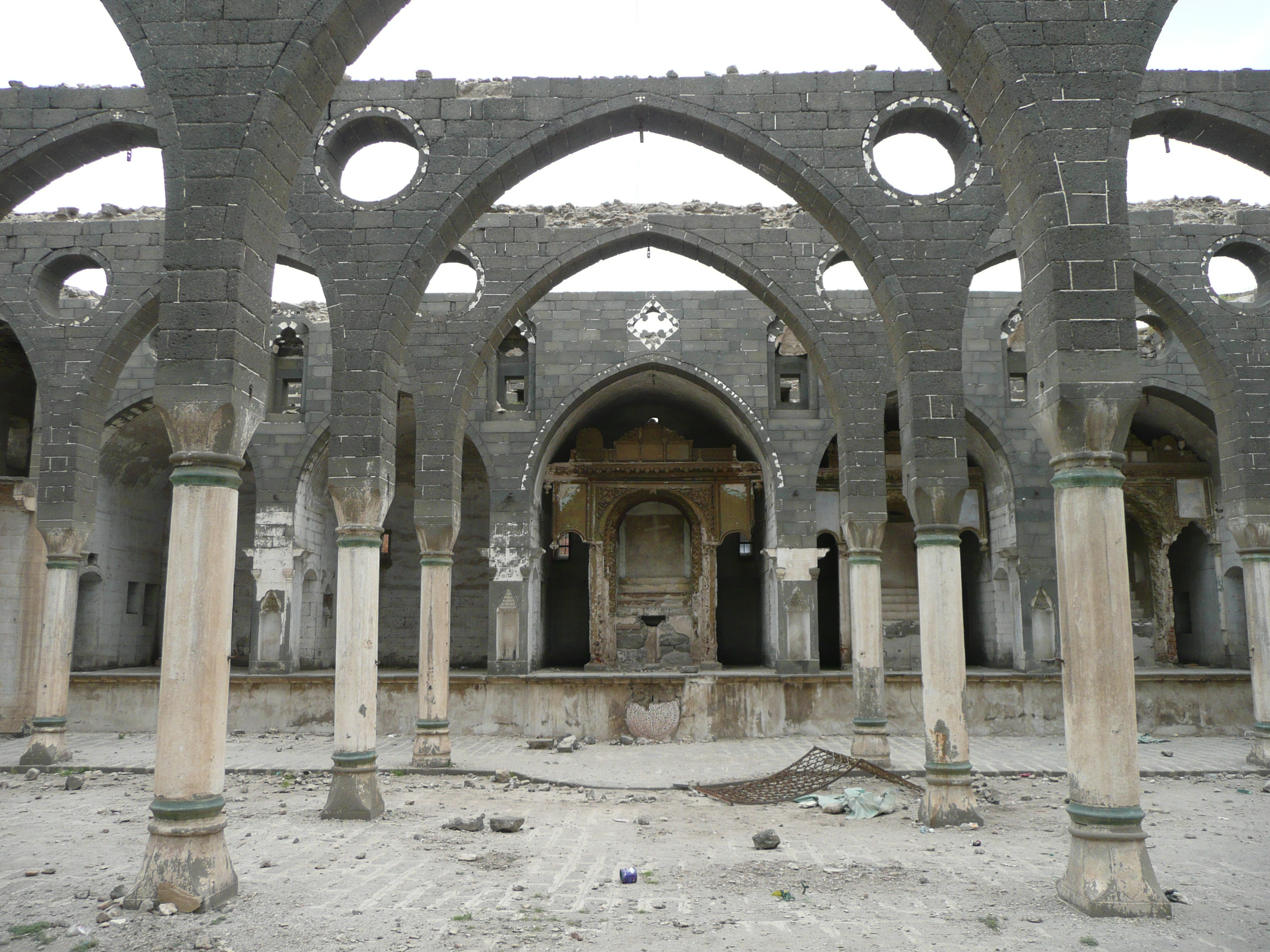
The church as seen in 2008, before restoration

During World War I, the church was used as a headquarters of the Imperial German Army. In 1915, during the Armenian genocide, the Christian population of the city was massacred. During the violence, artillery fire destroyed the bell tower of the church. After the war, the church was used as an army barracks, a warehouse, and as a textile factory by the state. In 1960, it was returned to the care of the remaining local Armenian community, but it remained in a derelict state. From 1915 to 2011, no official religious service was held in the church. In the 1990s severe snowstorms caused the roof to collapse, leaving the interior open to the elements.

=== Renovation and expropriation ===
In the 2000s, it was renovated in part as a sign of reconciliation by local leaders with the Christian community. The restoration process began in 2009 with the creation of the Surp Giragos Armenian Church Foundation, formed by Armenians residents in Istanbul, which oversaw the management and funding of the project. Financial support came from the international Armenian diaspora and from the local political authorities in Diyarbakir. The church was reopened on 23 October 2011 as "Turkey’s first church to be revived as a permanent place of worship". The church was reconsecrated on this occasion by Armenian Archbishop Aram Ateşyan. In 2013 the church was attracting hundreds of people per day; according to Gafur Turkay of the Surp Giragos Foundation, "Many of them are Islamised Armenians like me."

The historic district where the church is located, Sur, was heavily damaged during clashes between the Kurdistan Workers' Party and the Turkish Armed Forces in February 2016. The church itself survived relatively undamaged, though the nearby Armenian Catholic Church was partially destroyed. On 26 March 2016 the Turkish government confiscated St. Giragos in the area under Article 27 of the Expropriation Law. Neighbouring Syriac, Chaldean and Protestant churches were also expropriated as part of the same decision, which comprised the expropriation of some 6,300 plots of land in Diyarbakir's Sur (walled town) district, about 80% of the property in that district. The Diyarbakir Bar Association released a statement saying "this decision violates the property right and is also against Turkish Constitutional Law, Expropriation Law, and European Convention on Human Rights". The church was re-opened to the public on May 7, 2022, after renovations costing about 30 million Turkish Liras (around 2 million dollars at the time).

== Architecture ==
The church is the largest Armenian church in the Middle East. It is estimated that it could contain around 3000 worshippers. Its rectangular floor plan measures around 31 meters long and 35 meters wide. Inside, the church has a hypostyle form with a flat roof supported by three rows of arches that divide the space into four transverse "naves". In total, 20 arches are supported by 16 monolithic columns. Further inside was a second floor that was used by women. The church is unique in having seven altars: five on the ground floor along the eastern wall and two more on the second floor. On the exterior, the church is fronted by an arched portico and a bell tower. The church is also adjoined by a Patriarchate building, residence, wells, and three courtyards which are all part of the compound.

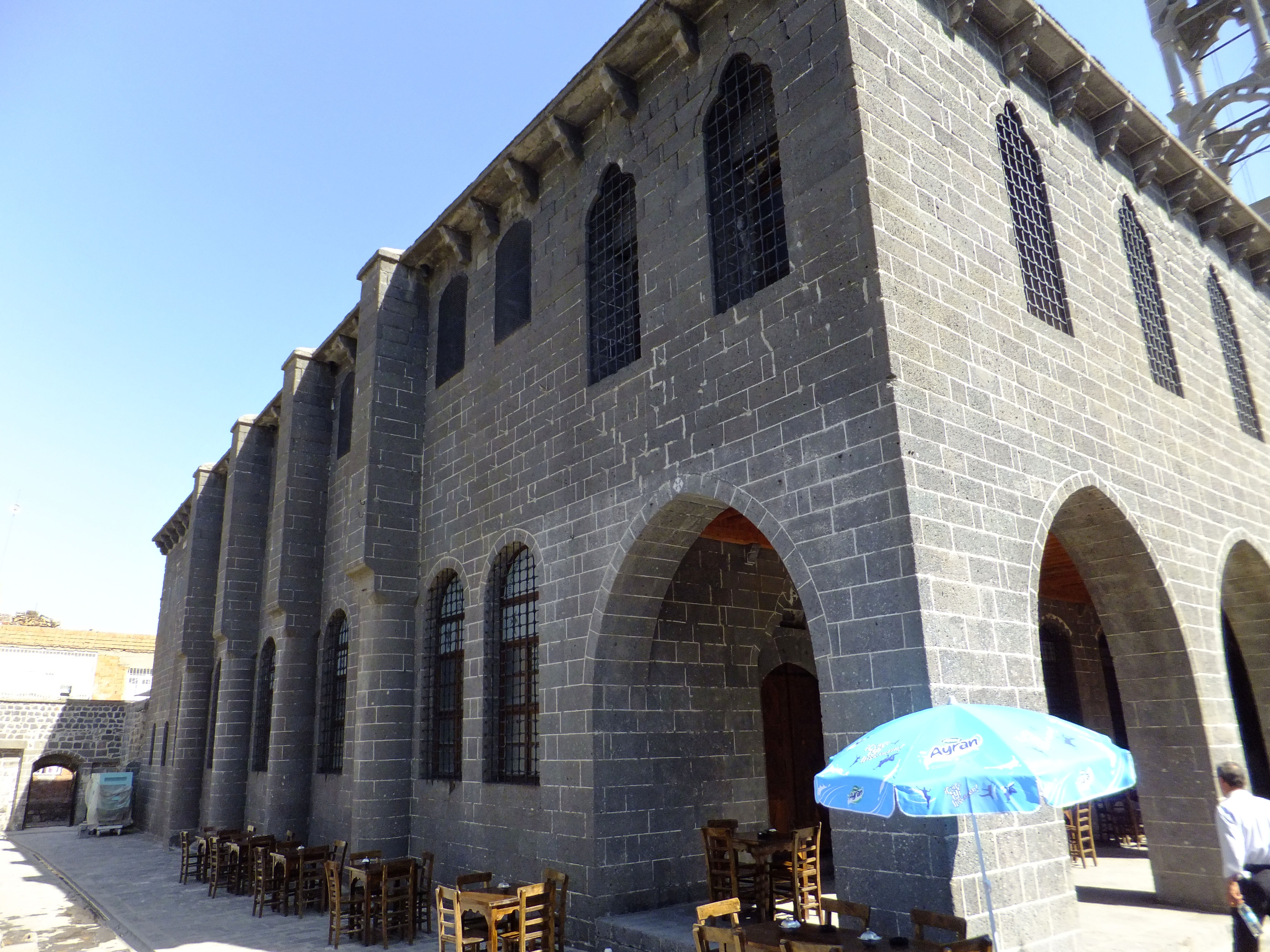
Exterior of the church: the north flank of the building is on the left and the frontal western façade, with a portico, begins on the right

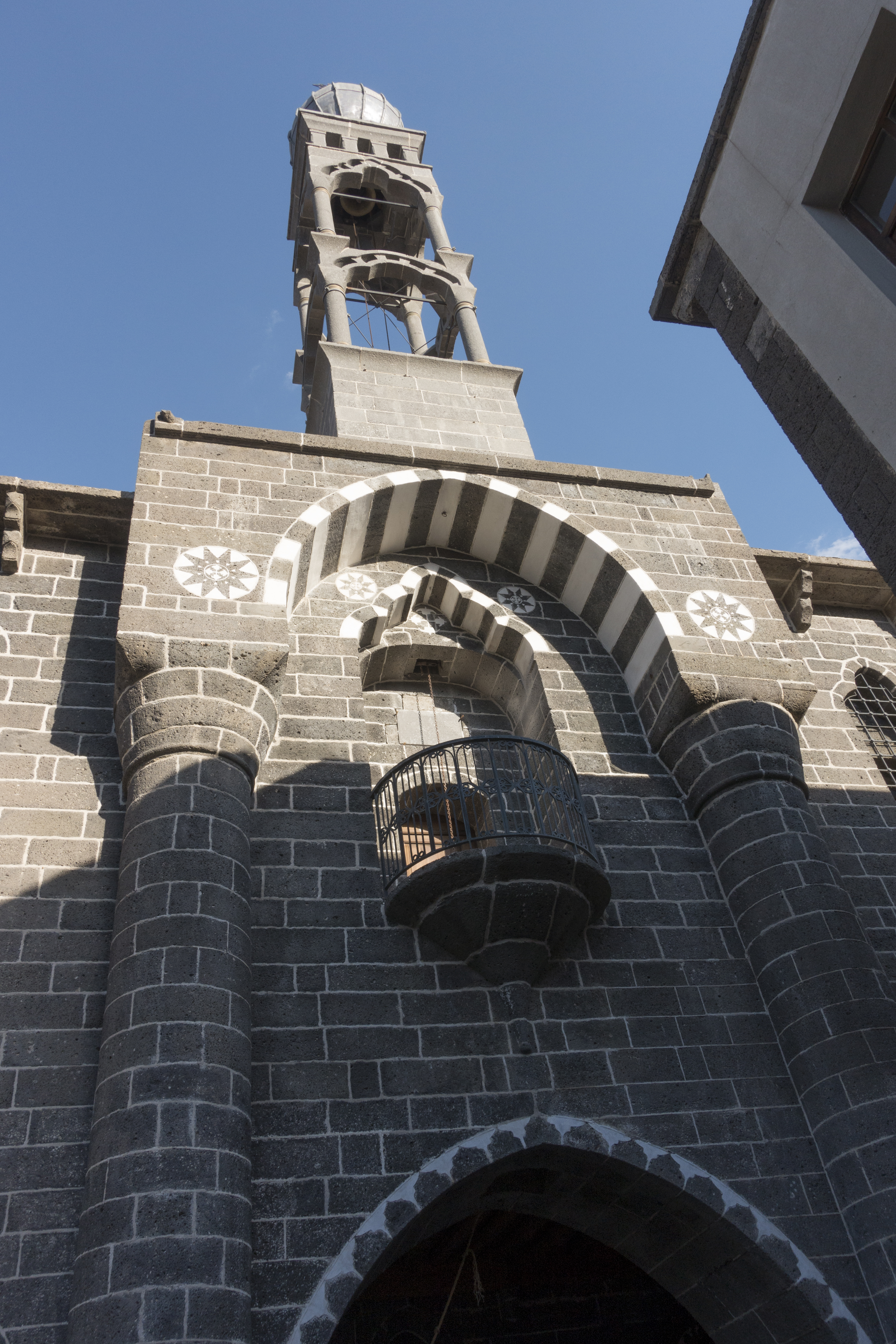
Entrance façade and bell tower of the church

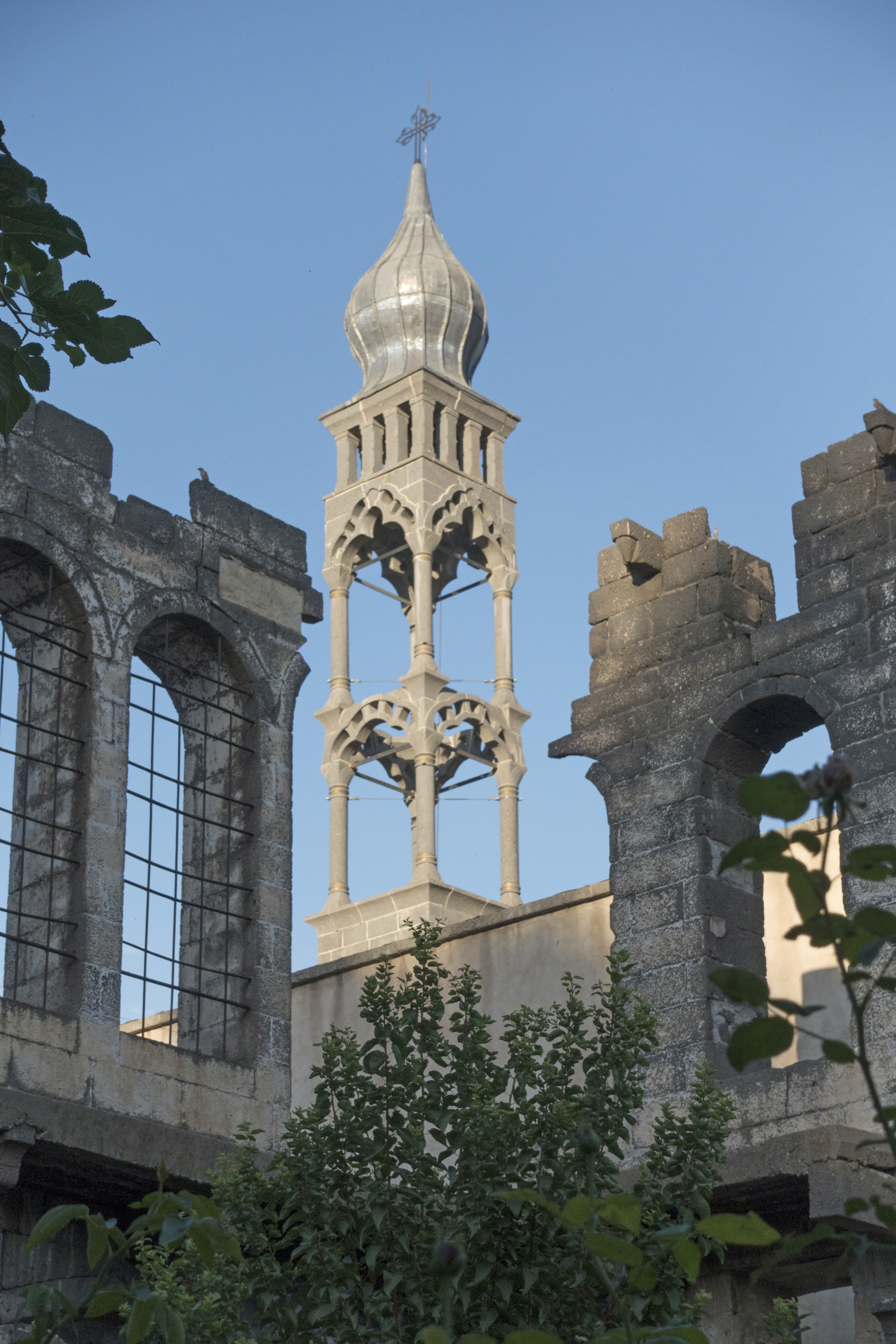
The bell tower of the church in 2014

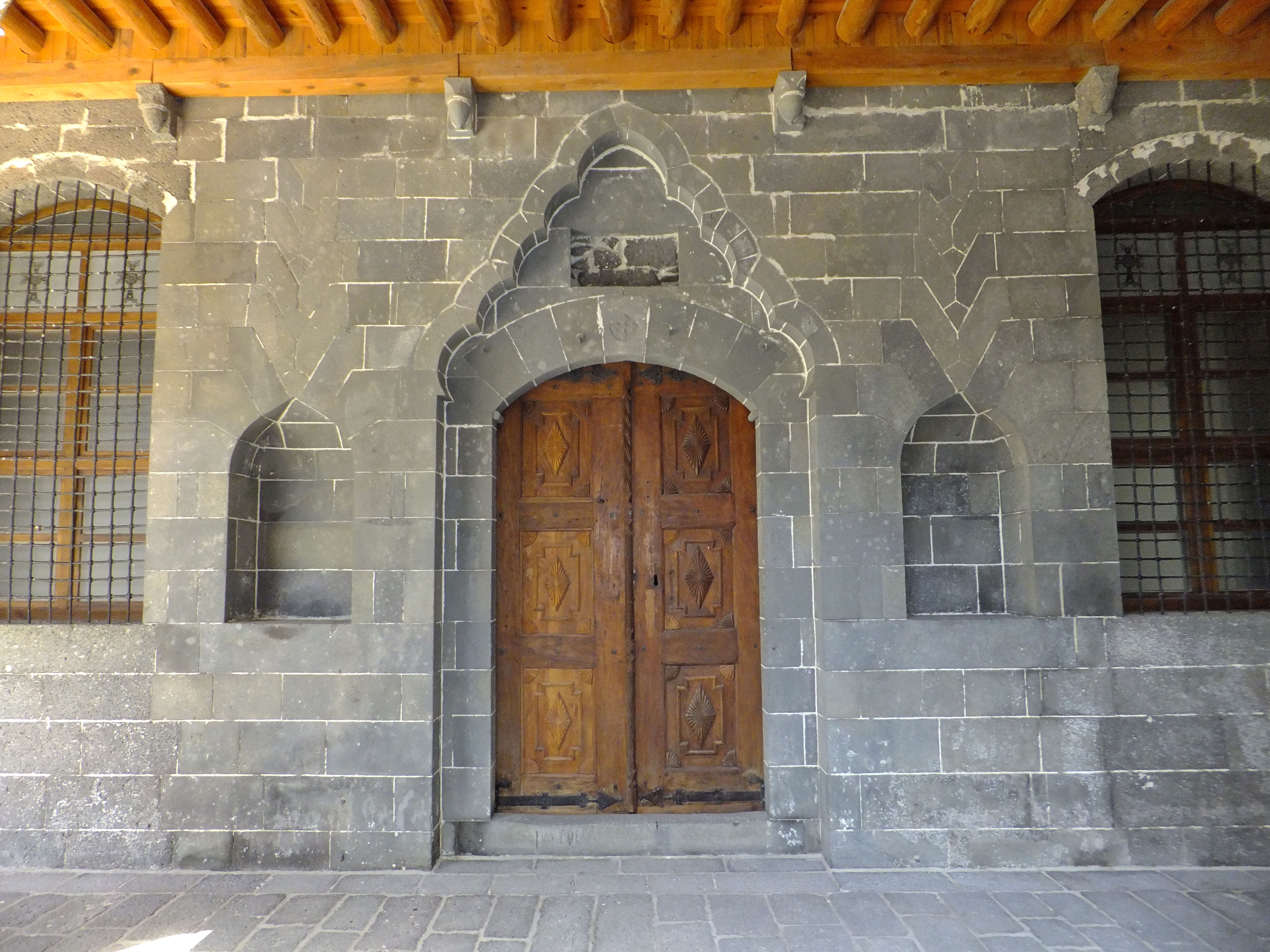
One of the church entrances under the front portico of the building

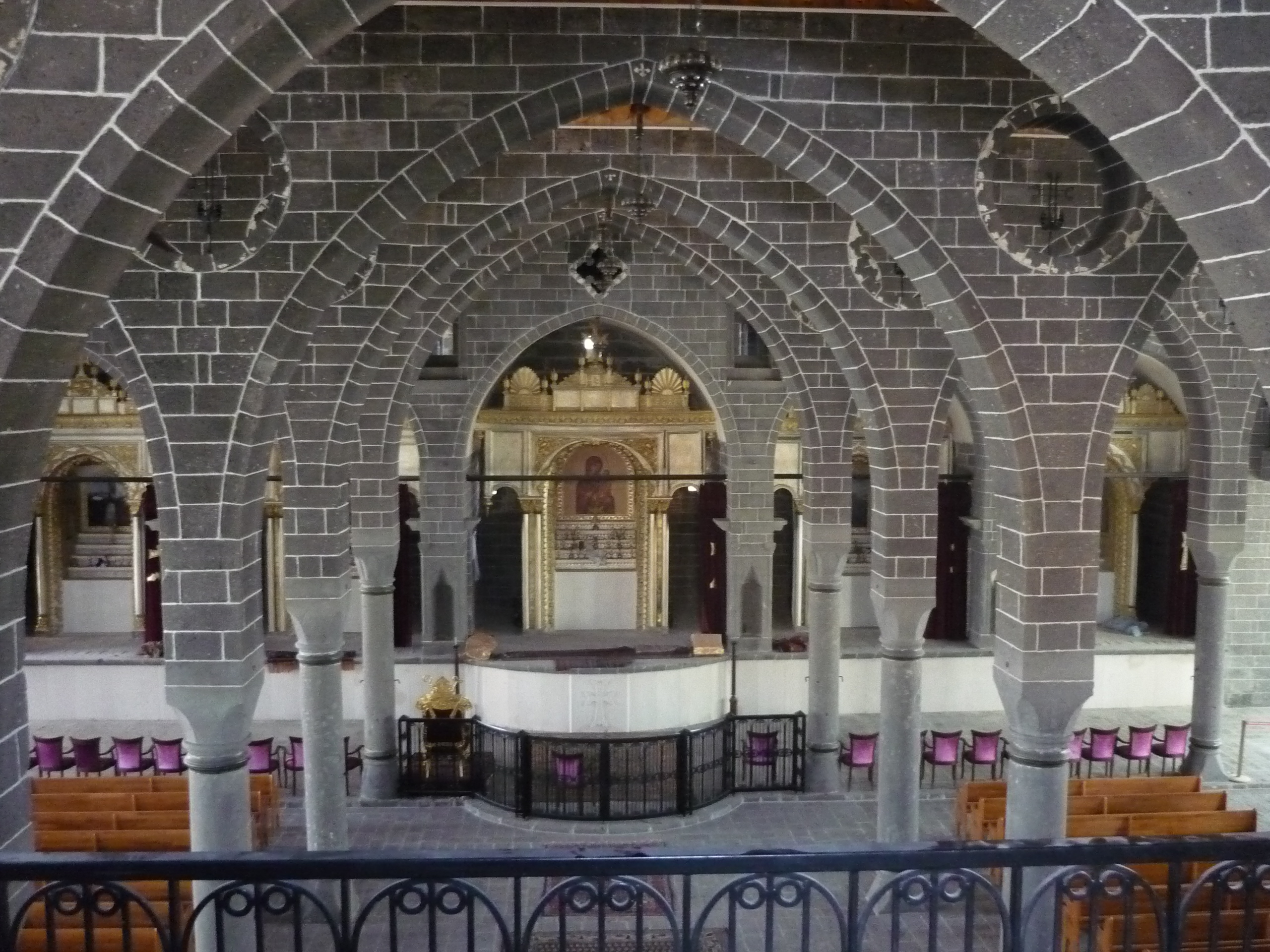
Interior of the church, looking towards the altars

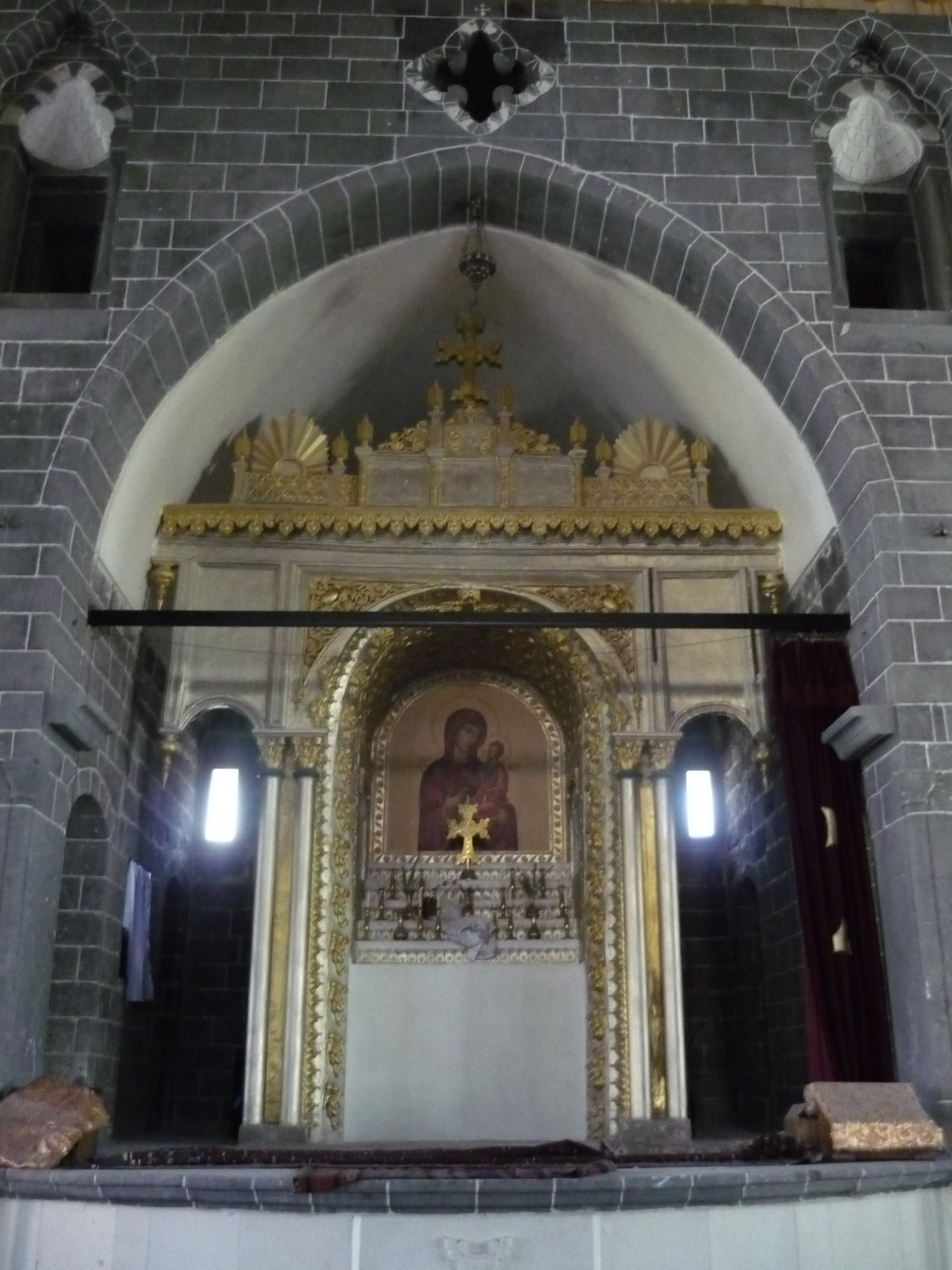
The middle altar of the church

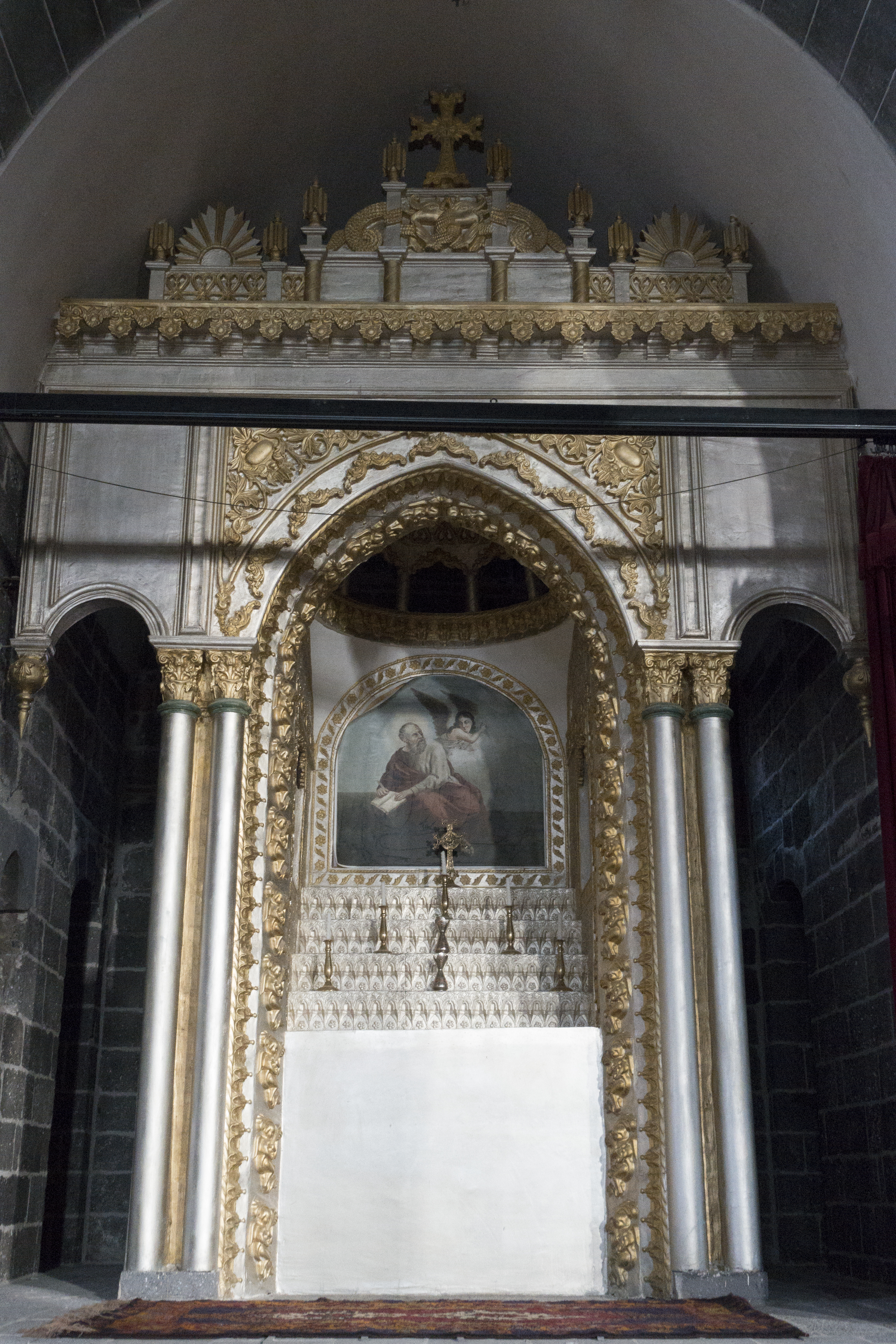
Close-up of one of the other five altars on the ground floor

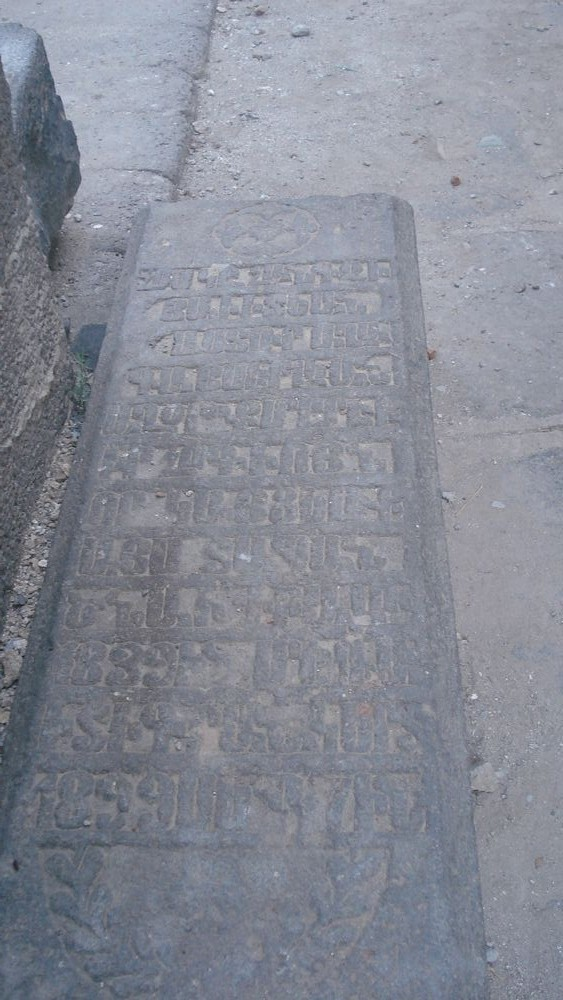
A tombstone inside the church (pictured in 2008 prior to restoration)

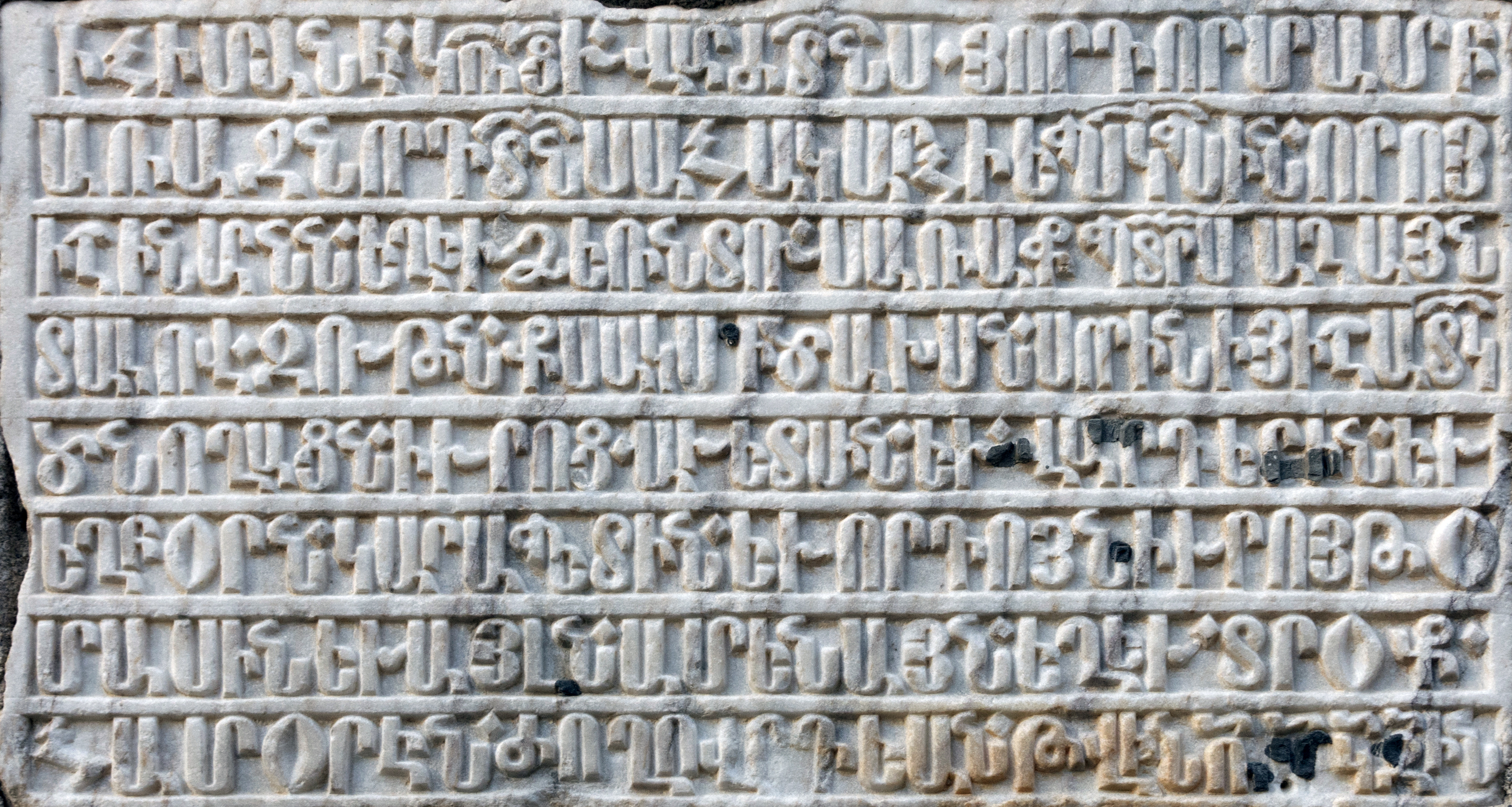
An Armenian inscription plaque attached to one of the buildings in the church compound
