= Beybulak, Sur =

Village in Turkey

Beybulak
- Neighbourhood
- Location in Turkey
- Coordinates: 38°06′N 40°33′E
- Country: Turkey
- Province: Diyarbakır
- District: Sur
- Population (2022): 995
- Time zone: UTC+3 (TRT)

Beybulak is a neighbourhood in the municipality and district of Sur, Diyarbakır Province in Turkey. Its population is 995 (2022).
