= Yenice, Sur =

Village in Turkey

Yenice
- Neighbourhood
- Location in Turkey
- Coordinates: 38°2′38″N 40°23′54″E
- Country: Turkey
- Province: Diyarbakır
- District: Sur
- Population (2022): 318
- Time zone: UTC+3 (TRT)

Yenice is a neighbourhood in the municipality and district of Sur, Diyarbakır Province in Turkey. It is populated by Kurds and had a population of 318 in 2022.
