= Özekli, Sur =

Village in Turkey

Özekli
- Neighbourhood
- Location in Turkey
- Coordinates: 38°14′N 40°24′E
- Country: Turkey
- Province: Diyarbakır
- District: Sur
- Population (2022): 2,509
- Time zone: UTC+3 (TRT)

Özekli is a neighbourhood of the municipality and district of Sur, Diyarbakır Province, Turkey. Its population is 2,509 (2022). Before the 2013 reorganisation, it was a town (belde).
