= Dervişhasan, Sur =

Village in Turkey

Dervişhasan
- Neighbourhood
- Location in Turkey
- Coordinates: 38°04′N 40°25′E
- Country: Turkey
- Province: Diyarbakır
- District: Sur
- Population (2022): 608
- Time zone: UTC+3 (TRT)

Dervişhasan is a neighbourhood in the municipality and district of Sur, Diyarbakır Province in Turkey. Its population is 608 (2022).
