= Konacık, Sur =

Village in Turkey

Konacık
- Neighbourhood
- Location within Turkey
- Country: Turkey
- Province: Diyarbakır
- District: Sur
- Population (2022): 326
- Time zone: UTC+3 (TRT)

Konacık is a neighbourhood in the municipality and district of Sur, Diyarbakır Province in Turkey. Its population is 326 (2022).
