= Ziyaret, Sur =

Village in Turkey

Ziyaret
- Neighbourhood
- Location in Turkey
- Coordinates: 38°07′58″N 40°23′56″E
- Country: Turkey
- Province: Diyarbakır
- District: Sur
- Population (2022): 490
- Time zone: UTC+3 (TRT)

Ziyaret is a neighbourhood in the municipality and district of Sur, Diyarbakır Province in Turkey. Its population is 490 (2022).
