= Bağıvar, Sur =

Bağıvar
- Neighbourhood
- Location in Turkey
- Coordinates: 37.86785°N 40.24245°E
- Country: Turkey
- Province: Diyarbakır
- District: Sur
- Population (2025): 8,802
- Time zone: UTC+3 (TRT)

Bağıvar (Arabic: كعبية; Syriac: ܟܥܒܝܗ, romanized: Kaʿbiya) (Note: Also known as Ka’biyya, Kahbiye, Kahby, Kâbi, Kiabi, Kiabikui, K’apig, Kapig, Tahib, Ka‘biyye, Ka’biye, Kabia, or Kabié.) is a neighbourhood of the municipality and district of Sur, Diyarbakır Province, southeastern Turkey. It had a population of 8,802 in 2025.

== History ==
Kaʿbiya (today called Bağıvar) was historically inhabited by Armenians and Syriac Orthodox Christians. In 1880, there were 7 Armenian hearths. There was an Armenian church of Surb Kristapor. On 3 November 1895, the village was "thoroughly pillaged and destroyed" during the Massacres of Diyarbekir (1895). 80 of the 100 houses in the village were burned. The American missionaries Rendel and Helen Harris recorded that Kaʿbiya still lay in ruins when they passed through the village in July 1896. It was located in the Diyarbakır central district (merkez kaza) in the Diyarbakır sanjak in the Diyarbekir vilayet in c. 1900. In 1914, it was inhabited by 1600 Syriacs, according to the list presented to the Paris Peace Conference by the Assyro-Chaldean delegation. There were 165 households.

Amidst the Sayfo, on 10/23 April 1915, 70 Al-Khamsin militiamen led by 3 Turkish officers set out from Diyarbakır to Kaʿbiya, arriving at 6pm, and encircled the village to prevent anyone from leaving. On the following morning, the Al-Khamsin militiamen ordered the village headman George to give them all of the men over 15 years of age in the village otherwise they would burn down any house in which anyone was found to have been hiding and shoot all of their family members. The men gave themselves over to the militiamen and were bound by them. (Note: Gaunt states there were 125 men whilst Abed Mshiho Neman of Qarabash gives 152.) The militiamen then demanded all of the weapons at Kaʿbiya and accused the villagers of hiding automatic rifles, helmets, cannons, and other weaponry, which they denied. The militiamen refused to believe the villagers' denials, and thus tortured some of them by beating their feet for 9 hours, executed 5 leading villagers, and then tortured 2 priests. At around 11pm, the soldiers demanded that the villagers prepared a large feast for them. The girls in the village were repeatedly raped by the soldiers whilst the feast was prepared.

The soldiers imprisoned the village's men at a caravanserai named Misafir-Khana at Diyarbakır and tortured them for five days. On 15/28 April, the men were told they were going to be forced to build roads, but were taken to a hill near Igil, where they were stripped and shot, and their bodies were dumped in the Tigris. Kaʿbiya was attacked and plundered by Kurds at 5pm on 20 April or 3 May. Some villagers fled to the town of Male, but 50 people were killed during their escape. At Male, the refugees were refused shelter at the Church of the Holy Mother by Father Bshara, who alerted Rashid Pasha, mayor of Diyarbakır, and 4 soldiers were sent to escort the refugees back to Kaʿbiya. 4 villagers were killed by the soldiers en route to Kaʿbiya. On 30 May or 12 June, the militia leader Shakir Bey and 50 Kurds of the Rama tribe seized all of the remaining men, extorted 1500 gold dinars, and violated the women and girls. The men were murdered at Kurt Kaya (Wolf Rock) and their bodies were burned. Some of the women and children were taken as hostages whilst others fled to Diyarbakır.

550 refugees from Kaʿbiya who had taken refuge at Diyarbakır were given guarantees of safety and taken back to their village, arriving on 12 September. The next morning, about 100 Circassian soldiers and about 50 Turkish soldiers led by Khalil Chalabi forced the villagers to leave Kaʿbiya on the pretension that they were to be returned to Diyarbakır as the governor had changed his mind and Muslims who had been expelled from Bulgaria were to be settled there instead. The surviving villagers were instead taken to Kurt Kaya, where the men were shot and the women and girls were raped and killed. Two women and three boys were discovered amongst the bodies alive by a trader named Abdalla of Mosul and taken to the Mor Hananyo Monastery; the two women died two days later.

== Bibliography ==
- Abed Mshiho Neman of Qarabash (2021) [1918]. Sayfo – An Account of the Assyrian Genocide. Translated by Michael Abdalla; Łukasz Kiczko. Edinburgh University Press.
- Barsoum, Aphrem (2008). The History of Tur Abdin. Translated by Matti Moosa. Gorgias Press.
- Courtois, Sébastien de (2004). The Forgotten Genocide: Eastern Christians, The Last Arameans. Translated by Vincent Aurora. Gorgias Press.
- Gaunt, David (2006). Massacres, Resistance, Protectors: Muslim-Christian Relations in Eastern Anatolia during World War I. Gorgias Press.
- Harris, J. Rendel; Harris, Helen B. (1897). Letters from the scenes of the recent massacres in Armenia.
- Jongerden, Joost; Verheij, Jelle, eds. (2012). Social Relations in Ottoman Diyarbekir, 1870-1915. Brill.
- Kévorkian, Raymond H. (2006). "Demographic Changes in the Armenian Population of Diarbekir, 1895-1914". In Richard G. Hovannisian (ed.). Armenian Tigranakert/Diarbekir and Edessa/Urfa. Mazda Publishers.
