= Kuşburnu, Sur =

Village in Turkey

Kuşburnu
- Neighbourhood
- Location in Turkey
- Coordinates: 37°59′40″N 40°21′49″E
- Country: Turkey
- Province: Diyarbakır
- District: Sur
- Population (2022): 68
- Time zone: UTC+3 (TRT)

Kuşburnu (Kurdish: Ervenî) is a neighbourhood in the municipality and district of Sur, Diyarbakır Province in Turkey. It is populated by Kurds of the Hasenan and Mendan tribes and had a population of 68 in 2022.
