= Bostanpınar, Sur =

Village in Turkey

Bostanpınar
- Neighbourhood
- Location in Turkey
- Coordinates: 38.0830°N 40.3161°E
- Country: Turkey
- Province: Diyarbakır
- District: Sur
- Population (2022): 716
- Time zone: UTC+3 (TRT)

Bostanpınar is a neighbourhood in the municipality and district of Sur, Diyarbakır Province in Turkey. Its population is 716 (2022).
