= Sapanca, Sur =

Village in Turkey

Sapanca
- Neighbourhood
- Location in Turkey
- Coordinates: 38°10′33″N 40°19′27″E
- Country: Turkey
- Province: Diyarbakır
- District: Sur
- Population (2022): 658
- Time zone: UTC+3 (TRT)

Sapanca is a neighbourhood in the municipality and district of Sur, Diyarbakır Province in Turkey. Its population is 658 (2022).
