= Dumrul, Sur =

Village in Turkey

Dumrul
- Neighbourhood
- Location in Turkey
- Coordinates: 38°12′51″N 40°18′26″E
- Country: Turkey
- Province: Diyarbakır
- District: Sur
- Population (2022): 694
- Time zone: UTC+3 (TRT)

Dumrul (Kurdish: Hacidel) is a neighbourhood in the municipality and district of Sur, Diyarbakır Province in Turkey. It is populated by Kurds and had a population of 694 in 2022.
