= Sarılar, Sur =

Village in Turkey

Sarılar
- Neighbourhood
- Country: Turkey
- Province: Diyarbakır
- District: Sur
- Population (2022): 240
- Time zone: UTC+3 (TRT)

Sarılar is a neighbourhood in the municipality and district of Sur, Diyarbakır Province in Turkey. Its population is 240 (2022).
