= Koyungüden, Sur =

Village in Turkey

Koyungüden
- Neighbourhood
- Location in Turkey
- Coordinates: 38°04′N 40°22′E
- Country: Turkey
- Province: Diyarbakır
- District: Sur
- Population (2022): 553
- Time zone: UTC+3 (TRT)

Koyungüden is a neighbourhood in the municipality and district of Sur, Diyarbakır Province in Turkey. Its population is 553 (2022).
