= Tezgeçer, Sur =

Village in Turkey

Tezgeçer
- Neighbourhood
- Location in Turkey
- Coordinates: 37°57′N 40°27′E
- Country: Turkey
- Province: Diyarbakır
- District: Sur
- Population (2022): 365
- Time zone: UTC+3 (TRT)

Tezgeçer is a neighbourhood in the municipality and district of Sur, Diyarbakır Province in Turkey. Its population is 365 (2022).
