= Köşk, Sur =

Köşk
- Neighbourhood
- Location in Turkey
- Coordinates: 38.02439°N 40.36672°E
- Country: Turkey
- Province: Diyarbakır
- District: Sur
- Time zone: UTC+3 (TRT)

Köşk (Note: Formerly known as Keuchk, Keuck, Koshk, Köschk, or Qoshk.) is a neighbourhood of the municipality and district of Sur, Diyarbakır Province, Turkey.

== History ==
Keuchk (today called Köşk) was historically inhabited by Armenians and Syriac Orthodox Christians. It was located in the Diyarbakır central district (merkez kaza) in the Diyarbakır sanjak in the Diyarbekir vilayet in c. 1900. In 1914, it was inhabited by 100 Syriacs, according to the list presented to the Paris Peace Conference by the Assyro-Chaldean delegation. Amidst the Sayfo, the men from Keuchk and several neighbouring villages were shot on 7 May 1915 by the Al-Khamsin militia at the instigation of the villages' owner, Qasem Bey. 114 men from these villages were killed, according to the testimony of survivors. The women and children were forced to carry out agricultural work and were then forced to convert to Islam or were killed following the end of the agricultural season.

== Bibliography ==
- Abed Mshiho Neman of Qarabash (2021) [1918]. Sayfo – An Account of the Assyrian Genocide. Translated by Michael Abdalla; Łukasz Kiczko. Edinburgh University Press.
- Gaunt, David (2006). Massacres, Resistance, Protectors: Muslim-Christian Relations in Eastern Anatolia during World War I. Gorgias Press.
- Jongerden, Joost; Verheij, Jelle, eds. (2012). Social Relations in Ottoman Diyarbekir, 1870-1915. Brill.
