= Eryolu, Sur =

Village in Turkey

Eryolu
- Neighbourhood
- Location in Turkey
- Coordinates: 38°09′N 40°33′E
- Country: Turkey
- Province: Diyarbakır
- District: Sur
- Population (2022): 346
- Time zone: UTC+3 (TRT)

Eryolu is a neighbourhood in the municipality and district of Sur, Diyarbakır Province in Turkey. Its population is 346 (2022).
