= Kumrucak, Sur =

Village in Turkey

Kumrucak
- Neighbourhood
- Location in Turkey
- Coordinates: 38°03′08″N 40°28′07″E
- Country: Turkey
- Province: Diyarbakır
- District: Sur
- Population (2022): 250
- Time zone: UTC+3 (TRT)

Kumrucak is a neighbourhood in the municipality and district of Sur, Diyarbakır Province in Turkey. Its population is 250 (2022).
