= Karaçalı, Sur =

Village in Turkey

Karaçalı
- Neighbourhood
- Location in Turkey
- Coordinates: 37°57′13″N 40°19′6″E
- Country: Turkey
- Province: Diyarbakır
- District: Sur
- Population (2022): 1,880
- Time zone: UTC+3 (TRT)

Karaçalı (Kurdish: Tiloli) (Note: Formerly known as Tavalou, Tavalu, Tilalou, Tilalu, or Tilâle.) is a neighbourhood in the municipality and district of Sur, Diyarbakır Province in Turkey. It is populated by Kurds of the Hasenan tribe and had a population of 1,880 in 2022.

== History ==
Tavalou (today called Karaçalı) was historically inhabited by Armenians. There were 8 Armenian hearths in 1880. The village was located in the Diyarbakır central district (merkez kaza) in the Diyarbakır sanjak in the Diyarbekir vilayet in c. 1900.

== Bibliography ==
- Jongerden, Joost; Verheij, Jelle, eds. (2012). Social Relations in Ottoman Diyarbekir, 1870-1915. Brill.
- Kévorkian, Raymond H. (2006). "Demographic Changes in the Armenian Population of Diarbekir, 1895-1914". In Richard G. Hovannisian (ed.). Armenian Tigranakert/Diarbekir and Edessa/Urfa. Mazda Publishers.
