= Alabal, Sur =

Village in Turkey

Alabal
- Neighbourhood
- Location within Turkey
- Coordinates: 38.0539°N 40.5540°E
- Country: Turkey
- Province: Diyarbakır
- District: Sur
- Population (2022): 279
- Time zone: UTC+3 (TRT)

Alabal (Kurdish: Kefnecar) is a neighbourhood in the municipality and district of Sur, Diyarbakır Province in Turkey. Its population is 279 (2022).
