= Hacıosmanköy, Sur =

Village in Turkey

Hacıosmanköy
- Neighbourhood
- Location in Turkey
- Coordinates: 37.89646°N 40.39962°E
- Country: Turkey
- Province: Diyarbakır
- District: Sur
- Time zone: UTC+3 (TRT)

Hacıosmanköy (Note: Also known as Hacıosman. Formerly known as ‘Abbase or Abbas.) is a neighbourhood in the municipality and district of Sur, Diyarbakır Province in Turkey.

== History ==
‘Abbase (today called Hacıosmanköy) was historically inhabited by Syriac Orthodox Christians. It was located in the Diyarbakır central district (merkez kaza) in the Diyarbakır sanjak in the Diyarbekir vilayet in c. 1900. Amidst the Sayfo, the men from ‘Abbase were slaughtered alongside men from several other neighbouring villages on 7 May 1915 by an Al-Khamsin death squad at the instigation of the village's owner, Qasem Bey. 114 men from these villages were killed, according to the testimony of survivors. The women and children were forced to carry out agricultural work. The women and children had to convert to Islam or be killed following the end of the agricultural season.

== Bibliography ==
- Gaunt, David (2006). Massacres, Resistance, Protectors: Muslim-Christian Relations in Eastern Anatolia during World War I. Gorgias Press.
- Jongerden, Joost; Verheij, Jelle, eds. (2012). Social Relations in Ottoman Diyarbekir, 1870-1915. Brill.
