= Kapaklıpınar, Sur =

Village in Turkey

Kapaklıpınar
- Neighbourhood
- Location in Turkey
- Coordinates: 37°56′6″N 40°28′30″E
- Country: Turkey
- Province: Diyarbakır
- District: Sur
- Population (2022): 316
- Time zone: UTC+3 (TRT)

Kapaklıpınar is a neighbourhood in the municipality and district of Sur, Diyarbakır Province in Turkey. Its population is 316 (2022).
