= Sati, Sur =

Village in Turkey

Sati
- Neighbourhood
- Location in Turkey
- Coordinates: 37.86074°N 40.3581°E
- Country: Turkey
- Province: Diyarbakır
- District: Sur
- Population (2025): 1,122
- Time zone: UTC+3 (TRT)

Sati (Kurdish: Satya; Syriac: Saṭiyah) (Note: Also known as Sa’diye, Sa‘diyye, Satié, Satia, Satı, Satıköy, Sati-Keuï, Sati-Koy, Satu-Koy, or Satou-Keuï.) is a neighbourhood in the municipality and district of Sur, Diyarbakır Province in Turkey. It is populated by Kurds and had a population of 1,122 in 2025.

== History ==
Saṭiyah (today called Sati) was historically inhabited by Syriac Orthodox Christians and Armenians. In the Syriac Orthodox patriarchal register of dues of 1870, it was recorded that the village had 6 households, who did not pay any dues, and did not have a church or a priest. There were 82 Armenian hearths in 1880. There was an Armenian church of Surb Tukhmanuk. By 1895, the total population was about 300. On 1 November 1895, the village was attacked and plundered during the massacres in the Diyarbekir vilayet by Kurds who murdered the men and children and seized the women and girls. (Note: Gaunt erroneously places the attack on 1 October 1895.) The Christians attempted to take refuge in the church, but it was set on fire by the Kurds after they had climbed atop its roof and drilled a hole through which they threw hay and poured crude oil that was then set alight. The Kurds then slaughtered the Christians as they attempted to flee the church; only three people survived.

The village was located in the Diyarbakır central district (merkez kaza) in the Diyarbakır sanjak in the Diyarbekir vilayet in c. 1900. In 1914, it was populated by 350 Syriacs, according to the list presented to the Paris Peace Conference by the Assyro-Chaldean delegation. Amidst the Sayfo, in 1915, the villagers were killed by militia on the orders of the kaymakam of Al-Madine and the priest was tortured and killed.

== Bibliography ==
- Abed Mshiho Neman of Qarabash (2021) [1918]. Sayfo – An Account of the Assyrian Genocide. Translated by Michael Abdalla; Łukasz Kiczko. Edinburgh University Press.
- Bcheiry, Iskandar (2009). The Syriac Orthodox Patriarchal Register of Dues of 1870: An Unpublished Historical Document from the Late Ottoman Period. Gorgias Press.
- Gaunt, David (2006). Massacres, Resistance, Protectors: Muslim-Christian Relations in Eastern Anatolia during World War I. Gorgias Press.
- Jongerden, Joost; Verheij, Jelle, eds. (2012). Social Relations in Ottoman Diyarbekir, 1870-1915. Brill.
- Kévorkian, Raymond H. (2006). "Demographic Changes in the Armenian Population of Diarbekir, 1895-1914". In Richard G. Hovannisian (ed.). Armenian Tigranakert/Diarbekir and Edessa/Urfa. Mazda Publishers.
- Tîgrîs, Amed; Çakar, Yıldız (2012). Amed : erdnîgarî, dîrok, çand (in Kurdish).
