= Harmanlar, Sur =

Village in Turkey

Harmanlar
- Neighbourhood
- Country: Turkey
- Province: Diyarbakır
- District: Sur
- Population (2022): 280
- Time zone: UTC+3 (TRT)

Harmanlar is a neighbourhood in the municipality and district of Sur, Diyarbakır Province in Turkey. Its population is 280 (2022).
