= Sarıyazma, Sur =

Village in Turkey

Sarıyazma
- Neighbourhood
- Location in Turkey
- Coordinates: 37°56′N 40°28′E
- Country: Turkey
- Province: Diyarbakır
- District: Sur
- Population (2022): 83
- Time zone: UTC+3 (TRT)

Sarıyazma is a neighbourhood in the municipality and district of Sur, Diyarbakır Province in Turkey. Its population is 83 (2022).
