= Büyükakören, Sur =

Village in Turkey

Büyükakören
- Neighbourhood
- Location in Turkey
- Coordinates: 38.2328°N 40.3566°E
- Country: Turkey
- Province: Diyarbakır
- District: Sur
- Population (2022): 1,384
- Time zone: UTC+3 (TRT)

Büyükakören is a neighbourhood in the municipality and district of Sur, Diyarbakır Province in Turkey. Its population is 1,384 (2022).
