= Küçükkadı, Sur =

Village in Turkey

Küçükkadı
- Neighbourhood
- Location in Turkey
- Coordinates: 37°57′56″N 40°17′26″E
- Country: Turkey
- Province: Diyarbakır
- District: Sur
- Population (2022): 650
- Time zone: UTC+3 (TRT)

Küçükkadı is a neighbourhood in the municipality and district of Sur, Diyarbakır Province in Turkey. It is populated by Kurds of the Îzol tribe and had a population of 650 in 2022.
