= Bahçecik, Sur =

Bahçecik
- Neighbourhood
- Location in Turkey
- Coordinates: 37°53′35″N 40°26′53″E
- Country: Turkey
- Province: Diyarbakır
- District: Sur
- Population (2022): 121
- Time zone: UTC+3 (TRT)
- Postal code: 21200

Bahçecik (Note: Formerly known as Bağacık, Bağçecik, Baghjachik, Baghtchadjig, Baghtchadjak, Bagdjaoljik, Baghchajig, Baghchajak, Bagh-Chejik, Baglit, or Baggetshik.) is a neighbourhood of the municipality and district of Sur, Diyarbakır Province, southeastern Turkey. Its population is 121 (2022). The village is inhabited by Yazidis.

== History ==
Baghchajig (today called Bahçecik) was historically inhabited by Armenians and Syriac Orthodox Christians. In 1880, there were 8 Armenian hearths. There was an Armenian church of Surb Daniel. It was located in the Diyarbakır central district (merkez kaza) in the Diyarbakır sanjak in the Diyarbekir vilayet in c. 1900. In 1914, it was inhabited by 50 Syriacs, according to the list presented to the Paris Peace Conference by the Assyro-Chaldean delegation.

Amidst the Sayfo, the men from Baghchajig and several neighbouring villages were shot on 7 May 1915 by the Al-Khamsin militia at the instigation of the village's owner, Qasem Bey. 114 men from these villages were killed, according to the testimony of survivors. The women and children were forced to carry out agricultural work and were then forced to convert to Islam or were killed following the end of the agricultural season. 4 Syriac families, consisting of about 50 people, were murdered during the war.

== Bibliography ==
- Abed Mshiho Neman of Qarabash (2021) [1918]. Sayfo – An Account of the Assyrian Genocide. Translated by Michael Abdalla; Łukasz Kiczko. Edinburgh University Press.
- Gaunt, David (2006). Massacres, Resistance, Protectors: Muslim-Christian Relations in Eastern Anatolia during World War I. Gorgias Press.
- Jongerden, Joost; Verheij, Jelle, eds. (2012). Social Relations in Ottoman Diyarbekir, 1870-1915. Brill.
- Kévorkian, Raymond H. (2006). "Demographic Changes in the Armenian Population of Diarbekir, 1895-1914". In Richard G. Hovannisian (ed.). Armenian Tigranakert/Diarbekir and Edessa/Urfa. Mazda Publishers.
- Turan, Ahmet (1986). "Yezidiler". Ondokuz Mayis University Journal of Education Faculty. 1 (1): 188–199.
