= Ağaçlıdere, Sur =

Village in Turkey

Ağaçlıdere
- Neighbourhood
- Location in Turkey
- Coordinates: 38°07′N 40°20′E
- Country: Turkey
- Province: Diyarbakır
- District: Sur
- Population (2022): 732
- Time zone: UTC+3 (TRT)

Ağaçlıdere is a neighbourhood in the municipality and district of Sur, Diyarbakır Province in Turkey. Its population is 732 (2022).
