= Soğanlı, Sur =

Village in Turkey

Soğanlı
- Neighbourhood
- Location within Turkey
- Coordinates: 38°05′49″N 40°18′36″E
- Country: Turkey
- Province: Diyarbakır
- District: Sur
- Population (2022): 897
- Time zone: UTC+3 (TRT)

Soğanlı (Kurdish: Axmeşat) is a neighbourhood in the municipality and district of Sur, Diyarbakır Province in Turkey. Its population is 897 (2022).
