= Nefirtaş, Sur =

Neighbourhood in Sur, Diyarbakır, Turkey

Nefirtaş
- Neighbourhood
- Location in Turkey
- Coordinates: 38°16′N 40°23′E
- Country: Turkey
- Province: Diyarbakır
- District: Sur
- Population (2022): 425
- Time zone: UTC+3 (TRT)

Nefirtaş is a neighbourhood in the municipality and district of Sur, Diyarbakır Province in Turkey. Its population is 425 (2022).
