= Doğanlı, Sur =

Village in Turkey

Doğanlı
- Neighbourhood
- Location in Turkey
- Coordinates: 38°13′55″N 40°19′37″E
- Country: Turkey
- Province: Diyarbakır
- District: Sur
- Population (2022): 1,515
- Time zone: UTC+3 (TRT)

Doğanlı is a neighbourhood in the municipality and district of Sur, Diyarbakır Province in Turkey. Its population is 1,515 (2022).
