= Kangarlu =

Kangarlu or Kangarloo (Persian: كنگرلو) may refer to the following places in Iran:

- Kangarlu, Ardabil
- Kangarlu, West Azerbaijan
- Kangarlu, Zanjan

== See also ==
- Kangarli (disambiguation)
