= Kayayolu, Sur =

Village in Turkey

Kayayolu
- Neighbourhood
- Country: Turkey
- Province: Diyarbakır
- District: Sur
- Population (2022): 83
- Time zone: UTC+3 (TRT)

Kayayolu is a neighbourhood in the municipality and district of Sur, Diyarbakır Province in Turkey. Its population is 83 (2022).
