= Karaçimen, Sur =

Village in Turkey

Karaçimen
- Neighbourhood
- Location in Turkey
- Coordinates: 38°09′N 40°37′E
- Country: Turkey
- Province: Diyarbakır
- District: Sur
- Population (2022): 239
- Time zone: UTC+3 (TRT)

Karaçimen is a neighbourhood in the municipality and district of Sur, Diyarbakır Province in Turkey. Its population is 239 (2022).
