= Sur, Diyarbakır =

Sur
- District and municipality
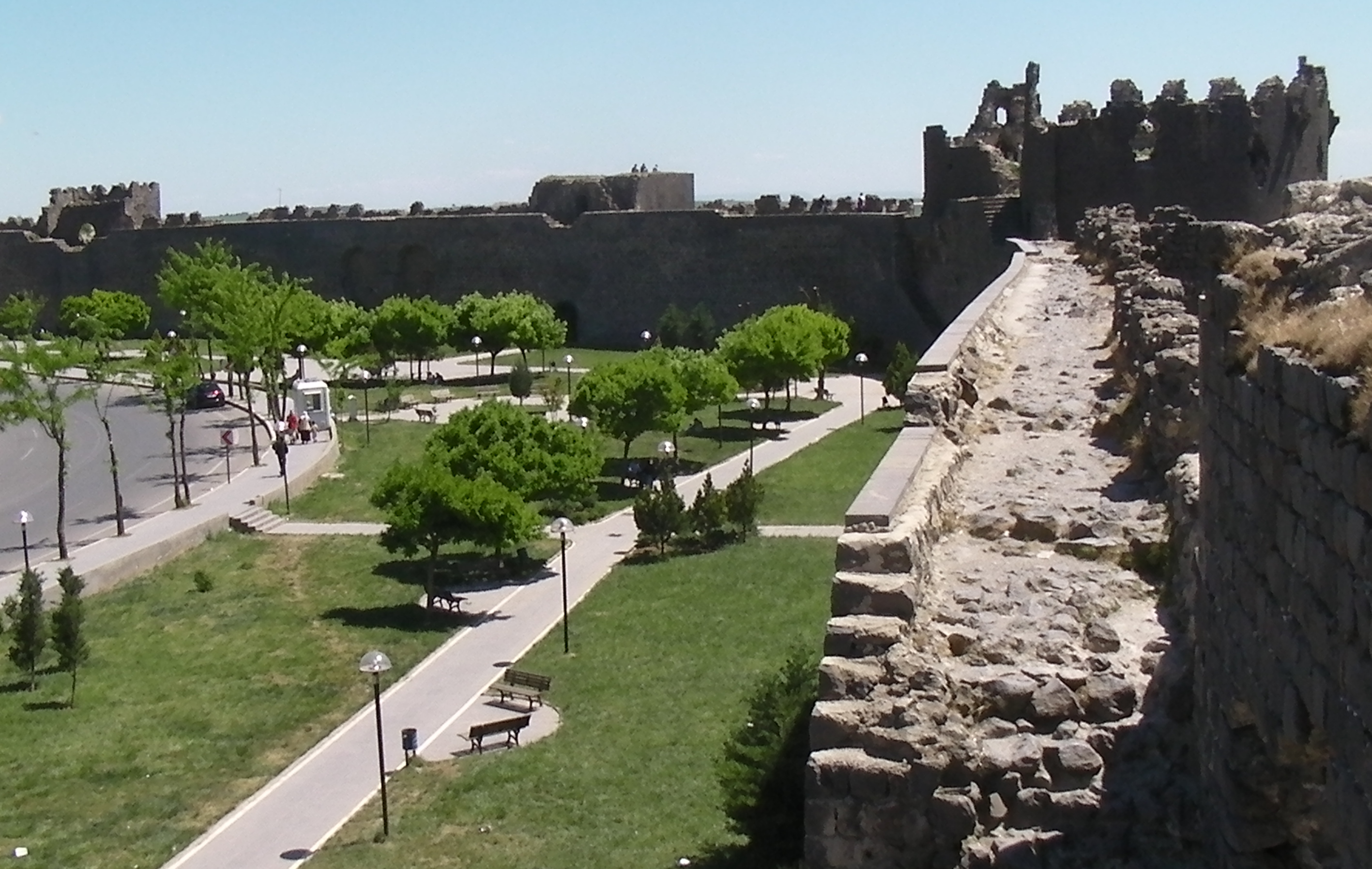
- Walls of Diyarbakır

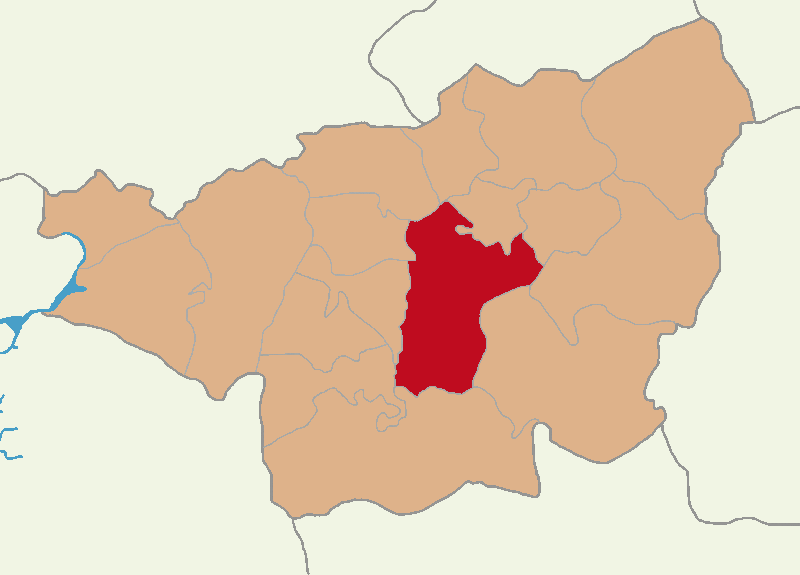
- Map showing Sur District in Diyarbakır Province

- Location within Turkey
- Coordinates: 37°54′38″N 40°14′09″E
- Country: Turkey
- Province: Diyarbakır
- Area: 1,227 km^{2} (474 sq mi)
- Population (2022): 100,613
  - Density: 82.00/km^{2} (212.4/sq mi)
- Time zone: UTC+3 (TRT)
- Postal code: 21300
- Area code: 0412
- Website: www.sur.bel.tr

Sur is a municipality and district of Diyarbakır Province, Turkey. Its area is 1,227 km^{2}, and its population is 100,613 (2022). It covers the eastern part of the city of Diyarbakır and the adjacent countryside. The historical Diyarbakır Fortress lies in this district, which takes its name from the castle walls (Turkish: sur).

== Background ==
Sur district was created in 2008 from part of the central district (Merkez) of Diyarbakır. It is situated at the Tigris bank, on the felsic lava of the shield volcano Karaca Dağ at an elevation of 600 m (2,000 ft) above mean sea level. Many historic buildings and structures in the district are witness of several civilizations and rich cultures, which were hosted in the location in the history.

The background of Sur goes back to 7500 BC. Archaeological excavations showed that world's oldest settlement was located in the region. Civilizations ruled here are Hurrians (Bronze Age), Mitanni (c. 1500 BC–c. 1300 BC), Hittites (c. 1600 BC–c. 1178 BC), Assur (early Bronze Age), Persians (early 10th century BC), Alexander the Great (356 BC – 323 BC), Roman Empire, Byzantine Empire, Marwanids, Ayyubid Empire and Ottoman Empire.

== Politics ==
The current mayor is Feyme Filiz Buluttekin. As Kaymakan was appointed Abdullah Çiftçi.

== Composition ==
There are 100 neighbourhoods in Sur District:

- Abdaldede
- Ağaçlıdere
- Alabal
- Alcık
- Alibardak
- Alipaşa
- Arpaderesi
- Bağıvar
- Bağpınar
- Bahçecik
- Baroğlu
- Beybulak
- Bostanpınar
- Bozdemir
- Büyükakören
- Büyükkadı
- Cami Kebir
- Cami Nebi
- Çarıklı
- Çataksu
- Çelikli
- Cemal Yılmaz
- Cevatpaşa
- Çubuklu
- Dabanoğlu
- Dervişhasan
- Doğanlı
- Doğuçanakçı
- Dumrul
- Erimli
- Eryolu
- Esenbağ
- Fatihpaşa
- Fetih
- Fidanlar
- Gencan
- Gölpınar
- Gültepe
- Hacıosmanköy
- Harmanlar
- Hasırlı
- Havacılar
- Hızırilyas
- İskenderpaşa
- Kabasakal
- Kapaklıpınar
- Karabaş
- Karaçalı
- Karacaören
- Karaçimen
- Kardeşler
- Karpuzlu
- Karpuztepe
- Kartaltepe
- Kavaklıbağ
- Kayayolu
- Kengerli
- Kervanpınar
- Kırmasırt
- Konacık
- Köprübaşı
- Köşk
- Koyungüden
- Kozan
- Küçükakören
- Küçükkadı
- Kumluçat
- Kumrucak
- Kuşburnu
- Kuşlukbağı
- Lalebey
- Melikahmet
- Mermer
- Mermeri
- Nefirtaş
- Özekli
- Pınardüzü
- Sağdıçlı
- Sapanca
- Sarıkamış
- Sarılar
- Sarıyazma
- Sati
- Savaş
- Sayarlar
- Soğanlı
- Süleyman Nazif
- Süngüler
- Tanoğlu
- Tezgeçer
- Yarımca
- Yenice
- Yenidoğan
- Yenievler
- Yeşilköy
- Yeşilli
- Yiğitçavuş
- Yukarıkılıçtaşı
- Ziya Gökalp
- Ziyaret

== Visitor attractions ==
Sur is a historic and cultural center. It features historic Diyarbakır houses, Diyarbakır Archaeological Museum, Cahit Sıtkı Tarancı Museum, East Syriac Rite St. Mary's Cathedral, Syriac Orthodox St. Mary Church, St. Giragos Armenian Church, Dicle Bridge, Deliler Inn, Hasan Pasha Inn, Hazreti Süleyman Mosque containing graves of 27 companions of Muhammad, Nebi Mosque, Sheikh Matar Mosque and its Four-legged Minaret, Great Mosque of Diyarbakır and Diyarbakır Fortress as well as caravanserais, madrasas, shadirvans and inscriptions of various historic periods.

== 2015 conflict and rebuilding of the district ==
In 2015, militants linked to the banned Kurdistan Workers' Party (PKK) entered Sur district, erected barricades and dug ditches in the streets. The local authority banned public gatherings and imposed a 24-hour curfew in Sur on the 11 December 2015, and the Turkish Army deployed about 200 troops of the Special Forces Command to conduct house-to-house searches. The conflict resulted in most residents abandoning their homes. Abandoned houses in various neighborhoods of Sur district were occupied by militants, and clashes between the PKK and Turkish Army and Special Forces continued until early 2016.

Amnesty International has estimated that 300,000 people were displaced by the conflict, and branded the government's response 'collective punishment'. International Crisis Group has estimated that around 1,700 people have been killed in the resulting conflict and estimates the number of displaced people at 350,000. Human Rights Watch criticized the Turkish government for 'blocking access for independent investigations into alleged mass abuses against civilians across southeast Turkey'.

Many houses were destroyed and registered historic buildings were seriously damaged. In March 2016, the government launched a project for the restoration of all the damaged historic structures and the rebuilding of destroyed houses in accordance of their original style. However, the project was criticized by the Turkish Union of Architects and Engineers Chambers, who claimed that the project would take “a defense-centered approach”, which would require the destruction of some historic structures.
