= Hasan Pasha Han, Diyarbakır =

Hasan Pasha Han
- Hasan Paşa Hanı
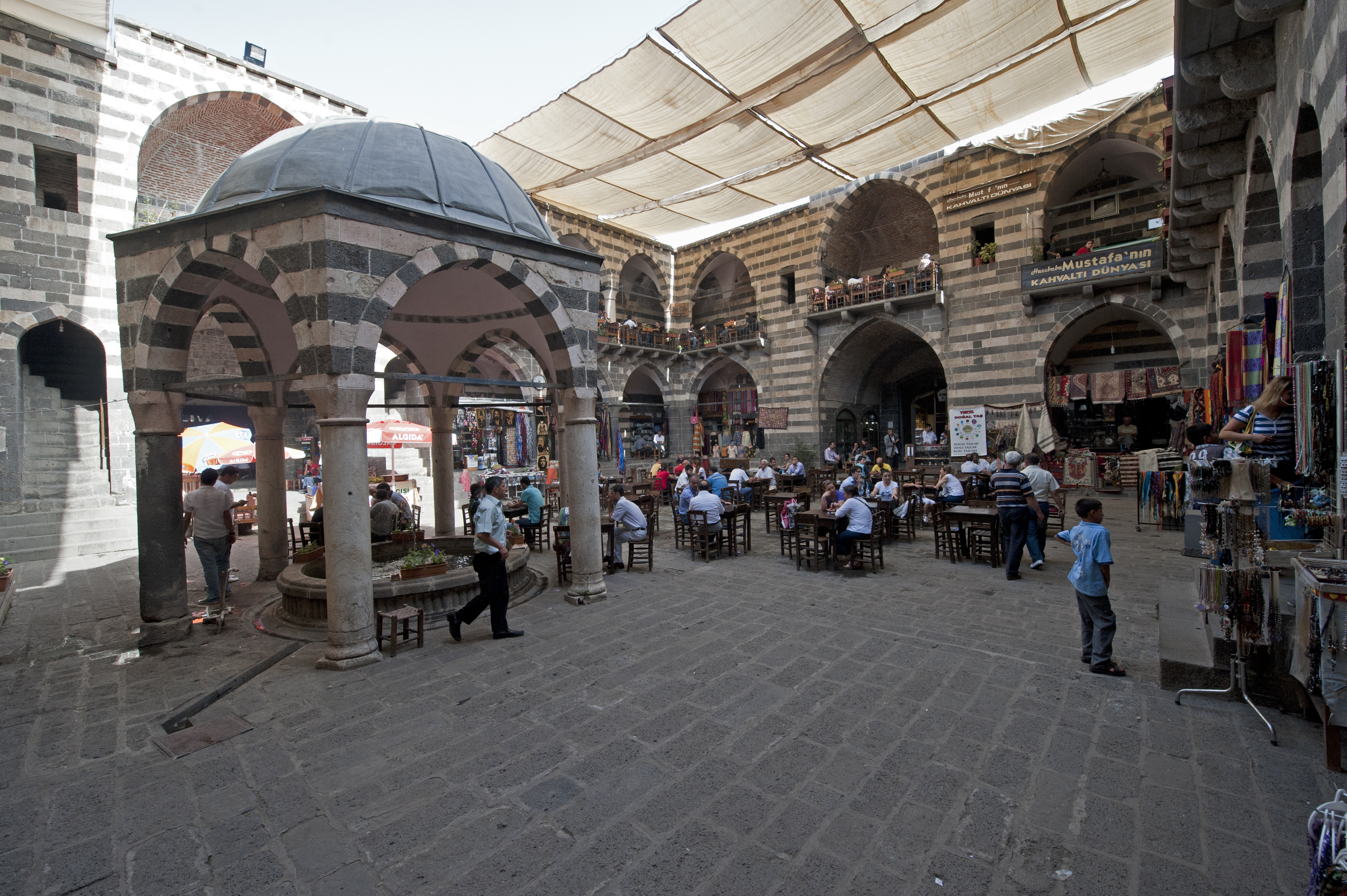
- Interactive map of the Hasan Pasha Han area

General information
- Type: Caravanserai
- Architectural style: Ottoman (mixed with local styles)
- Location: Diyarbakir, Turkey
- Coordinates: 37°54′45.8″N 40°14′13.8″E
- Named for: Hasan Pasha
- Completed: 1575

The Hasan Pasha Han (Turkish: Hasan Paşa Hanı) is a historic building and former caravanserai in Diyarbakır, Turkey. It is located near the center of the Sur district (the old walled city), across from the Great Mosque of Diyarbakır. It was built in the 16th century during the Ottoman period of the city. Along with the nearby Delliler Han to the south, it is one of the best preserved Ottoman caravanserais in eastern Turkey. Today the building hosts cafés and shops.

== History ==
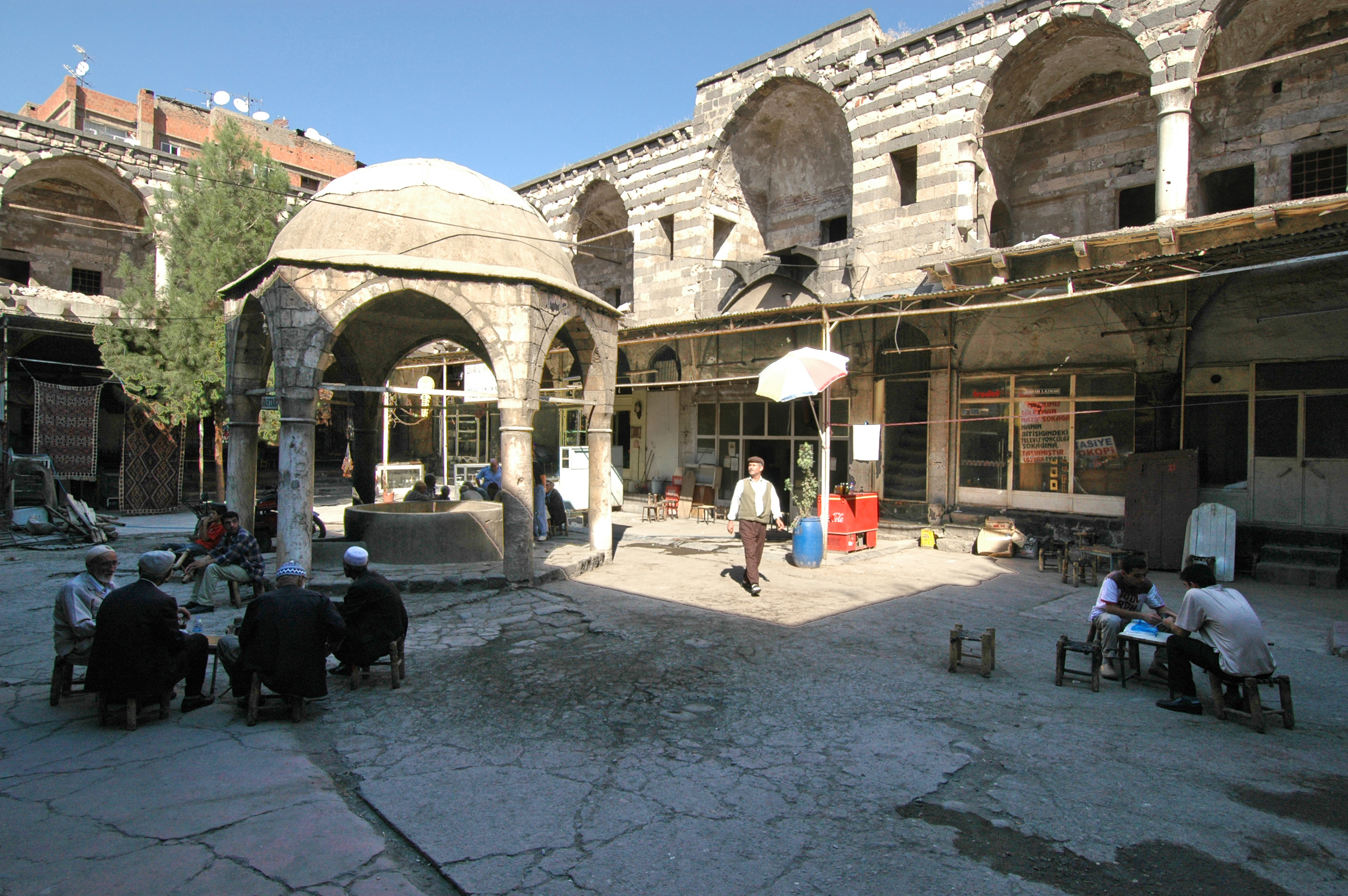
Interior of the han in 2005, prior to its recent restoration

The caravanserai (han in Turkish) was built from 1573 to 1575. Its construction was commissioned by Hasan Pasha, the oldest son of Sokollu Mehmet Pasha, the Ottoman grand vizier. The building was likely designed primarily to host shops and store goods, but historical sources attested that it also served as an inn that hosted travelers who were staying in the city overnight and that it could stable horses.

In 1613, it hosted the Polish traveler Simeon, who described the building and claimed it could house some 500 horses.

Following restoration work that began in 2006, the caravanserai now serves as a social meeting place that contains breakfast cafés, restaurants, and shops.

== Architecture ==
The walls of the building are built in alternating layers of light-coloured limestone and dark basalt in the local style. The building has an imposing street façade, especially on its west side, overlooking the main street. The façade design appears to be more sophisticated when compared with the older Delliler Han to the south, along the same street. The central entrances to the east and west are set inside deep recessed iwans. The outer corners of the entrance iwans are colonettes. The colonettes of the eastern portal are framed by muqarnas cornices that run vertically before turning inward above them, while the side walls of the iwan are marked by decorative muqarnas niches. Above the iwan on the west side is a decorative stonework panel as well as two windows inside recesses crowned by sharply-cut muqarnas and flanked by colonnettes. The style of these windows is reminiscent of monumental caravanserais in Aleppo and Damascus. Six windows pierce the façade on either side of the entrance, corresponding to the rooms inside.

Exterior façades

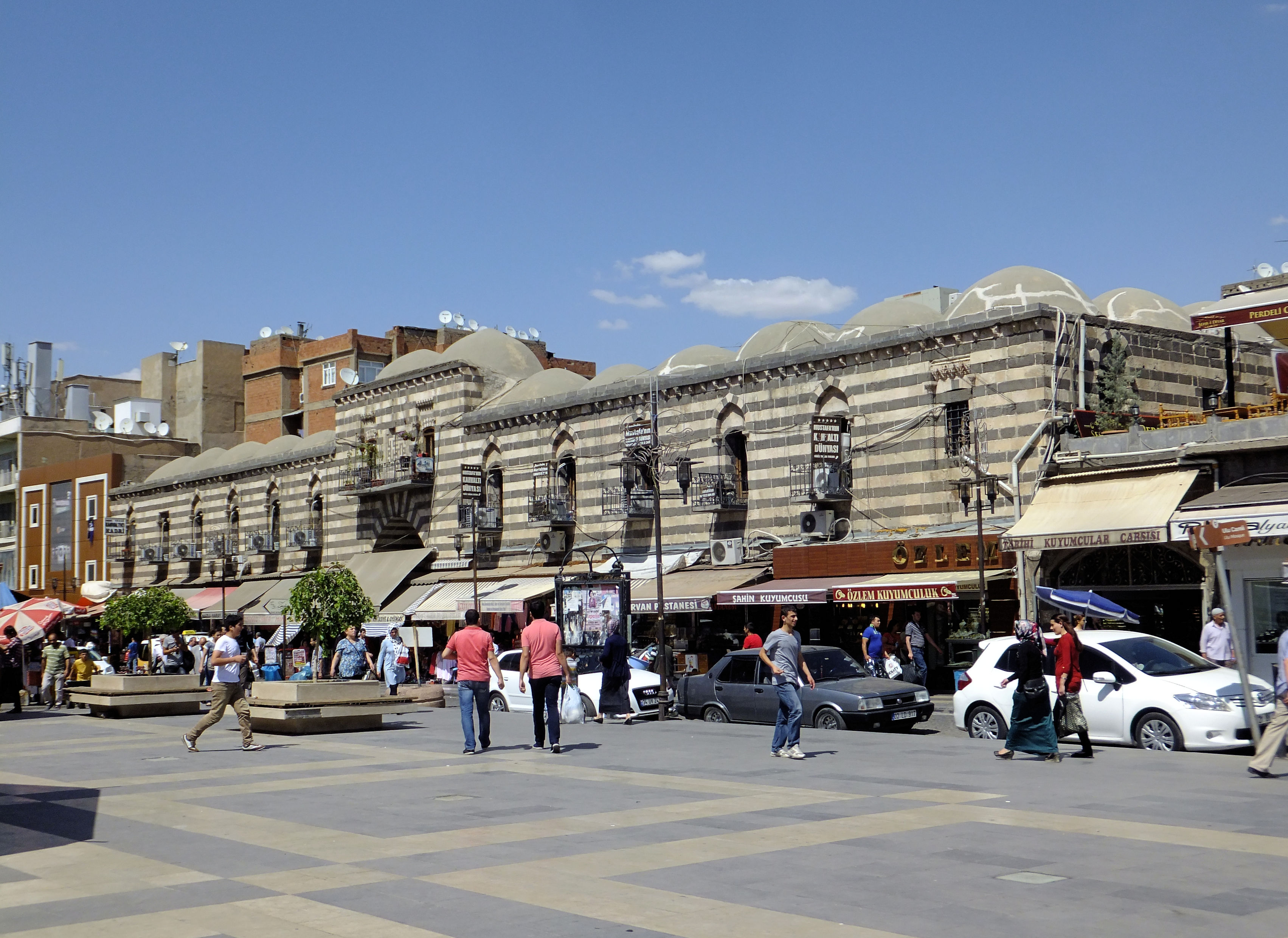
Western street façade

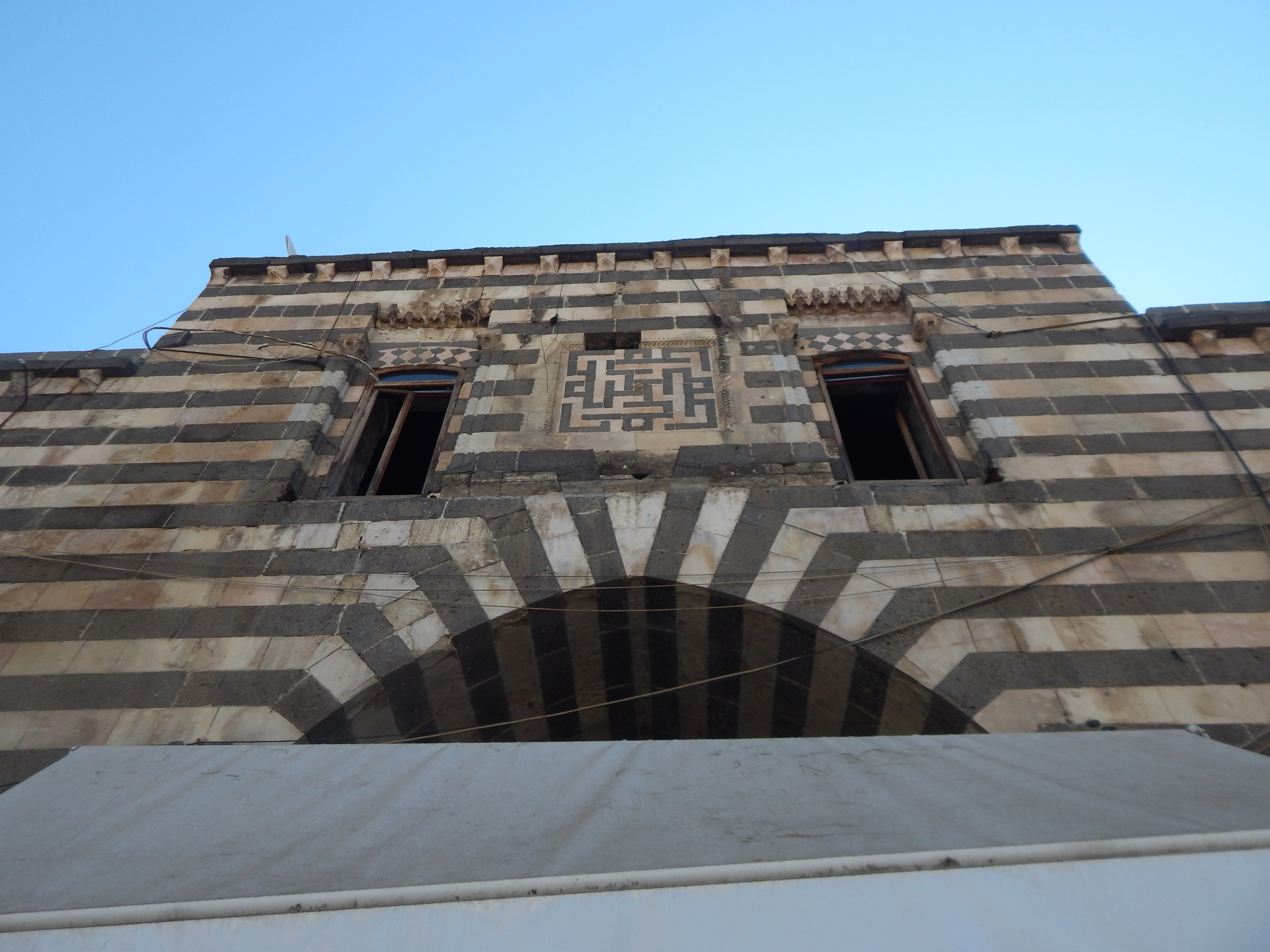
Detail of the decoration above the iwan of the western entrance

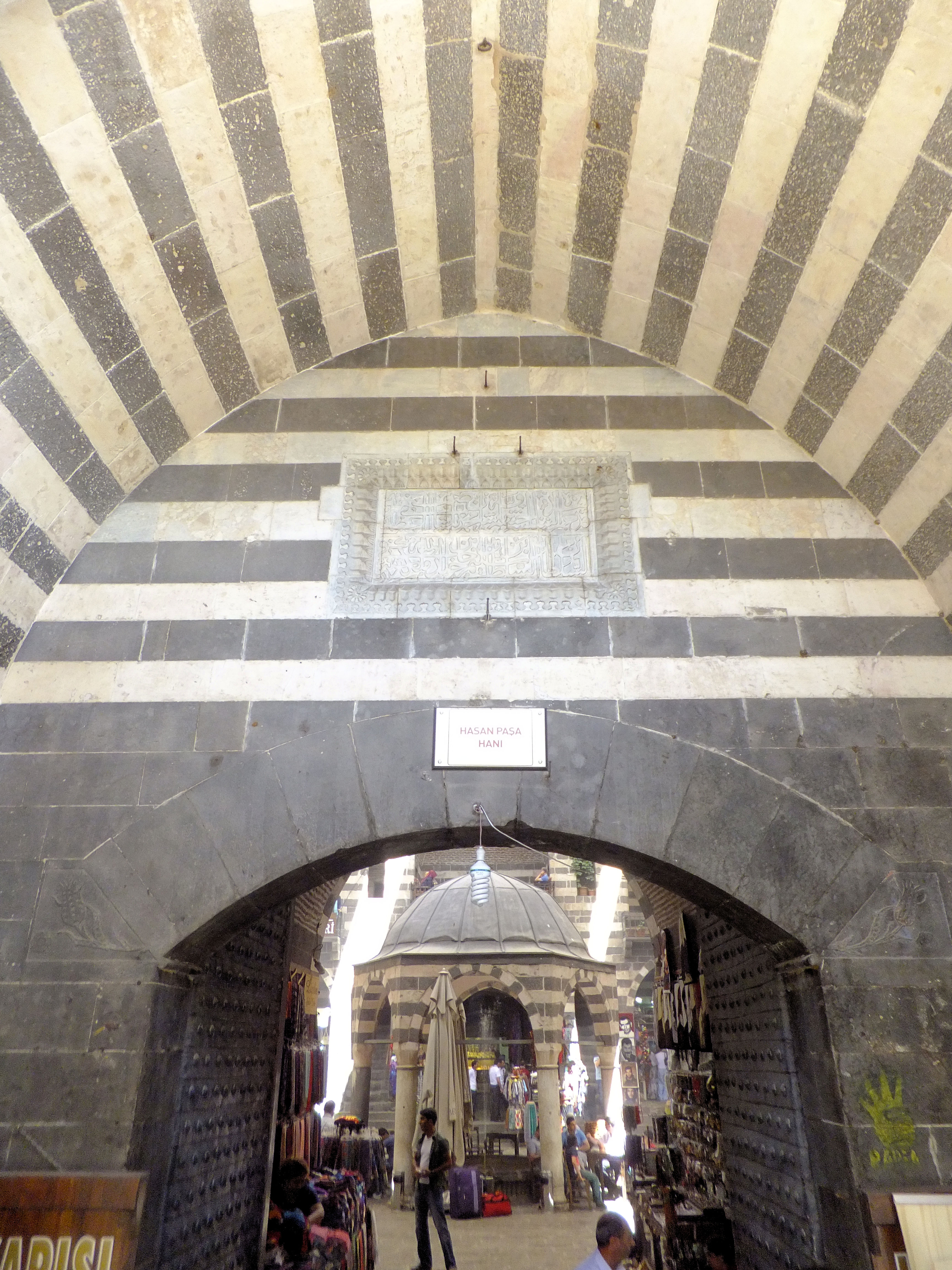
Inside the iwan (vaulted recess) of the western entrance

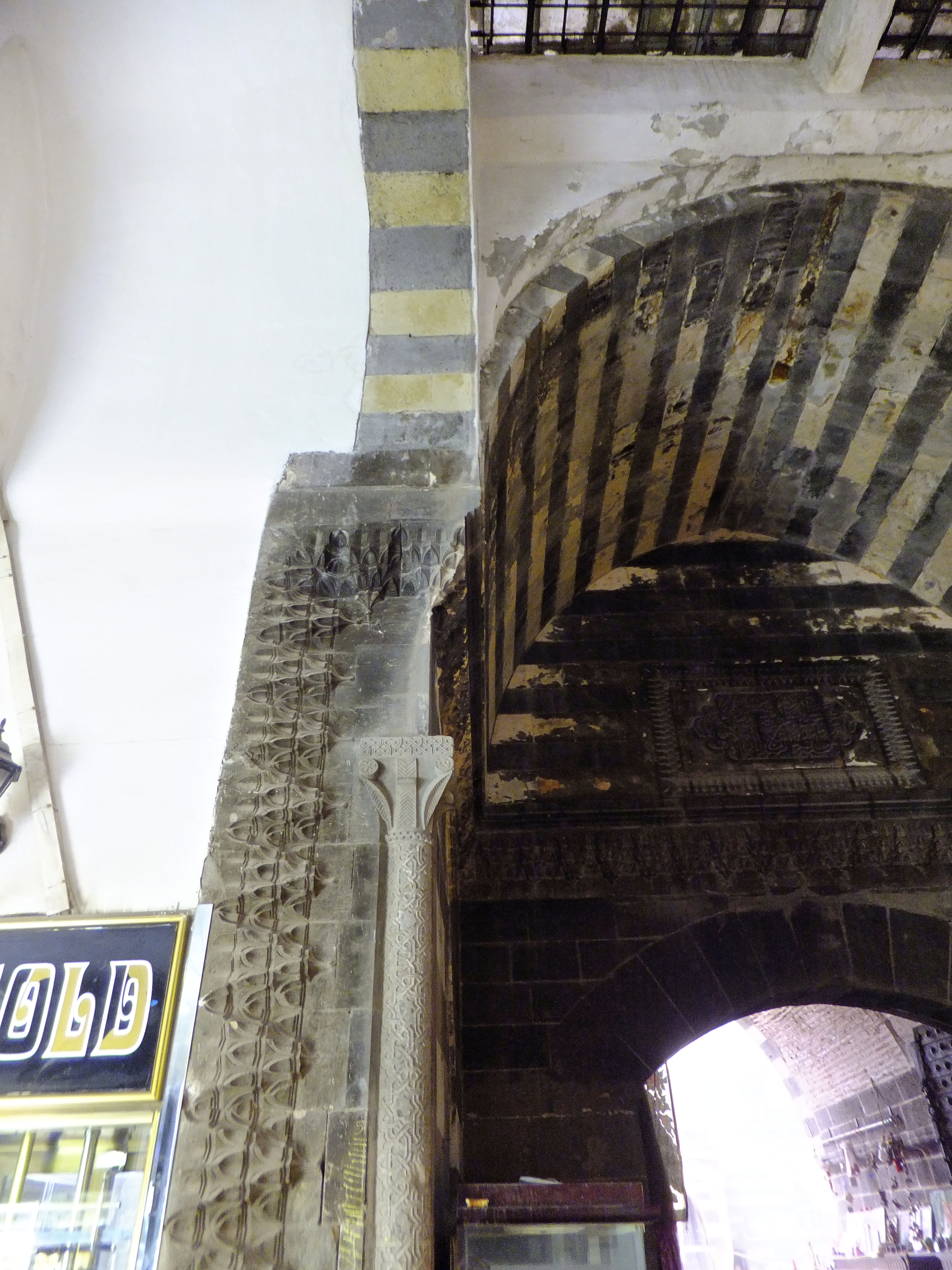
Decorative colonette and muqarnas around the eastern entrance portal

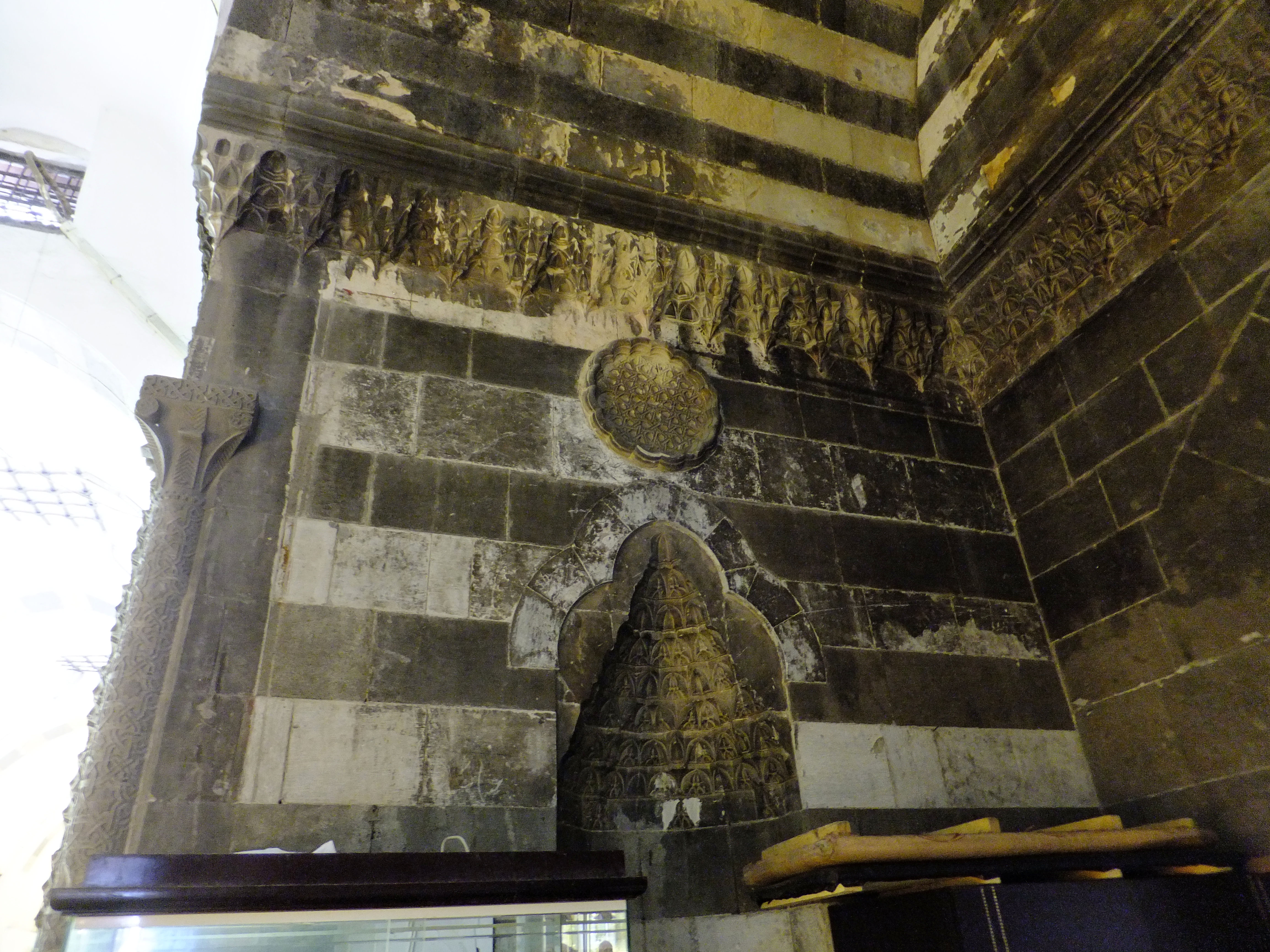
Muqarnas decoration inside the eastern entrance iwan

The building's interior is arranged around a large rectangular courtyard. In the center of this is a shadirvan with a dome resting on an octagonal configuration of eight columns. Around the edges of the courtyard runs a two-story gallery of broad arches supported by pillars. Behind the galleries are a series of rooms covered by domes or vaults. Both levels are now occupied by shops and cafés.

Interior

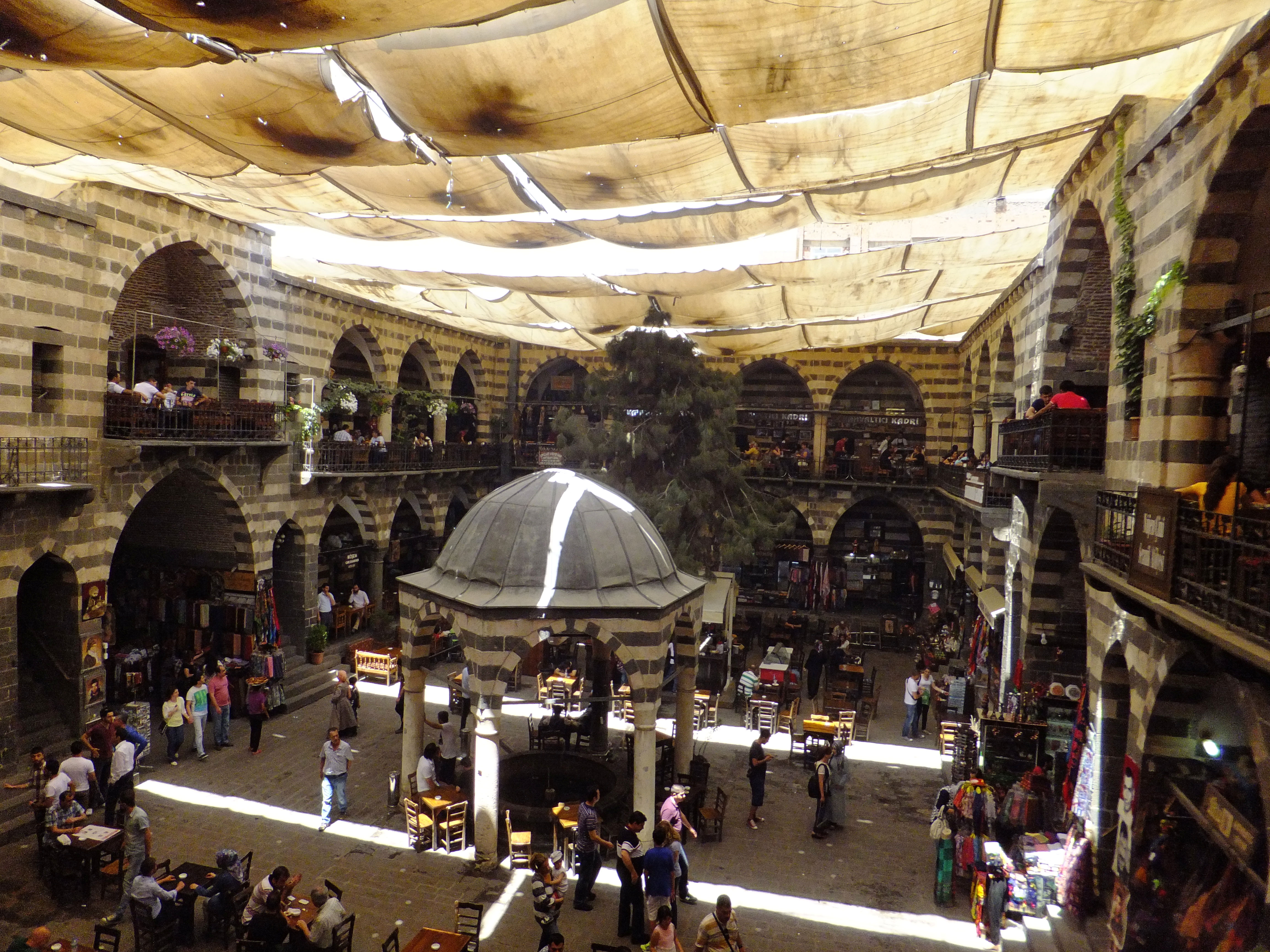
Interior courtyard, with the domed shadirvan in the center

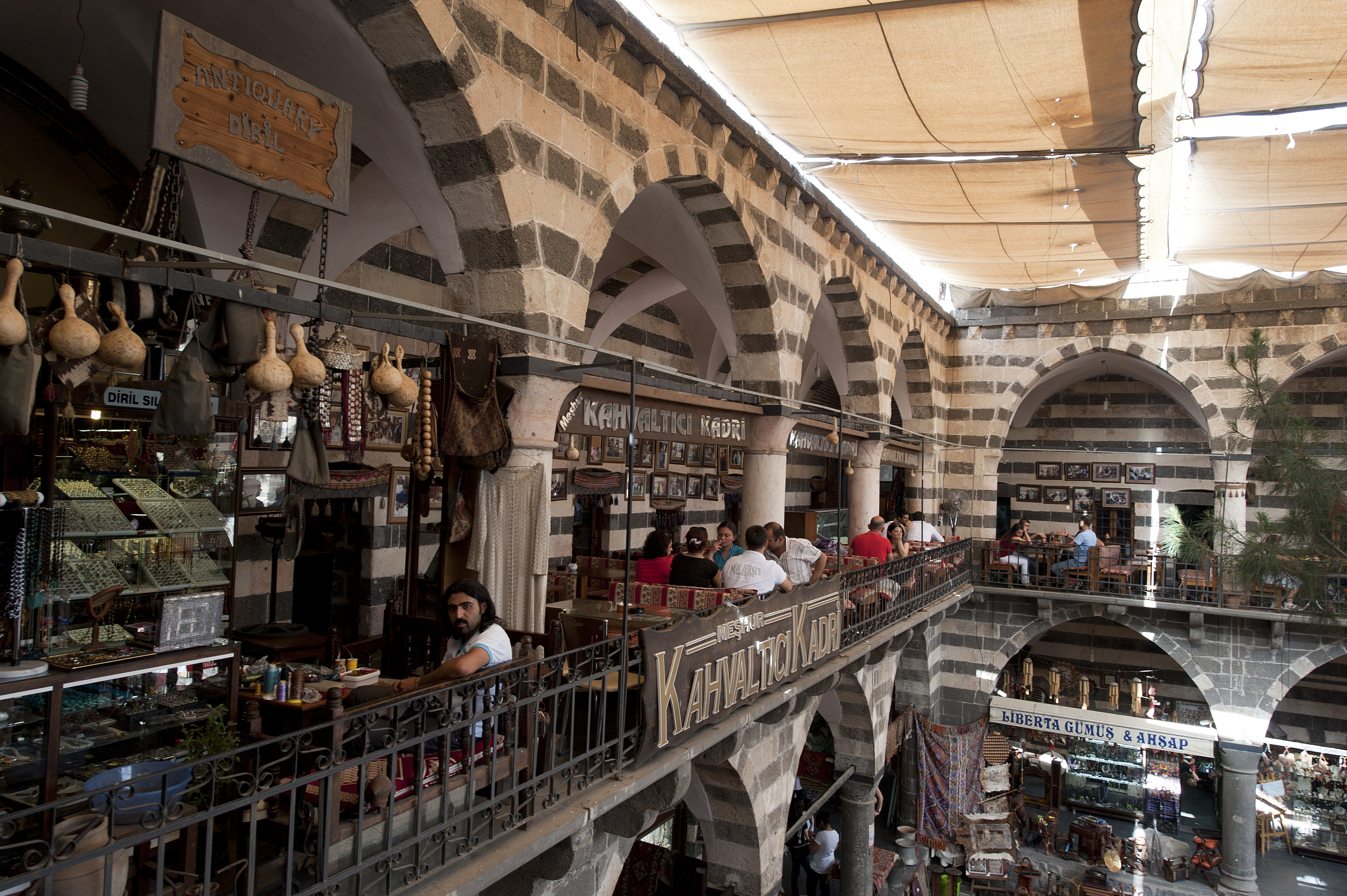
View of the upper floor gallery

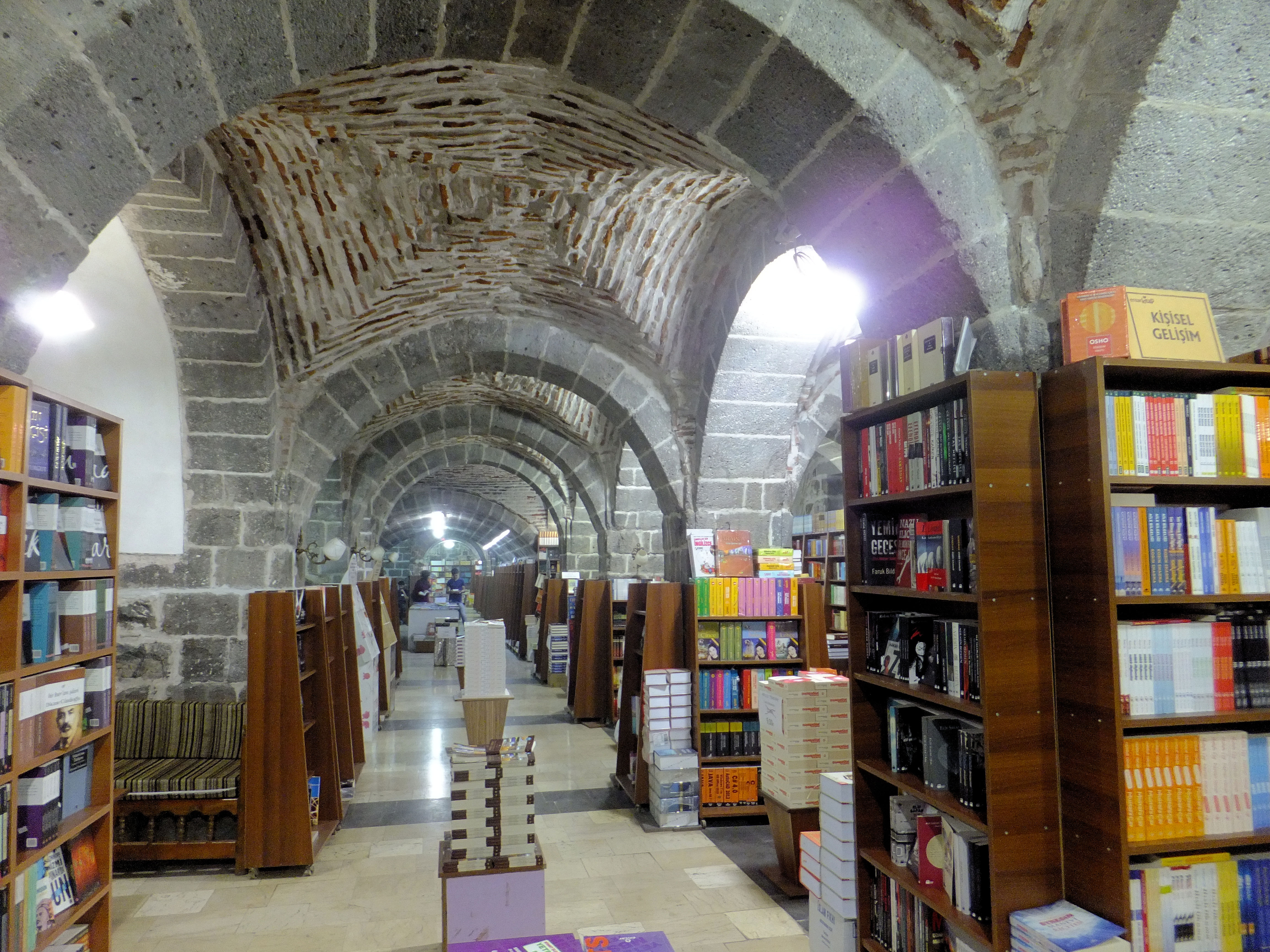
View of vaulted sub-level
