= Pınardüzü, Sur =

Pınardüzü
- Neighbourhood
- Location in Turkey
- Coordinates: 37.93983°N 40.37048°E
- Country: Turkey
- Province: Diyarbakır
- District: Sur
- Time zone: UTC+3 (TRT)

Pınardüzü (Note: Formerly known as Djernig, Jernig, Jevri, Cirnik, or Çirnik.) is a neighbourhood of the municipality and district of Sur, Diyarbakır Province, Turkey.

== History ==
Djernig (today called Pınardüzü) was historically inhabited by Armenians. There were 32 Armenian hearths in 1880. There was an Armenian church of Surb Astvatsatsin. It is tentatively identified with the village of Harnek, which was populated by 50 Syriacs in 1914, according to the list presented to the Paris Peace Conference by the Assyro-Chaldean delegation.

== Bibliography ==
- Gaunt, David (2006). Massacres, Resistance, Protectors: Muslim-Christian Relations in Eastern Anatolia during World War I. Gorgias Press.
- Jongerden, Joost; Verheij, Jelle, eds. (2012). Social Relations in Ottoman Diyarbekir, 1870-1915. Brill.
- Kévorkian, Raymond H. (2006). "Demographic Changes in the Armenian Population of Diarbekir, 1895-1914". In Richard G. Hovannisian (ed.). Armenian Tigranakert/Diarbekir and Edessa/Urfa. Mazda Publishers.
