= Kervanpınar, Sur =

Village in Turkey

Kervanpınar
- Neighbourhood
- Location in Turkey
- Coordinates: 37.82492°N 40.40547°E
- Country: Turkey
- Province: Diyarbakır
- District: Sur
- Time zone: UTC+3 (TRT)

Kervanpınar (Note: Also known as Kervanpınarı. Formerly known as Arzoghlou, Arzoghla, Arzoghlu, Arzi-Oghlou, Arzi-Oglou, Arz ogli, Arzu-Oghli, Arzioğlu, Arzıoğlu, or Orzuoğlu.) is a neighbourhood in the municipality and district of Sur, Diyarbakır Province in Turkey.

== History ==
Arzoghlou (today called Kervanpınar) was historically inhabited by Armenians and Syriac Orthodox Christians. The village was pillaged during the Massacres of Diyarbekir (1895). It was located in the Diyarbakır central district (merkez kaza) in the Diyarbakır sanjak in the Diyarbekir vilayet in c. 1900. In 1914, it was inhabited by 100 Syriacs, according to the list presented to the Paris Peace Conference by the Assyro-Chaldean delegation.

== Bibliography ==
- Abed Mshiho Neman of Qarabash (2021) [1918]. Sayfo – An Account of the Assyrian Genocide. Translated by Michael Abdalla; Łukasz Kiczko. Edinburgh University Press.
- Courtois, Sébastien de (2004). The Forgotten Genocide: Eastern Christians, The Last Arameans. Translated by Vincent Aurora. Gorgias Press.
- Gaunt, David (2006). Massacres, Resistance, Protectors: Muslim-Christian Relations in Eastern Anatolia during World War I. Gorgias Press.
- Jongerden, Joost; Verheij, Jelle, eds. (2012). Social Relations in Ottoman Diyarbekir, 1870-1915. Brill.
- Kévorkian, Raymond H. (2006). "Demographic Changes in the Armenian Population of Diarbekir, 1895-1914". In Richard G. Hovannisian (ed.). Armenian Tigranakert/Diarbekir and Edessa/Urfa. Mazda Publishers.
