= Küçükakören, Sur =

Village in Turkey

Küçükakören
- Neighbourhood
- Location in Turkey
- Coordinates: 38°10′23″N 40°21′45″E
- Country: Turkey
- Province: Diyarbakır
- District: Sur
- Population (2022): 1,984
- Time zone: UTC+3 (TRT)

Küçükakören is a neighbourhood in the municipality and district of Sur, Diyarbakır Province in Turkey. Its population is 1,984 (2022).
