= Alibardak, Sur =

Village in Turkey

Alibardak
- Neighbourhood
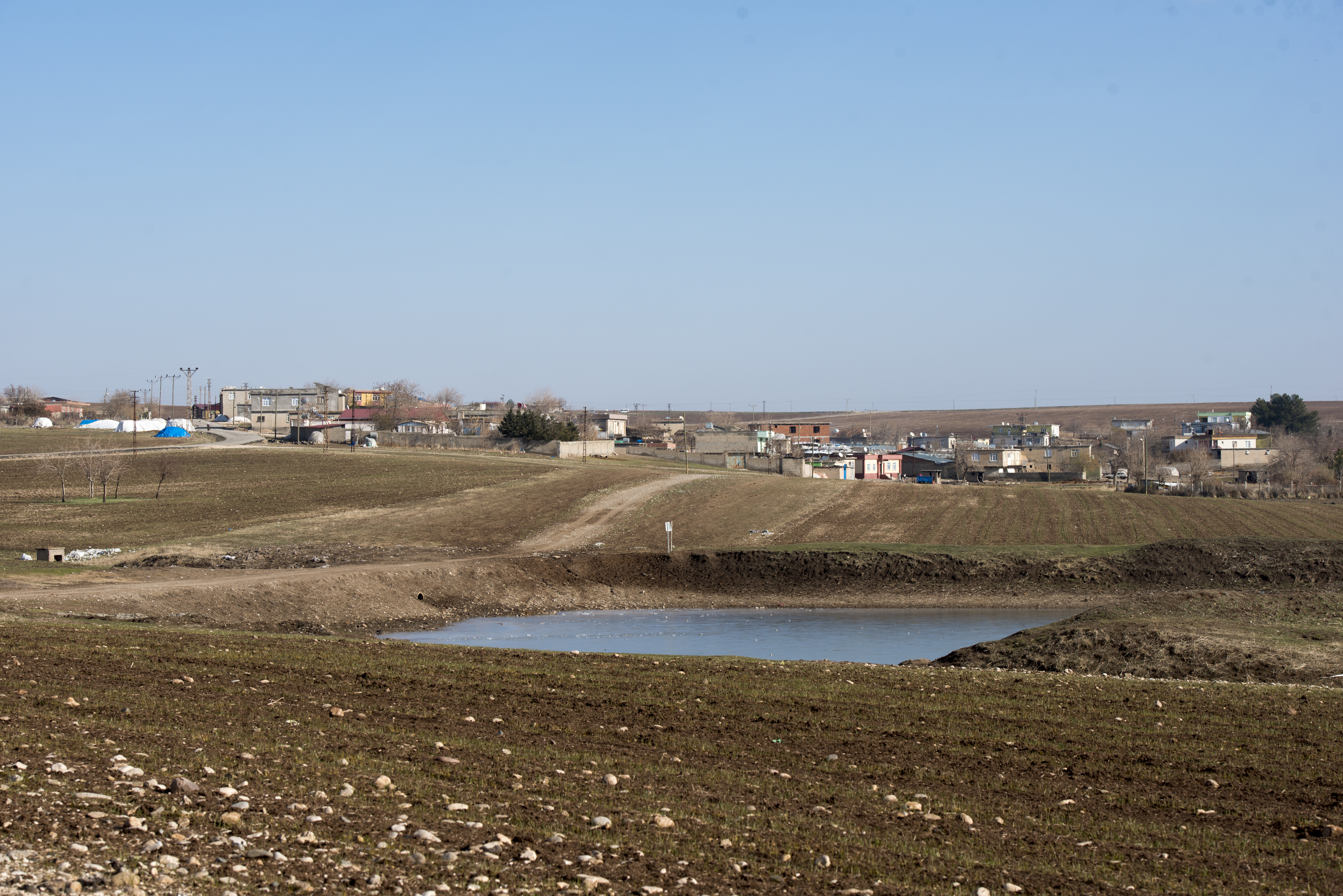

- Location within Turkey
- Coordinates: 38°06′N 40°25′E
- Country: Turkey
- Province: Diyarbakır
- District: Sur
- Population (2022): 561
- Time zone: UTC+3 (TRT)

Alibardak is a neighbourhood in the municipality and district of Sur, Diyarbakır Province in Turkey. Its population is 561 (2022).
