= Çelikli, Sur =

Village in Turkey

Çelikli
- Neighbourhood
- Country: Turkey
- Province: Diyarbakır
- District: Sur
- Population (2022): 447
- Time zone: UTC+3 (TRT)

Çelikli is a neighbourhood in the municipality and district of Sur, Diyarbakır Province in Turkey. Its population was 447 (as of 2022).
