= Mermer, Sur =

Village in Turkey

Mermer
- Neighbourhood
- Location in Turkey
- Coordinates: 38°07′30″N 40°27′04″E
- Country: Turkey
- Province: Diyarbakır
- District: Sur
- Population (2022): 1,257
- Time zone: UTC+3 (TRT)

Mermer is a neighbourhood in the municipality and district of Sur, Diyarbakır Province in Turkey. Its population is 1,257 (2022).
