= Arpaderesi, Sur =

Village in Turkey

Arpaderesi
- Neighbourhood
- Location in Turkey
- Coordinates: 38.1633°N 40.4786°E
- Country: Turkey
- Province: Diyarbakır
- District: Sur
- Population (2022): 140
- Time zone: UTC+3 (TRT)

Arpaderesi is a neighbourhood in the municipality and district of Sur, Diyarbakır Province in Turkey. Its population is 140 (2022).
