= Kangrali (BK) =

- town
- Location in Karnataka, India
- Coordinates: 15.9°N 74.5°E
- Country: India
- State: Karnataka
- District: Belgaum
- Talukas: Belgaum

Population (2011)
  - Total: 10,084

Languages
  - Official: Kannada
- Time zone: UTC+5:30 (IST)

Kangrali (BK) is a census town in Belgaum district in the Indian state of Karnataka.

== Demographics ==
As of 2011 India census, Kangrali (BK) had a population of 10,084. Males constitute 51% of the population and females 49%. Kangrali (BK) has an average literacy rate of 67%, higher than the national average of 59.5%: male literacy is 76%, and female literacy is 57%. In Kangrali (BK), 14% of the population is under 6 years of age.
