= Kengerli, Sur =

Village in Turkey

Kengerli
- Neighbourhood
- Country: Turkey
- Province: Diyarbakır
- District: Sur
- Population (2022): 151
- Time zone: UTC+3 (TRT)

Kengerli is a neighbourhood in the municipality and district of Sur, Diyarbakir Province in Turkey. Its population is 151 (2022).
