= Kangrali (KH) =

- Town
- Nickname: small kangrali
- Location in Karnataka, India
- Coordinates: 15.89°N 74.5°E
- Country: India
- State: Karnataka
- District: Belgaum
- Talukas: Belgaum

Population (2001)
  - Total: 9,671

Languages
  - Official: Marathi
- Time zone: UTC+5:30 (IST)

Kangrali (KH) is a census town in Belgaum district in the Indian state of Karnataka.

== Demographics ==
As of October 2011 India census, Kangrali (KH) had a population of 9,671. Males constitute 51% of the population and females 49%. Kangrali (KH) has an average literacy rate of 73%, higher than the national average of 59.5%: male literacy is 79%, and female literacy is 67%. In Kangrali (KH), 14% of the population is under 6 years of age.
