= Bala Kəngərli, Kurdamir =

Bala Kəngərli
- Municipality
- Location within Azerbaijan
- Coordinates: 40°27′05″N 48°16′34″E
- Country: Azerbaijan
- Rayon: Kurdamir
- Time zone: UTC+4 (AZT)
  - Summer (DST): UTC+5 (AZT)

Bala Kəngərli (or Bala Kengerli) is a village and municipality in the Kurdamir Rayon of Azerbaijan.
