= Karabaş, Sur =

Village in Turkey

Karabaş
- Neighbourhood
- Location in Turkey
- Coordinates: 37.92883°N 40.31909°E
- Country: Turkey
- Province: Diyarbakır
- District: Sur
- Time zone: UTC+3 (TRT)

Karabaş (Armenian: Գարապաշ; Syriac: Qarābāš) (Note: Also known as Karabach, Kara-Bach, Kara-Bakh, Karabash, Kuabash, Kurabash, Qarabach, Qara Bash, Qarabash, or Qarabâsh.) is a neighbourhood in the municipality and district of Sur, Diyarbakır Province in Turkey.

== History ==
Qarābāš (today called Karabaş) was historically inhabited by Syriac Orthodox Christians and Armenians. One priest was ordained for the Syriac Orthodox Church of Morī Qawmah at Qarābāš in 1585 (AG 1896). In 1628 (AG 1939), one priest was ordained for the Church of Morī Qawmah. One deacon was ordained for the Church of Morī Qawmah in 1631 (AG 1942). In the Syriac Orthodox patriarchal register of dues of 1870, it was recorded that the village had 34 households, who paid 40 dues, and was served by the Church of Morī Qawmī and one priest. Malkī Qarābāš donated 35 piastres for the reconstruction of the Mor Hananyo Monastery in 1872. In 1880, there were 8 Armenian hearths. There was an Armenian church of Surb Simon. The village was renowned throughout the region for the breeding of pigeons which were sold at Diyarbakır.

By 1895, the village was populated by over 1000 people. It was mostly inhabited by Syriacs with a few Armenian families. On 1 November 1895, Qarābāš was attacked by Kurds during the massacres in the Diyarbekir vilayet. (Note: Gaunt erroneously places the attack on 1 October 1895.) Over two days, the Kurds pillaged and burned the village and murdered the villagers. A significant number of villagers who had taken refuge inside a tall tower used for breeding pigeons were slaughtered and the tower was destroyed, burying the villagers under the rubble. Some villagers escaped to Diyarbakır or neighbouring villages. After a short while, some of the survivors returned to Qarābāš and rebuilt the village.

It was located in the Diyarbakır central district (merkez kaza) in the Diyarbakır sanjak in the Diyarbekir vilayet in c. 1900. In 1914, it was inhabited by 600 Syriacs, according to the list presented to the Paris Peace Conference by the Assyro-Chaldean delegation. On 18 February 1915, 12 young Syriac men from Qarābāš were sentenced to death by firing squad for desertion. After having been forcibly conscripted, they had fled from Diyarbakır and hidden at Takhta Kala nearby. The court official instead wrote Chanak-Kale, a fortress along the Dardanelles, so to suggest that the young men had deserted as opposed to evading conscription. They were publicly executed in major towns across the region to serve as an example; two were executed in Mardin, two in Al-Madine, two in Harpoot, two in Urfa, and four in Diyarbakır.

Amidst the Sayfo, on 20 April 1915, 50 soldiers from an Al-Khamsin detachment and two officers, Yihia Yasin Agha and Sidqi Pirinjichi, surrounded and disarmed the village and seized a number of men who were then imprisoned at the caravanserai named Misafir-Khane (House of the Traveller) at Diyarbakır. (Note: Gaunt states that 20 men were taken on 20 April whilst Abed Mshiho Neman of Qarabash gives 200.) After five days, the men were told that they were going to be taken to Chabakchur to build roads, but, after a seven-hour-long march, they were stripped and killed near the village of Sharabi and their bodies were thrown into the Tigris. On 22 April, at midnight, Yihia Yasin Agha and Sidqi Pirinjichi and 50 soldiers seized all of the remaining men in the village, including the elderly, under the pretence that they were going to construct roads and they were killed en route to Diyarbakır. On 23 April, the village was plundered by Kurds who killed the priest Behnam and many of the women and children. Some villagers who attempted to take refuge in other villages were hunted and killed whilst a number of survivors were smuggled to safety at Diyarbakır in small groups by an army officer named Ibrahim and a Kurdish shepherd called Haji Mustafa.

Half of a group of over 400 Armenian children between the ages of one and three were taken to Qarābāš during the Armenian genocide and hacked to pieces and fed to dogs. Qarābāš was resettled by the Turkish authorities with Muslim Bulgarian refugees soon after the massacres. The last four Syriac families left the village for Qamishli in Syria in 1948.

== Bibliography ==
- Abed Mshiho Neman of Qarabash (2021) [1918]. Sayfo – An Account of the Assyrian Genocide. Translated by Michael Abdalla; Łukasz Kiczko. Edinburgh University Press.
- Bablumyan, Arpine (2022). "ԴԻԱՐԲԵՔԻՐԻ ՆԱՀԱՆԳԻ ՀԱՅ ԲՆԱԿՉՈՒԹՅԱՆ ԿՈՏՈՐԱԾՆԵՐԸ 1915 Թ." Armenological Issues (in Armenian). 2 (26): 76–93.
- Barsoum, Aphrem (2008). The History of Tur Abdin. Translated by Matti Moosa. Gorgias Press.
- Bcheiry, Iskandar (2009). The Syriac Orthodox Patriarchal Register of Dues of 1870: An Unpublished Historical Document from the Late Ottoman Period. Gorgias Press.
- Bcheiry, Iskandar (2010a). A List of Syriac Orthodox Ecclesiastic Ordinations from the Sixteenth and Seventeenth Century: The Syriac Manuscript of Hunt 444 (Syr 68 in Bodleian Library, Oxford). Gorgias Press.
- Bcheiry, Iskandar (2010b). Collection of Historical Documents in Relation with the Syriac Orthodox Community in the Late Period of the Ottoman Empire: The Register of Mardin MS 1006. Gorgias Press.
- Courtois, Sébastien de (2004). The Forgotten Genocide: Eastern Christians, The Last Arameans. Translated by Vincent Aurora. Gorgias Press.
- Gaunt, David (2006). Massacres, Resistance, Protectors: Muslim-Christian Relations in Eastern Anatolia during World War I. Gorgias Press.
- Jongerden, Joost; Verheij, Jelle, eds. (2012). Social Relations in Ottoman Diyarbekir, 1870-1915. Brill.
- Kévorkian, Raymond H. (2006). "Demographic Changes in the Armenian Population of Diarbekir, 1895-1914". In Richard G. Hovannisian (ed.). Armenian Tigranakert/Diarbekir and Edessa/Urfa. Mazda Publishers.
- Kévorkian, Raymond (2011). The Armenian Genocide: A Complete History. I.B. Tauris.
- Yacoub, Joseph (2016). Year of the Sword: The Assyrian Christian Genocide, A History. Translated by James Ferguson. Oxford University Press.
