= Bala Kəngərli, Tartar =

Bala Kəngərli
- Municipality
- Location within Azerbaijan Location within Karabakh Economic Region
- Coordinates: 40°23′N 46°57′E
- Country: Azerbaijan
- Rayon: Tartar

Population
  - Total: 560
- Time zone: UTC+4 (AZT)
  - Summer (DST): UTC+5 (AZT)

Bala Kəngərli (also, Balakəngərli, Bala Kengerli and Bala-Kengerly) is a village and municipality in the Tartar Rayon of Azerbaijan. It has a population of 560.
