= Mehmet Kengerli =

- Born: 1 October 1914; Shusha, Azerbaijan
- Died: 17 September 2006 (aged 91); Ankara, Turkey
- Citizenship: Azerbaijan Democratic Republic; Soviet Union; Turkey

Mehmet Kengerli (1 October 1914 - 17 September 2006) was the head of the Azerbaijan National Center for Immigrants and personal doctor of Mammad Amin Rasulzadeh. He became a member of the Young Azer Organization of the Musavat party at age 14. In 1939 he took part in the Winter War. Later, he was captured by the Germans in World War II and served as a military doctor in the Azerbaijani Legion.

== Early life ==
Mehmet Kengerli was born on January 10, 1914, in Shusha. In 1928, he became a member of the Young Azer Organization of the Musavat party. After graduating from high school, he entered the Russian department of the Medical Faculty of the university in 1933, and then entered the Leningrad Military Academy, from which he graduated in 1939.

== Career ==
He served as a military doctor in the USSR-Finland war. Together with the medical battalion, he was captured by the Finns. A year later, in a prisoner exchange, he was returned to the Soviet army.

In 1942 he was captured by the Germans in World War II. After his capture, he worked as a military doctor in the Azerbaijani Legion. Kengerli lived in difficult conditions in Germany after World War II.

He moved to Turkey in 1952 and worked at the Azerbaijan National Center in Ankara and the Azerbaijan Cultural Association. He married in 1954. From 1952 to 1979, he worked as a chief physician, head of health, assistant director general of the Red Crescent in hospitals of the Turkish Ministry of Health and Social Welfare, and as a counselor at the Turkish Embassy in Bonn.

In 1963, he went to Cyprus and established the Red Crescent Hospital there. In 1971, he was sent to the Indian war zone on behalf of the Red Crescent during the Kashmir war between India and Pakistan. He was repeatedly awarded medals of honor for his work there. He later worked as the head of the Monuments Circle in Turkey. During his lifetime, Azerbaijan magazine published his articles on the national struggle. He died on August 17, 2006, in Ankara.

== See also ==
- Azerbaijani Legion
- Mammad Amin Rasulzadeh
