= Gəncəli =

Ganjali or Genjeli may refer to:

- Ganjali, Khachmaz, Azerbaijan
- Ganjali, Salyan, Azerbaijan
- Genjeli, Chermik, Turkey
