= Basari =

Basari may refer to:

- Basari, Iran (disambiguation)
- Basari language (disambiguation)
- Başarı, Çermik
- Başarı, Kemaliye
