= Kalecik =

Kalecik may refer to:

== Places ==
- Kalecik, Ankara in Turkey
- Kalecik, Çermik
- Kalecik, Eğil
- Kalecik, Erzincan
- Kalecik, Hınıs
- Kalecik, Karakoçan
- Kalecik, Mecitözü
- Kalecik, Tercan
- Kalecik Dam (Elazığ), a dam in Elazığ Province of Turkey
- Kalecik Dam (Osmaniye), a dam in Osmaniye Province of Turkey
- Gastria, Cyprus, called Kalecik in Northern Cyprus

== Others ==
- Kalecik Karası, a Turkish grape variety
