= Kalecik Dam =

Kalecik Dam may refer to:

- Kalecik Dam (Elazığ)
- Kalecik Dam (Osmaniye)
