= Sarıca =

Sarıca may refer to:

== Places ==
Azerbaijan

- Sarıca, Azerbaijan

Turkey

- Sarıca, İvrindi, Balıkesir Province
- Sarıca, Biga, Çanakkale Province
- Sarıca, Çermik, Diyarbakır Province
- Sarıca, Eğil, Diyarbakır Province
- Sarıca, Kastamonu, Kastamonu Province

== People ==
- Ayşegül Sarıca (born 1935), Turkish pianist
- Didem Sarıca (born 1977), Turkish basketball player
- Ufuk Sarıca (born 1972), Turkish basketball coach
