= Bayrak (disambiguation) =

Bayrak is a Turkish word meaning "flag", and it may refer to:

- Bayrak (surname)
- Bayrak, the official radio and television broadcasting corporation of the self-proclaimed 'Turkish Republic of Northern Cyprus'
- Bajrak, former political entity in the Gheg-inhabited northern Albanian territories
- Al Bayrak, Lebanese daily newspaper from 1911 until 2011
- Bayrak, Çermik

== See also ==
- Bajraku (peak)
- Bairak (disambiguation)
- Bayrock (disambiguation)
