= Babalı =

Babalı or Babaly may refer to:

- Babalı, Jalilabad, Azerbaijan
- Babalı, Khachmaz, Azerbaijan
