= İncili =

İncili can refer to:

- İncili, Aydıntepe
- İncili Çavuş
- İncili, Çermik
