= Çukurelma =

Çukurelma can refer to:

- Çukurelma, Çermik
- Çukurelma, Elmalı
