= Kömürcüler =

Kömürcüler can refer to:

- Kömürcüler, Çermik
- Kömürcüler, Döşemealtı
