= Bani Sakhr =

Tribal confederacy in Jordan

Banu Sakhr
- Bedouin
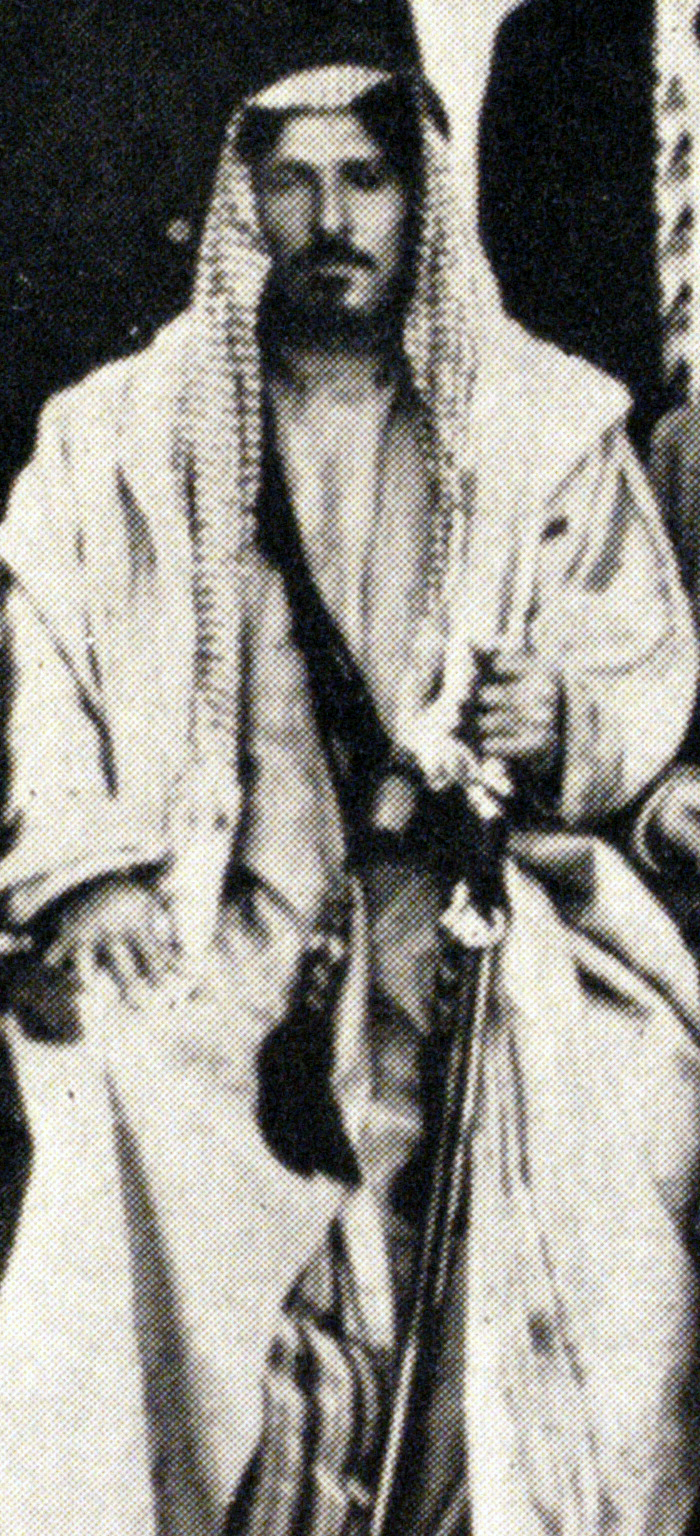
- A Sakhr chief, Sheikh Mithqal Pasha Al-Fayez, Jerusalem, 1933
- Location: Central and eastern Jordan
- Branches: Tuwaqa; Fayez; Ka'abna; Khuraysha
- Religion: Islam

The Bani Sakhr confederacy is one of the largest and most influential tribal confederacies in Jordan. The Bani Sakhr began migrating to the Levant from the Hejaz as early as the 16th century and their influence continued growing until they became the most powerful tribe in northwestern Arabia around the mid-18th century.

The Bani Sakhr is made up of many clans, both through ancestry and alliances. These clans are primarily separated into three groups: the Al-Twaqa, headed by the princely Al-Fayez family; the Al-Ka'abneh, headed by the Khreisha family; and the Al-Khdeir.

== Tribal area and mode of living ==
The Banu Sakhr were historically a fully Bedouin (nomadic), camel-raising tribe. By the start of the 19th century, their dira' (tribal territory) spanned much of the area that would constitute central Jordan, with summergrounds down the length of the Balqa highlands from the area around Amman in the north to the area around Karak in the south. Their wintergrounds extended east of this region toward the Wadi Sirhan, where the modern eastern border of Jordan with Saudi Arabia is formed.

From at least the 18th century, the tribesmen made their living from raising camels, collecting tribute known as khuwwa (lit. 'brotherhood') from the townspeople of Salt and Karak, and from the annual Mecca-bound Hajj caravans marshalled in Damascus which passed through their territory. From the Hajj pilgrims, they collected payments for supplying camels and desert guides and from the authorities they collected dues for ensuring the caravan's protection through their territory. Starting in the mid-to-late 19th century, the sheikhs (chiefs) of the Sakhr began to register ownership of the lands they long dominated with the government and became large-scale landowners. Rather than take up a settled life as farmers, the Sakhr preserved their nomadic Bedouin lifestyle by using their landownership to form plantation enterprises, entering sharecropping agreements with peasants who cultivated their lands and shared with the sheikhs a portion of the harvests. As late as the 1930s, the Sakhr maintained their seasonal migrations, wintering with their camelherds deep into the desert, while maintaining control of their cultivable lands in western Jordan. The majority of the tribesmen continued to live in traditional goat-hair tents in the 1950s, with less than a fifth living in stone or wooden houses.

== History ==
=== Origins and early history (14th–early 18th centuries) ===
A tribe by the name 'Banu Sakhr' is recorded by the Mamluk historians Ibn Fadlallah al-Umari (d. 1341) and al-Qalqashandi (d. 1418) as inhabiting the plateaus in the eastern part of Karak province (southern Transjordan). These historians affiliated the tribe with the Judham, a tribe that dominated the region during the early Islamic period, and the Qahtan, the ancestor of the 'southern Arabs' in the Arab geneaoligical tradition. The Sakhr were divided into six subgroups: the Da'jiyyun, Banu Shaja', al-Dabiyyun, al-Atwiyyun, Banu Wahran and Banu Hubir. Ottoman tax registers for the district of Jabal Ajlun record the Banu Sakhr tribe in the 16th century. The tribe consisted of twelve subgroups, each with a sheikh (chief), totaling 643 households and 34 bachelors. The tribe was taxed 38,000 akces-worth in livestock (idat tax) in the 1530s. The tribe was deemed to be rebelling against the state in 1551 in conjunction with the Bedouin Turabay emirs of Lajjun in northern Palestine. The Sakhr were accused of taking over four villages in the Lajat area and dispersing their inhabitants; an Ottoman force sent to punish them was thwarted by the local guards of the highway who sympathized with the tribesmen and facilitated their escape into Palestine.

The oral traditions of the Sakhr, as recorded in the early 20th century, date their entry into Transjordan to the 18th century. The Sakhr narrative claims they descended from the Harb tribe, which continues to live in the Hejaz in modern Saudi Arabia. According to these traditions, the Sakhr's entry into Transjordan was preceded by two successive migrations to the hill country of al-Ula in the northern Hejaz by its two constituent divisions, the Ka'abna and the Tuwaqa. The Ka'abna, who claimed descent from the Banu Muhammad branch of the Banu Salim section of the Harb, were first to break off from Harb territory for al-Ula, followed years later by the Tuwaqa, who claimed descent from the Ahamda branch of the Harb. After a period of eighty to one hundred years (according to the narrative), the tribe gradually migrated to the more fertile areas of Transjordan where they eventually entered into conflict with the main tribal power in this region, the Sardiyya. According to historian Nora Barakat, "It is difficult to discern" ties between the Sakhr who lived in Transjordan during the 14th–16th centuries with the Sakhr which emerges there in the 18th century. While the oral tradition does not mention them joining counterparts already established in Transjordan, Barakat raises the possibility that the Sakhr migrants maintained contact with descendants of the Sakhr recorded in the region in earlier centuries.

=== Role in the Hajj caravan (late 17th–early 19th centuries) ===
The tribe may have vied with the Sardiyya over the lucrative rights to protect the annual Hajj pilgrim caravan to Mecca as early as the late 17th century. The tribe was first listed in a register detailing allocations to the Bedouins by the provincial government in Damascus for this purpose in 1672, when their share was eclipsed by that of the Sardiyya emirs. The leaders of the Sakhr, chiefly Dabis al-Fayiz of the Tuwaqa and Sulayman al-Khuraysha of the Ka'abna, forged an agreement with the Sharif of Mecca, Sa'd ibn Zayd, in 1703, which augmented their security responsbilities and pay. This was reflected in the register of 1703, showing a substantial increase (roughly 2,300%) in their pay from 1674. Also gaining in Hajj responsibilities and payments at that time were the Anaza Bedouins, who had begun to migrate in great numbers to the Syrian Desert and steppe in the late 17th century and who were known to frequently threaten the Hajj caravan as it passed through the Hejaz.

The Sardiyya leaders still often held the formal offices of amir al-hajj (commander of the Hajj) and shaykh al-Sham (chief of the [southern] Syrian Bedouin) until at least 1718, but by the mid-18th century no longer appear in the Hajj allocations. Thus, by the early 18th century, the Sakhr and Anaza decisively overtook the Sardiyya as the main Bedouin beneficiaries of the Hajj economy. This period saw reforms consolidating command of the Hajj to the governor of Damascus rather than local powerbrokers like the Sardiyya emirs and increasing security on the caravan route by building and repairing fortified way stations. Amid the reforms, the Sakhr leadership secured large and stable government subsidies to the tribe in relation to their protection of the Hajj caravans, which continued into the early 19th century. From 1703 to 1803, the registers listed between 39 and 41 extended households of the Sakhr, each headed by a sheikh, to whom the subsidies were paid. (Note: These registers outlining payments to the tribesmen of the Sakhr and Anaza for protection of the Hajj were dated to 1718 (which included a history of payments from 1703), 1772, 1779 and 1803.)

The Sakhr were recruited by Sulayman Pasha al-Azm, the governor of Damascus, to assist in his siege of Tiberias in 1742, along with the Banu Saqr of the Beisan Valley; both tribes had been opposed to the increasingly powerful multazim (tax farmer) of Tiberias, Daher al-Umar. In October 1748, the Sakhr again came to the assistance of the governor of Damascus, now Sulayman's nephew As'ad Pasha al-Azm, by helping repulse a raid against the Midan suburb of Damascus by disgruntled janissaries and their Druze allies from the Talhuq clan. Relations between As'ad Pasha and the Sakhr became tense in the later years of his governorship (r. 1743–1756). While As'ad Pasha compromised with the more powerful Bedouin confederations, like the Anaza and the Harb, he frequently subdued the smaller tribes and withheld the customary Hajj protection subsidies from the Sakhr.

As'ad Pasha's successor, Husayn Pasha ibn Makki, similarly withheld the customary subsidies from the Sakhr and the smaller tribes in their orbit, including the Sardiyya, who were determined to regain their privileged place as guardians of the Hajj caravan from the more powerful and numerous Anaza. In September 1757, the Sakhr and their allies led by Qa'dan al-Fa'iz, the son and successor of Dabis al-Fa'iz, staged a wide-scale assault against the Hajj caravan between Tabuk and Dhat Hajj, after having annihilated the relief force sent to escort it between Ma'an and Qatrana. The attack and its aftermath ended with the deaths of thousands of pilgrims, including the sister of the Ottoman sultan, and the plunder of all its goods. The scale of the assault shocked the Ottoman world and led to severe repercussions against the governor and leading imperial officials for their complicity or incompetence. In addition to economic factors and the suspected encouragement of Daher al-Umar, the Sakhr's attack was largely cast as revenge for the Damascus government's withholding of the tribe's customary subsidies. At the time that it occurred, the Anaza, the Sakhr's chief rival over these dues, were seasonally withdrawn deep into the Najd desert, afforing the Sakhr unhindered ability to launch the assault.

The following year, in June 1758, the Sakhr were attacked and defeated in advance of the Hajj by the new governor Çeteci Abdullah Pasha. Suppressed, they did not attempt a second assault against the caravan, sending a petition instead seeking reinstatement of their subsidies, which Abdullah Pasha ignored. In response, the Sakhr staged an assault against the relief force sent to escort the caravan on its return to Damascus, but were again defeated by government forces and their leader may have been captured and executed. In the 1760s, the Sakhr relocated to the Gaza–Ramla area of Palestine, where they soon displaced the older-established tribes and took over the duties of transporting grain to the chain of forts along the caravan routes to Mecca. They allied with the dominant tribe of this region, the Wuhaydat (or 'Wahidat'). Their growing strength led to conflict with the governor of Gaza, who they killed in battle in the mid-1760s. By the 1770s, (or the 1780s), the Sakhr were driven back east of the Jordan River, where they resumed their traditional Hajj guardian duties and their generous subsidies were restored by the government. The governor of Damascus, Muhammad Pasha al-Azm, ensured the safety of the Hajj caravan of 1772 from Bedouin attack by hiring transport animals from both the Sakhr and Anaza, thereby appeasing both tribes. Qa'dan was succeeded by his son Awad al-Fa'iz, who is recorded as the beneficiary of the 1803 Hajj allocations.

=== External challenges (late 18th–early 19th centuries) ===
In 1799, the Sakhr joined other tribes in the ranks of an Ottoman army at the Battle of Mount Tabor against a force from Napoleon's army under the command of General Kleber. The fighting occurred south of Nazareth, with the French having such an advantage in terms of guns and artillery that Amir Rabah, the leader of the Bani Sakher, commenting on the effectiveness of his spear, said that he "could not swim in hell with a stick."

In the late 18th century, the rapid expansion of the Saudi state and their Wahhabi backers represented the main challenge to Ottoman hegemony in the desert steppes of southern Syria, including Transjordan, the Hejaz and southern Iraq. Both the Sakhr and the Anaza balanced their ties with both the Ottoman and Saudi states during the following decades, nominally accepting the Saudi dynasty and Wahhabi version of Islam and paying taxes to the Saudis, while continuing their Hajj-related services for the Ottoman authorities. This balancing act began to unravel when the Saudis occupied Mecca in 1805, destabilizing the Hajj economy. In 1809, the Sakhr, under Qa'dan's son Sa'd al-Fa'iz, sided with the Ottomans, joining the army of Sulayman Pasha al-Adil, the Acre-based governor of Sidon and Damascus, to roll back the Wahhabis from Syria. This period also the strengthening of the Sakhr's presence in Transjordan, as Saudi pressures pushed Sakhr tribesmen who had remained in al-Ula in the northern Hejaz to emigrate toward Karak. Johann Ludwig Burckhardt noted in 1812 that the Sakhr dominated the desert east of Jordan, ousting rival tribes and trying to monopolize all the area's income.

The main domestic rivals of the Sakhr at this time was the Adwan tribe of the Balqa (central Transjordan), who the Sakhr had expelled to Jabal Ajlun by 1812. The two tribes had a decades-long rivalry but united ranks in the 1830s in the face of Syria's takeover by the Egyptian army of Ibrahim Pasha in 1832. At any given time, Egypt had 25,000 to 90,000 troops in Syria and was in constant need of transport animals, which Ibrahim Pasha attempted to levy from the Bedouin, particularly the Sakhr and Anaza, the region's chief camel-herding tribes. The Sakhr outright refused these requests to the frustration of Ibrahim Pasha, who launched multiple assaults to subdue the Sakhr. The Adwan and other local Bedouin supported the Sakhr in this struggle, though the constant attacks and heavy losses in animals led to the Adwan regaining advantage in the Balqa over the Sakhr in the following years, including after the end of Egyptian rule in 1840.

=== Late 19th century ===
In the mid-1850s and 1860s, amid global rise of demand for grain, mercantile families from Nablus, Jerusalem and Damascus began moving into the Balqa and opening wheat and barley plantations. Among them were the Abu Jabir family of Jerusalem, which partnered with the Rumayh al-Fa'iz of the Sakhr to start a plantation at the village of Yaduda. The agreement stipulated the Abu Jabir brothers' payment of all expenses in return for allotting half the harvest to the Sakhr and splitting ownership of the land, which was cultivated by peasants from Palestine and Egypt. The venture proved lucrative and more Sakhr sheikhs joined in the efforts into the 1870s, opening up plantations south of Yaduda, including more prominently at Umm al-Amad. In the words of historian Mustafa Hamarneh, the sheikhs became a "new landed aristocracy".

For fifty years up to 1920 the Bani Sakher were friends and allies of the Al Rashid dynasty. The relationship ended with Ibn Saud's conquest of the Nejd. It had its roots in the early nineteenth century when Abdullah Ibn Rashid was fleeing the Ibn Ali family after a conflict over leadership of the Shammar tribe. Ibn Rashid and his brother with a single camel arrived at the tents belonging to Ali Al-Khraisha, leader of the Bani Sakher and father of Haditha Al-Khraisha. Sheikh Ali Al-Khraisha was not there but all the same they were given hospitality. During the night the camel died and the next day they continued their flight on foot. Some distance from the camp they met Sheikh Ali Al-Khraisha returning home. On hearing their story he insisted on them taking the camel he was riding, claiming that no guest who came into his camp riding should leave on foot. When Ibn Rashid came to power in the Nejd this deed was remembered.

In 1875, a member of the Palestine Exploration Fund's survey team reported finding the Bani Sakhr of the Ghor, who claim descent from the Bani Sakhr of the Hauran, had several herds containing 100 to 300 head of cattle and many sheep and goats as well as camels and horses. He mentions that they had fewer camels than previously since their power had been broken 7 or 8 years earlier by Mohammed Said, Pasha of Nablus, but that the current government was impotent. He counted 150 tents and estimated the tribe strength as 400 men.

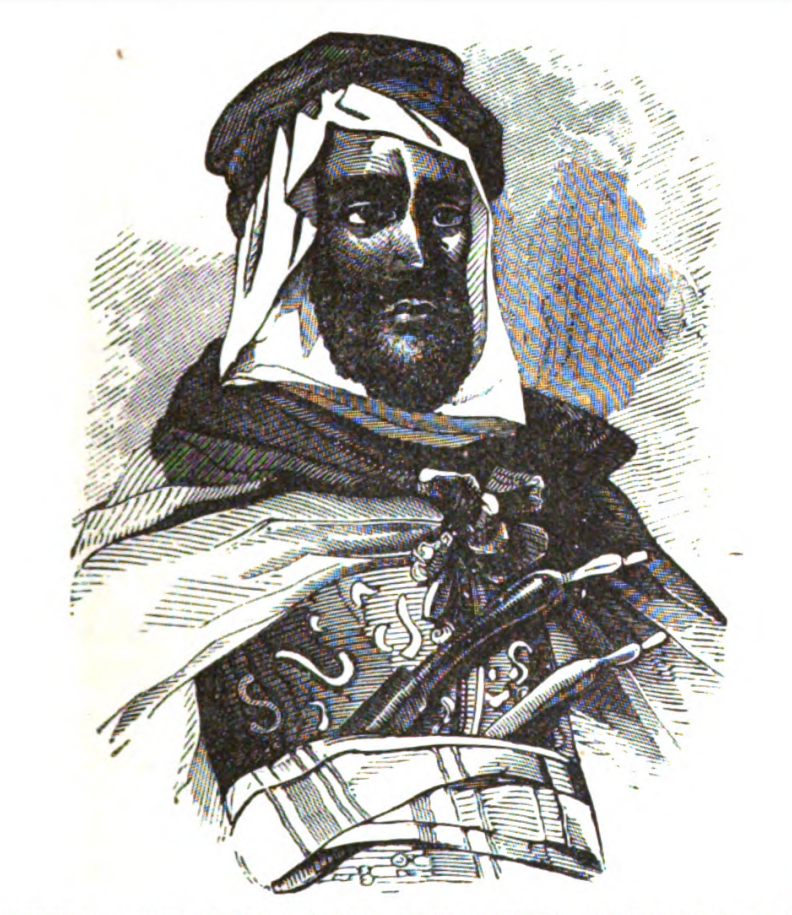
Sheikh of Bani Sakhr Fendi Al-Fayez "The Old King" circa 1860s

Two years later, 1877, the survey team led by Lieutenant Kitchener, found the Bani Sakhr camped on the road to Jenin, and later between Beisan and Tiberias. Kitchener reported that their Sheikh, Fendi Al-Fayez, was the most powerful local leader and could muster 4,500 fighting men. The sheikh showed Kitchener a coat of mail that probably dated to the early centuries of the Arab conquests and appeared to be on good terms with the government. The tribe showed no sign of lawlessness, though local farmers had to harvest their crops early to avoid them being eaten by the grazing camels. The Bani Sakhr showed no interest in the ongoing war in the Balkans and expressed a strong dislike of the Turks.

In November 1877 Kitchener visited the Bani Sakhr again. This time they were camped in Wadi Farrah having left the area around Zerin in the Jezreel Valley following the murder near Nazareth of a British man, Mr Gale, about which they had come under suspicion. Sheikh Fendy was absent at Bosra selling camel to pilgrims on the Haj. The Bani Sakhr were close to having a monopoly in this trade and could make £1,500 in a season. Whilst in Bosra the sheikh was arrested. His son was killed in a rescue attempt. The father was released and is reported as having said "My son and I were servants of the Sultan, now he has one less". This was taken to mean that the tribe would not engage in a blood feud.

In 1891 missionaries reported fighting north of Kerak between the Bani Sakhr and the Hameidah. And again in 1893 the route between Kerak and Madaba was closed due to fighting between the Bani Sakhr and the Anazi.

=== Emirate of Transjordan (early 20th century) ===
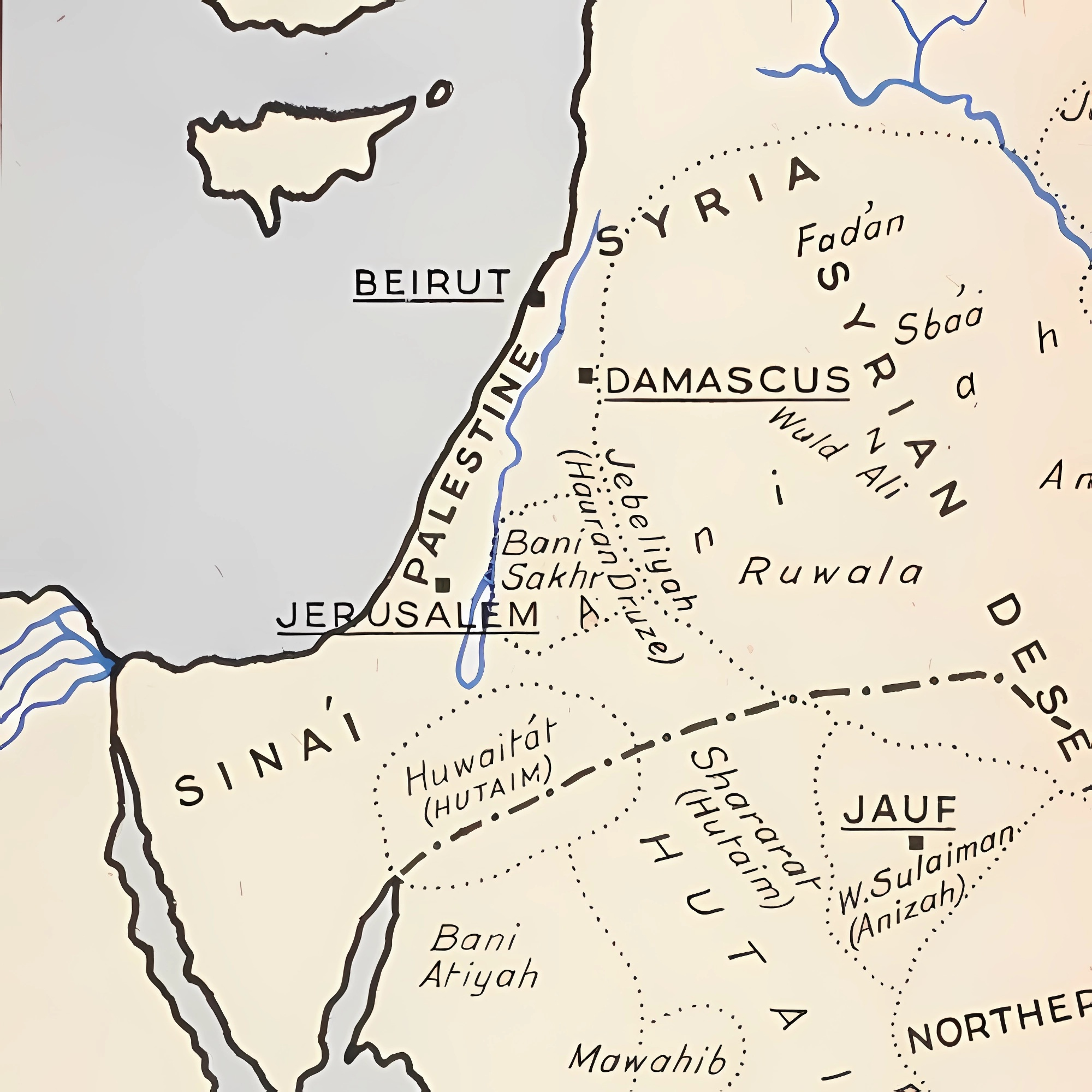
The borders of Bani Sakhr in the first half of the 20th century.

In June 1917 Fawaz el Fayez, one of the leaders of the Bani Sakhr, had a secret meeting with T. E. Lawrence. El Fayez was a member of an anti-Turkish committee in Damascus and Lawrence was seeking support for his military campaign. Immediately after the meeting, Lawrence fled fearing betrayal. El Fayez was killed shortly afterwards. By June 1918 the Bani Sakhr were united in their opposition to the Turks and were offering to provide the Husseini forces with at least eleven thousand men costing £30,000 (£1,715,944.76 adjusted to inflation as of April 2020) a month. In addition they would donate the harvest of Kerak and Madeba.

In 1923 Ibn Saud's Ikhwan initiated their first attack on the Emirate of Transjordan by massacring two villages 12 miles south of Amman belonging to the tribe of Bani Sakhr. In a two-day battle, the tribesmen of Bani Sakhr assisted by the Hadid tribe managed to defeat the raiders. The raiders were intercepted by British armored cars and planes only after they had begun to withdraw.

On 8 April 1933 Sheikh Mithqal Pasha al-Fayez, Chief of the Al-Fayez and the Bani Sakhr, was a member of a delegation which met the President of the World Zionist Organization, Chaim Weizmann, and the head of the Zionist political department in Palestine, Chaim Arlosoroff, at the King David Hotel in Jerusalem.

A series of events in the 1920s and 1930s put further pressure on their nomadic lifestyle, eventually leading to famine. The Bani Sakhr were saved from this by the British government ruling Jordan at the time. In exchange, the British required the Bani Sakhr to give up their nomadic lifestyle and turned more towards a semi-nomadic life. In the decades since then, pressures on the Bani Sakhr to give up part of their land have led to occasional tension between them and the Jordanian government. However, this tribe has always been counted as stalwart allies of the Hashemite ruling family since the days of King Abdullah I.

In 1938, the tribe was estimated to consist of 1,140 tents, dispersed across the region from Amman to Madaba and from the Balqa region to Wadi Sirhan.

== Bibliography ==
- Allinson, Jamie (2016). The Struggle for the State in Jordan: The Social Origins of Alliances in the Middle East. London: I. B. Tauris. ISBN 978-1-78453-230-7.
- Bakhit, Muhammad Adnan Salamah (1972). The Ottoman Province of Damascus in the Sixteenth Century (PhD).
- Bakhit, M. A. (1995). "Sakhr". In Bosworth, C. E.; van Donzel, E.; Heinrichs, W. P. & Lecomte, G. (eds.). The Encyclopaedia of Islam, Second Edition. Volume VIII: Ned–Sam. Leiden: E. J. Brill. pp. 882–883. ISBN 978-90-04-09834-3.
- Barakat, Nora Elizabeth (2023). Bedouin Bureaucrats: Mobility and Property in the Ottoman Empire (paperback ed.). Stanford: Stanford University Press. ISBN 9781503635623.
- Cohen, Amnon (1973). Palestine in the 18th Century: Patterns of Government and Administration. Jerusalem: The Magnes Press. ISBN 978-0-19-647903-3.
- Drake, C.F. Tyrwhitt (1875). "Mr Tyrwhitt Drake´s report". Quarterly Statement - Palestine Exploration Fund. 7: 27–34.
- Forder, Archibald (1902). "With the Arabs in tent and town; an account of missionary work, life, and experiences in Moab and Edom, and the first missionary journey into Arabia from the north" (3 ed.). London: Marshall Brothers.
- Glubb, John (1978). Arabian Adventures. Ten years of joyful service. Cassel. ISBN 0-304-30171-X.
- Kitchener, H. H. (1877). "Journal of the Survey". Quarterly Statement - Palestine Exploration Fund. 9: 162–164.
- Kitchener, H. H. (1878). "Lieut. Kitchener´s report". Quarterly Statement - Palestine Exploration Fund. 10: 11–14.
- Kitchener, H. H. (1878). "Journal of the Survey". Quarterly Statement - Palestine Exploration Fund. 10 (2): 62–67. doi:10.1179/peq.1878.10.2.62.
- Macalister, R. A. Stewart; Masterman, E. W. G. (1906). "Occasional Papers on the Modern inhabitants of Palestine, part VI". Quarterly Statement - Palestine Exploration Fund. 38: 110–114. doi:10.1179/peq.1906.38.2.110.
- Peake, Frederick Gerard (1934). A History of Trans-Jordan and its Tribes, Vol. 2. Amman.
- Rafeq, Abdul Karim (1966). The Province of Damascus, 1723–1783. Beirut: Khayats.
