= Gözerek =

Gözerek can refer to:

- Gözerek, Çermik
- Gözerek, Karakoçan
