= Saltepe =

Saltepe can refer to:

- Saltepe, Çermik
- Saltepe, Hınıs
