= Akkoyunlu =

Akkoyunlu can refer to:

- Akkoyunlu, Başmakçı
- Akkoyunlu, Çermik
- Akkoyunlu, Çobanlar
- the Turkish name for Aq Qoyunlu
