= Keklikköy =

Keklikköy can refer to:

- Keklikköy, Çermik
- Keklikköy, Karakoçan
