= Konuksever =

Konuksever can refer to:

- Konuksever, Çermik
- Konuksever, Kemah
