= Kalac =

Kalac may refer to:

- Antun Kalac (1849–1919), Croatian writer, nationalist and priest
- Željko Kalac (born 1972), Australian association football player of Croatian descent
- Kalac, Bileća, a village in the Bileća municipality, Bosnia and Herzegovina
- Kalac, Goražde, a village in the Goražde municipality, Bosnia and Herzegovina
- Kalac, Croatia, a village in the Mošćenička Draga municipality, Primorje-Gorski Kotar County
- Kalaç (disambiguation), a Turkish toponym and surname
- Sejo Kalač (born 1964), pop-folk singer from Montenegro
