= Çeteci Abdullah Pasha =

Kurdish statesman in the Ottoman Empire

- Monarch: Mustafa III (1757-1774)

Wali of Damascus
- In office January 1758 – January 1760
- Preceded by: Husayn Pasha ibn Makki
- Succeeded by: Muhammad Pasha al-Shalik

Beylerbey of Diyarbekir
- In office 1760–1760
- In office 1752–1752
- In office 1750–1750
- In office 1740–1740

Wali of Erzurum
- In office 1754–1756
- Preceded by: Agha Mustafa Pasha
- Succeeded by: Mustafa Pasha
- In office 1751–1752
- Preceded by: Yazicizâde Ibrahim Pasha
- Succeeded by: Agha Mustafa Pasha

Wali of Aleppo
- In office 1757–1757

Wali of Kütahya
- In office 1753–1753

Wali of Van
- In office 1747–1747

Beylerbey of Adana
- In office 1746–1746

Beylerbey of Rakka
- In office 1741–1745

Wali of Sivas
- In office 1730–1739

Personal details
- Born: 1703 Çermik (Jarmak), Diyarbekir Eyalet
- Died: 1760 (aged 56–57) Damascus, Damascus Eyalet

Çeteci Abdullah Pasha ibn Ibrahim al-Husayni al-Jarmaki (also known as Abdullah Pasha al-Jatahji) was an Ottoman statesman of Kurdish origin. He served terms as the governor of Sivas, Diyarbekir, Rakka, Adana, Van, Erzurum, Kütahya, Aleppo and Damascus. Çeteci was born in 1703 in the village of Çermik (also spelled Jarmak), hence his surname "al-Jarmaki".

Prior to his political career, Çeteci was a "distinguished field commander" according to Alexis de Tocqueville. He fought in the Ottoman campaigns in the Caucasus in the 1720s and in the war against the Safavid Empire. During those campaigns he served as a levend başağasi (commander of a mercenary battalion). He was promoted to beylerbey of Sivas in 1739. He founded the Çeteci Abdullah Pasha Medresesi, an Islamic school in his hometown of Çermik in 1756–57.

== Governor of Damascus ==
Çeteci entered office in January 1758 after his predecessor Husayn Pasha ibn Makki failed to protect the Hajj caravan from a massive Bedouin raid. His first major action was suppressing a revolt by the Janissaries who had staged a revolt during Husayn Pasha's tenure. The revolt in the Midan district was put down, but Çeteci's troops engaged in mass killings and looting against rebellious neighborhoods. Several men, women and children were killed.

The economy in Damascus, already flailing, was severely damaged during the revolt's suppression since Midan was a major bread market for the city. Its bakeries closed as a result of the violence. The events in Midan coincided with bad grain harvest elsewhere in the province, resulting in the depletion of bread in bakeries throughout the city. According to a Damascene chronicler at the time, the empty bakeries were surrounded by "great crowds of men, women and children, from whom heart-breaking cries and wails were heard". Çeteci, wary of a repeat of the bread riots of 1757, dispatched troops to guard the bakeries.

Çeteci replaced the naqib al-ashraf (politically privileged descendant of Muhammad) Sayyid Hamza with his rival Ali al-Ajlani. Hamza was exiled to Cyprus on Çeteci's orders and Ajlani remained in the post until his death in 1778. Çeteci was reappointed as governor of Diyarbaker in January 1760. He was succeeded as governor of Damascus by Muhammad Pasha al-Shalik, who served for a few months before being replaced by Uthman Pasha al-Kurji. Çeteci died later in 1760.

== Bibliography ==
- Barbir, Karl K. (2014). Ottoman Rule in Damascus, 1708-1758. Princeton University Press. ISBN 9781400853205.
- Grehan, James (2007). Everyday Life and Consumer Culture in Eighteenth-Century Damascus. University of Washington Press. ISBN 9780295801636.
- Joudah, Ahmad Hasan (1986). Revolt in Palestine in the Eighteenth Century: The Era of Shaykh Zahir Al-ʻUmar. Kingston Press. ISBN 9780940670112.
- Konukçu, Enver (1992). Erzurum (in Turkish). Erzurum Ticaret ve Sanayi Odası.
- Melek, Ali (2009). Dini değerleri ile Diyarbakır: peygamber makan ve kabirleri, sahabe türbe ve kabirleri, tarihi cami ve mescitler, medreseler, türbeler, havralar, kiliseler (in Turkish). Diyarbakır İl Müftülüğü. ISBN 9786053781028.
- Salzmann, Ariel (2004). Tocqueville in the Ottoman Empire: rival paths to the modern state. BRILL. ISBN 978-90-04-10887-5.
- Sharon, Moshe (2013). Corpus Inscriptionum Arabicarum Palaestinae, H-I. Vol. 5. BRILL. ISBN 978-90-04-25097-0.
- Sinclair, T.A. (1989). Eastern Turkey: An Architectural & Archaeological Survey: Volume III. Pindar Press. ISBN 9781904597780.

Regnal titles
Preceded by Husayn Pasha ibn Makki	Wali of Damascus; 1758-1760	Succeeded by Muhammad Pasha al-Shalik
