= Bairak =

Bairak may refer to:

- Bairak, Romny Raion, Sumy Oblast, a village in Ukraine
- Bairak, Izium Raion, Kharkiv Oblast, a village in Ukraine
- Velykyi Bairak, a village in Myrhorod Raion, Poltava Oblast, Ukraine

== See also ==
- Bayrak (disambiguation)
- Bayrak (surname) or Bairak
