= Artuk =

Artuk can refer to:

- Artuk Bey
  - Artuk Bey (fictional character)
- Artuk, Çermik
- Art UK
