= Konaklı =

Konaklı (Turkish: Konaklı) may refer to:

- Konaklı, Alucra
- Konaklı, Antalya
- Konaklı, Arhavi
- Konaklı, Ardanuç
- Konaklı, Bozdoğan
- Konaklı, Çatalzeytin
- Konaklı, Çermik
- Konaklı, Çorum
- Konaklı, Dörtyol
- Konaklı, Düzce
- Konaklı, Erzurum
- Konaklı, İzmir
- Konaklı, Kozluk
- Konaklı, Kumru
- Konaklı, Mardin
- Konaklı, Niğde, the Turkish name for Misthi, Cappadocia
- Konaklı, Nilüfer
- Konaklı, Şefaatli
- Konaklı, Şiran
