= Eskibağ =

Eskibağ can refer to:

- Eskibağ, Çermik
- Eskibağ, Gündoğmuş
