= Aynali =

Aynalı can refer to:

- Aynalı, Çermik
- Aynalı, Düzce
