= Bahçeköy =

Bahçeköy (literally "garden village") is a Turkish place name that may refer to the following places in Turkey:

- Bahçeköy, Bolu, a village in the district of Bolu, Bolu Province
- Bahçeköy, Çermik
- Bahçeköy, Dicle
- Bahçeköy, Düzce
- Bahçeköy, Karacasu, a village in the district of Karacasu, Aydın Province
- Bahçeköy, Keşan
- Bahçeköy, Sarıyer, a neighborhood of Sarıyer district in Istanbul Province, Turkey
- Bahçeköy, Tavas
