= Yeşilova (disambiguation) =

Yeşilova is a town and district of Burdur Province, Turkey.

Yeşilova (literally "green plains" in Turkish) may also refer to:

== Places ==
- Yeşilova, Aksaray, a town in Aksaray Province, Turkey
- Yeşilova, Aziziye
- Yeşilova, Çermik
- Yeşilova, Gölyaka
- Yeşilova, Karayazı
- Yeşilova, Maden
- Yeşilova, Tufanbeyli, a village in Tufanbeyli district of Adana Province, Turkey
- Yeşilova, Adıyaman, a village in the central district of Aksaray Province, Turkey
- Yeşilova, Mersin, a village in Akdeniz district of Mersin Province, Turkey
- Yeşilova Höyük, a höyük (mound) in Bornova, Turkey, and a prehistoric settlement
- Yeşilova, Mecitözü a village in the Mecitözü District of Çorum Province in Turkey
- Yeşilova, Mustafakemalpaşa a village in the Mustafakemalpaşa district of Bursa Province, Turkey
- Yeşilova, Sungurlu a village in the Sungurlu District of Çorum Province in Turkey

== People ==
- Yüksel Yesilova

== See also ==
- Yeşilova incident, an armed stand off that took place in April 1991 between British Royal Marines and the Turkish Armed Forces at a Kurdish refugee camp
- Yeşilova S.K. (football club)
- Yeşilovacık, a town in Mersin Province, Turkey
