= Azizli =

Azizli may refer to:

- Əzizli, Azerbaijan
- Azizli, Iran
