= Petekkaya =

Petekkaya can refer to:

- Petekkaya, Bayburt
- Petekkaya, Çermik
