= Kuyuköy =

Kuyuköy can refer to:

- Kuyuköy, Çermik
- Kuyuköy, Merzifon
