= Guzel =

Guzel or Güzel may refer to:

- Güzel, Çermik
- Güzel, Güdül, village in Ankara Province, Turkey
- Güzel İstanbul, a sculpture in Istanbul by Gürdal Duyar
- Güzel (album) by Turkish pop music singer Yıldız Tilbe

== Given name ==
- Guzel Maitdinova (born 1952), Eurasian geopolitician, ethnologist, historian and archeologist
- Guzel Khubbieva (born 1976), Uzbekistani sprinter
- Guzel Yakhina (born 1977), Russian author and screenwriter
- Guzel Manyurova (born 1978), Russian and Kazakhstani freestyle wrestler

== Surnames ==
- Ecem Güzel (born 1995), Turkish sport sailor
- Galip Güzel (born 1987), Turkish association football player
- Hasan Celal Güzel (1945–2018), Turkish journalist and politician
