= Asmalık, Çermik =

Village in Turkey

Asmalık
- Neighbourhood
- Location in Turkey
- Coordinates: 38°11′N 39°31′E
- Country: Turkey
- Province: Diyarbakır
- District: Çermik
- Population (2022): 153
- Time zone: UTC+3 (TRT)

Asmalık is a neighbourhood in the municipality and district of Çermik, Diyarbakır Province in Turkey. Its population is 153 (2022).
