= Çalıtepe, Çermik =

Village in Turkey

Çalıtepe
- Neighbourhood
- Location in Turkey
- Coordinates: 38°01′N 39°27′E
- Country: Turkey
- Province: Diyarbakır
- District: Çermik
- Population (2022): 254
- Time zone: UTC+3 (TRT)

Çalıtepe is a neighbourhood in the municipality and district of Çermik, Diyarbakır Province in Turkey. Its population is 254 (2022).
