= Ağaçhan, Çermik =

Village in Turkey

Ağaçhan
- Neighbourhood
- Location in Turkey
- Coordinates: 37°58′N 39°20′E
- Country: Turkey
- Province: Diyarbakır
- District: Çermik
- Population (2022): 77
- Time zone: UTC+3 (TRT)

Ağaçhan is a neighbourhood in the municipality and district of Çermik, Diyarbakır Province in Turkey. Its population is 77 (2022).
