= Ceylan, Çermik =

Village in Turkey

Ceylan
- Neighbourhood
- Location in Turkey
- Coordinates: 38.0526°N 39.2376°E
- Country: Turkey
- Province: Diyarbakır
- District: Çermik
- Population (2022): 103
- Time zone: UTC+3 (TRT)

Ceylan is a neighborhood in the municipality and district of Çermik, Diyarbakır Province in Turkey. Its population is 103 (2022).
