= Gürüz, Çermik =

Village in Turkey

Gürüz
- Neighbourhood
- Location in Turkey
- Coordinates: 37°59′38″N 39°22′16″E
- Country: Turkey
- Province: Diyarbakır
- District: Çermik
- Population (2022): 1,047
- Time zone: UTC+3 (TRT)

Gürüz is a neighbourhood in the municipality and district of Çermik, Diyarbakır Province in Turkey. Its population is 1,047 (2022).
