= Bulundu, Çermik =

Village in Turkey

Bulundu
- Neighbourhood
- Location in Turkey
- Coordinates: 38°02′N 39°23′E
- Country: Turkey
- Province: Diyarbakır
- District: Çermik
- Population (2022): 95
- Time zone: UTC+3 (TRT)

Bulundu is a neighbourhood in the municipality and district of Çermik, Diyarbakır Province in Turkey. Its population is 95 (2022).
