= Karataş, Çermik =

Village in Turkey

Karataş
- Neighbourhood
- Country: Turkey
- Province: Diyarbakır
- District: Çermik
- Population (2022): 298
- Time zone: UTC+3 (TRT)

Karataş is a neighbourhood in the municipality and district of Çermik, Diyarbakır Province in Turkey. Its population is 298 as of 2,022.
