= Kartaltaşı, Çermik =

Village in Turkey

Kartaltaşı
- Neighbourhood
- Location in Turkey
- Coordinates: 38°04′N 39°25′E
- Country: Turkey
- Province: Diyarbakır
- District: Çermik
- Population (2022): 175
- Time zone: UTC+3 (TRT)

Kartaltaşı is a neighbourhood in the municipality and district of Çermik, Diyarbakır Province in Turkey. Its population is 175 (2022).
