= Aşağıtaşmalı, Çermik =

Village in Turkey

Aşağıtaşmalı
- Neighbourhood
- Location in Turkey
- Coordinates: 38.0703°N 39.6459°E
- Country: Turkey
- Province: Diyarbakır
- District: Çermik
- Population (2022): 351
- Time zone: UTC+3 (TRT)

Aşağıtaşmalı is a neighbourhood in the municipality and district of Çermik, Diyarbakır Province in Turkey. Its population is 351 (2022).
