= Haburman Bridge =

Haburman Bridge Haburman Köprüsü (Çermik Köprüsü)
- Coordinates: 38.1312°N 39.4427°E
- Crosses: Sinek Creek
- Locale: Çermik, Diyarbakır Province
- Owner: General Directorate of Highways

Characteristics
- Total length: 107 m (351 ft) each
- Width: 5.60 m (18.4 ft) each

History
- Construction end: 1179; 846 years ago

Haburman Bridge, also known as Çermik Bridge, (Turkish: Haburman Köprüsü or Çermik Köprüsü) is a historic bridge in Diyarbakır Province, southeastern Turkey.

The bridge is in Çermik ilçe (district) of Diyarbakır Province. It is built over Sinek creek which is a tributary of Fırat River (Euphrates).

According to the inscription of the bridge it was commissioned by Zübeyde Hatun (princess) of Artuqids in 1179. She was the daughter of Necmettin Alpi of the Mardin branch. It was restored in 1927. In 2010, after the construction of a new bridge the bridge was closed to the vehicle traffic.

The total length of the bridge is 107 metres (351 ft) and the width of the road is 5.60 metres (18.4 ft). There is no parapet. The width of the main arch is 19.50 metres (64.0 ft). Its height is 12.50 metres (41.0 ft). There are two auxiliary arches (for discharging) on each side. They are 7.30 metres (24.0 ft) and 5.10 metres (16.7 ft) wide. Main construction material is limestone. In certain parts brick has also been used.
