= Armutlu, Çermik =

Village in Turkey

Armutlu
- Neighbourhood
- Location in Turkey
- Coordinates: 38.0629°N 39.3252°E
- Country: Turkey
- Province: Diyarbakır
- District: Çermik
- Population (2022): 90
- Time zone: UTC+3 (TRT)

Armutlu is a neighbourhood in the municipality and district of Çermik, Diyarbakır Province in Turkey. Its population is 90 (2022).
