= Yaylacık, Çermik =

Village in Turkey

Yaylacık
- Neighbourhood
- Location in Turkey
- Coordinates: 37°58′41″N 39°16′48″E
- Country: Turkey
- Province: Diyarbakır
- District: Çermik
- Population (2022): 543
- Time zone: UTC+3 (TRT)

Yaylacık is a neighbourhood in the municipality and district of Çermik, Diyarbakır Province in Turkey. Its population is 543 (2022).
