= Bademlik, Çermik =

Village in Turkey

Bademlik
- Neighbourhood
- Location in Turkey
- Coordinates: 38.0911°N 39.3915°E
- Country: Turkey
- Province: Diyarbakır
- District: Çermik
- Population (2022): 361
- Time zone: UTC+3 (TRT)

Bademlik is a neighbourhood in the municipality and district of Çermik, Diyarbakır Province in Turkey. Its population is 361 (2022).
