= Besri =

Besri or Basri or Basari (Persian: بصري) may refer to:

- Basri, Bushehr
- Besri, Lorestan
- Besri, Markazi
- Basri, West Azerbaijan
