= Göktepe, Çermik =

Village in Turkey

Göktepe
- Neighbourhood
- Location in Turkey
- Coordinates: 38.0937°N 39.3496°E
- Country: Turkey
- Province: Diyarbakır
- District: Çermik
- Population (2022): 272
- Time zone: UTC+3 (TRT)

Göktepe is a neighborhood in the municipality and district of Çermik, Diyarbakır Province in Turkey. Its population is 272 (2022).
