= Bayat, Çermik =

Village in Turkey

Bayat
- Neighbourhood
- Location in Turkey
- Coordinates: 38.0400°N 39.2572°E
- Country: Turkey
- Province: Diyarbakır
- District: Çermik
- Population (2022): 261
- Time zone: UTC+3 (TRT)

Bayat is a neighbourhood in the municipality and district of Çermik, Diyarbakır Province in Turkey. Its population is 261 (2022).
