= Xaspoladoba =

Khaspoladoba
- Municipality
- Azerbaijani: Xaspoladoba
- Location within Azerbaijan
- Coordinates: 41°29′38″N 48°49′36″E
- Country: Azerbaijan
- Rayon: Khachmaz

Population
  - Total: 1,837
- Time zone: UTC+4 (AZT)
  - Summer (DST): UTC+5 (AZT)

Xaspoladoba (also, Khaspoladoba and Khaspolatoba) is a village and municipality in the Khachmaz District of Azerbaijan. It has a population of 1,837. The municipality consists of the villages of Khaspoladoba, Babali, Azizli, and Ganjali.
