= Çermik =

- District and municipality
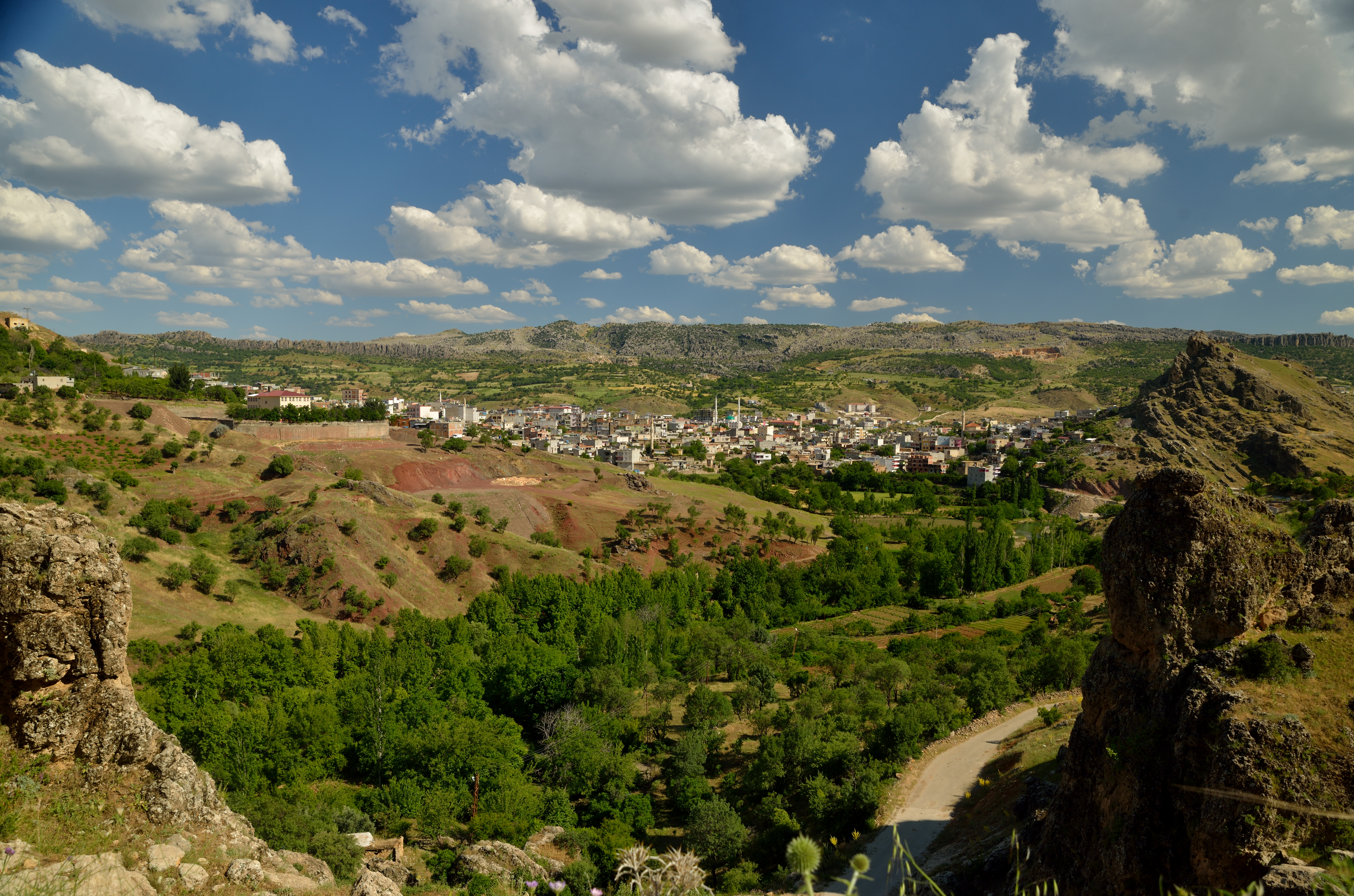

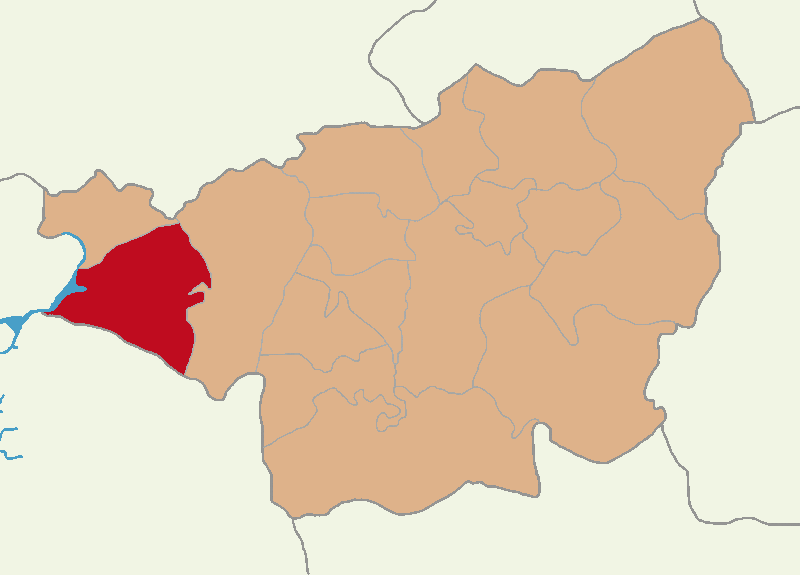
- Map showing Çermik District in Diyarbakır Province

- Location within Turkey
- Coordinates: 38°08′14″N 39°27′04″E
- Country: Turkey
- Province: Diyarbakır

Government
  - Mayor: Şehmus Karamehmetoğlu (AKP)
- Area: 948 km^{2} (366 sq mi)
- Population (2022): 49,644
  - Density: 52.4/km^{2} (136/sq mi)
- Time zone: UTC+3 (TRT)
- Postal code: 21600
- Area code: 0412
- Website: www.cermik.bel.tr

Çermik (Armenian: Ջերմուկ, romanized: Jermuk, lit. 'hot springs'; Kurdish: Çermûk) is a municipality and district of Diyarbakır Province, Turkey. Its area is 948 km^{2}, and its population is 49,644 (2022). The mayor is Şehmus Karamehmetoğlu from the Justice and Development Party (AKP), and the current kaymakam is Vahit Yılmaz.

Çermik got its name from its natural spa. It was declared the Diyarbakir Thermal Tourism Center in October 1993.

== History ==
Within the Ottoman Empire, Çermik was within the Kurdish sanjaks of the Diyarbekir Eyelet. In 1925 the town came shortly under control of the rebels loyal to Sheikh Said.

== Demographics ==
On the eve of the First World War, 12,418 Armenians lived in the kaza of Çermik: 2,000 in the center of Çermik and 10,000 in Çüngüş. They had five churches, one monastery and five schools. They were massacred during the Armenian genocide.

The Jewish population left the town in 1948 when Israel was founded.

== Composition ==
There are 81 neighbourhoods in Çermik District:

- Ağaçhan
- Akçörten
- Akkoyunlu
- Akpınar
- Alabuğday
- Alakoç
- Arabük
- Armağantaşı
- Armutlu
- Artuk
- Aşağışeyhler
- Aşağıtaşmalı
- Asmalık
- Aynalı
- Bademlik
- Bahçe
- Balıksırtı
- Başarı
- Bayat
- Bayırbağı
- Baykal
- Bayrak
- Bintaş
- Bircemal
- Bulundu
- Çalıtepe
- Ceylan
- Çukur
- Çukurelma
- Değirmenli
- Dikyol
- Dilekpınar
- Elifuşağı
- Eskibağ
- Genceli
- Göktepe
- Gözerek
- Güçlütaş
- Günaşan
- Gürüz
- Güzel
- Haburman
- İkiçeltik
- İncili
- Kalaç
- Kale
- Kalecik
- Karacaviran
- Karakaya
- Karamusa
- Karataş
- Kartaltaşı
- Kayagediği
- Keklik
- Kırmatepe
- Köksal
- Kömürcüler
- Konaklı
- Konuksever
- Korudağ
- Kuşlukçayırı
- Kuyuköy
- Örenkuyu
- Pamuklu
- Petekkaya
- Pınarlı
- Recep
- Saltepe
- Saray
- Sarıbalta
- Sarıca
- Şeyhandede
- Sinek
- Tepe
- Toplu
- Yabanardı
- Yayıklı
- Yaylacık
- Yeşilova
- Yiğitler
- Yoğun

== Climate ==
Çermik has a Mediterranean climate (Köppen: Csa) with very hot, dry summers and cool, wet, occasionally snowy winters.

Climate data for Çermik (1991–2020)
Month	Jan	Feb	Mar	Apr	May	Jun	Jul	Aug	Sep	Oct	Nov	Dec	Year
Mean daily maximum °C (°F)	8.3 (46.9)	9.9 (49.8)	15.2 (59.4)	21.0 (69.8)	27.0 (80.6)	33.8 (92.8)	38.6 (101.5)	38.7 (101.7)	33.7 (92.7)	26.2 (79.2)	17.0 (62.6)	10.4 (50.7)	23.4 (74.1)
Daily mean °C (°F)	3.4 (38.1)	4.7 (40.5)	9.6 (49.3)	14.5 (58.1)	19.9 (67.8)	26.6 (79.9)	31.2 (88.2)	30.8 (87.4)	25.3 (77.5)	18.3 (64.9)	10.1 (50.2)	5.2 (41.4)	16.7 (62.1)
Mean daily minimum °C (°F)	−0.4 (31.3)	0.4 (32.7)	4.4 (39.9)	8.4 (47.1)	12.8 (55.0)	18.6 (65.5)	23.2 (73.8)	22.5 (72.5)	17.0 (62.6)	11.5 (52.7)	4.8 (40.6)	1.2 (34.2)	10.4 (50.7)
Average precipitation mm (inches)	124.92 (4.92)	102.08 (4.02)	95.63 (3.76)	77.8 (3.06)	49.11 (1.93)	11.66 (0.46)	1.56 (0.06)	1.69 (0.07)	7.1 (0.28)	47.57 (1.87)	75.27 (2.96)	129.12 (5.08)	723.51 (28.48)
Average precipitation days (≥ 1.0 mm)	9.1	9.5	9.1	8.3	6.4	2.2	1.4	1.1	1.8	4.5	6.4	9.8	69.6
Average relative humidity (%)	71.0	68.3	62.7	61.0	55.1	38.3	30.7	32.0	37.5	52.5	64.7	72.4	53.8
Source: NOAA

== Attractions ==
The baths in the area draw many visitors and tourists from Turkey, mostly of neighboring provinces.

Main attractions are the Haburman Bridge, Çeteci Abdullah Pasha Madrasa, Ulu Cami (the Grand Mosque) the Bandeler Fountain (Bandeler Çesmesi) and the Gelincik Dağı ( Mountain of Gelincik) The town also counts with a Synagogue which dates back to the 1416, but it is not in use.

== Notable people ==
- Çeteci Abdullah Pasha, Ottoman statesman.
- Ziya Gökalp, poer and sociologist
