= Bintaş, Çermik =

Village in Turkey

Bintaş
- Neighbourhood
- Location in Turkey
- Coordinates: 38.1520°N 39.5607°E
- Country: Turkey
- Province: Diyarbakır
- District: Çermik
- Population (2022): 498
- Time zone: UTC+3 (TRT)

Bintaş is a neighbourhood in the municipality and district of Çermik, Diyarbakır Province in Turkey. Its population is 498 (2022).
