= Yiğitler, Çermik =

Village in Turkey

Yiğitler
- Neighbourhood
- Country: Turkey
- Province: Diyarbakır
- District: Çermik
- Population (2022): 843
- Time zone: UTC+3 (TRT)

Yiğitler is a neighbourhood in the municipality and district of Çermik, Diyarbakır Province in Turkey. Its population is 843 (2022).
