= Şeyhandede, Çermik =

Village in Turkey

Şeyhandede
- Neighbourhood
- Location in Turkey
- Coordinates: 38°02′N 39°17′E
- Country: Turkey
- Province: Diyarbakır
- District: Çermik
- Population (2022): 435
- Time zone: UTC+3 (TRT)

Şeyhandede is a neighbourhood in the municipality and district of Çermik, Diyarbakır Province in Turkey. Its population is 435 (2022). The name Şeyhandede translates as “The Sheikhs of the Dede”, and in Zazaki, it is expressed as “Şêxanê Dedan.” The origin of this name dates back to the 12th century and is associated with a prominent spiritual figure known as Sheikh Ağbaş, referred to locally as “Babadede.” His full title was Taha wa Āl-i Yāsīn, Qutb al-ʿĀrifīn Sheikh Sayyid Ağbaş bin Sheikh Abu Saʿd al-Hasrani.

During the reign of Sultan Alaaddin, a significant amount of land was endowed in Sheikh Ağbaş’s name, forming a hereditary waqf (evladiyet vakfı) that continued to function into the Republican era. The descendants of this sheikhly lineage, known as the Sheikhs, not only administered the endowed lands but also served as the heads (postnişins) of the Ağbaş Dede Zawiya. Hence, the village became known as Şeyhandede, meaning “the village of the sheikhs.”

In Ottoman tax records from 1530, the village is listed as Şeyhler or Sekenak, while its highland pasture, known as “Dewa Diyarî,” is recorded as a mezra (subsidiary hamlet) of the Şeyhler (Sekenak) village.

Babadede’s father, Sheikh Abu Saʿd al-Hasrani, received his spiritual authority (khilafah) in the Qirklars tariqa from Tāj al-ʿĀrifīn Sheikh Muhammad Abu’l-Wafā in Baghdad and served as a sheikh in the vicinity of the Hasran region.

One of the most significant historical documents relating to the region is a 3.5-meter-long Arabic manuscript dated to 1473 (Hijri 878). This vakfiye (endowment deed) details the lineage of Sheikh Ahmad, a descendant of Sheikh Ağbaş and a member of the Ahl al-Bayt (the Prophet’s family). It also records the silsilah (spiritual genealogy), the boundaries of the Ağbaş Dede endowment lands—notably within the Hasran Castle area—and associated legal rights. These records were formally documented in Mecca by the Naqib al-Ashraf in the presence of witnesses.

Another Ottoman document from the year 1705 (Hijri 1117) outlines the hereditary custodianship of these lands and includes the following record:

“… From the Ağbaş area in Hisaran subdistrict, part of Çermik district of Diyarbekir… under hereditary ownership, custodians are Sayyid Dede Muhammad bin Hasan, his son Imam Sayyid Ahmad Efendi, Sayyid Abbas Efendi, Sayyid Muhammad Efendi, and from Debekir, Sayyid Muhammad Efendi, Abbas Efendi, Muhammad Amin Efendi; and from the subdistrict of Ferbun: Halil, Hasan, Sayyid Omar, Murad Khan, Allahverdi, Muhammad, and Osman. With their testimonies, it was established that the said son, Sayyid al-Sheikh Hasan, was the acting khalīfah… Upon request and declaration. Decree issued on the 9th of Sha‘bān, year 117 (1705 CE).”

Several Ottoman-era documents from the late period still remain untranslated.

Today, the majority of the village’s population consists of descendants of Babadede. In Zazaki, this lineage is referred to as “Dedan,” “the Dedes,” or “sons of the Dede” (Dedeoğulları). Over time, many adopted the surname Koca, the Turkish equivalent of “Sheikh” found in old dictionaries.

In addition to these descendants, other families have settled in the village due to various circumstances. Some of these families migrated in 1979 to the highland pasture of the village—Dewa Diyarî—and established what is now considered the winter satellite village of Şeyhandede.

Today, especially members of the Koca family have migrated for economic reasons to central Diyarbakır, Germany, Antalya, and Torbalı (İzmir).
