= Kuşlukçayırı, Çermik =

Village in Turkey

Kuşlukçayırı
- Neighbourhood
- Location in Turkey
- Coordinates: 37°54′N 39°34′E
- Country: Turkey
- Province: Diyarbakır
- District: Çermik
- Population (2022): 1,034
- Time zone: UTC+3 (TRT)

Kuşlukçayırı is a neighbourhood in the municipality and district of Çermik, Diyarbakır Province in Turkey. Its population is 1,034 (2022).
