= Korudağ, Çermik =

Village in Turkey

Korudağ
- Neighbourhood
- Location in Turkey
- Coordinates: 38°05′N 39°17′E
- Country: Turkey
- Province: Diyarbakır
- District: Çermik
- Population (2022): 444
- Time zone: UTC+3 (TRT)

Korudağ is a neighbourhood in the municipality and district of Çermik, Diyarbakır Province in Turkey. Its population is 444 (2022).
