= Dikyol, Çermik =

Village in Turkey

Dikyol
- Neighbourhood
- Location in Turkey
- Coordinates: 38°01′N 39°19′E
- Country: Turkey
- Province: Diyarbakır
- District: Çermik
- Population (2022): 183
- Time zone: UTC+3 (TRT)

Dikyol is a neighbourhood in the municipality and district of Çermik, Diyarbakır Province in Turkey. Its population is 183 (2022).
