= Bayrock =

Bayrock may refer to:

- Bayrock (radio station), a radio station in New Zealand
- Bayrock Group, an international real estate development and investment company based in New York
- Bay Rock Light, an inactive lighthouse relocated from an island off Townsville, Australia

== See also ==
- Bayrak (disambiguation)
