= Alakoç, Çermik =

Village in Turkey

Alakoç
- Neighbourhood
- Location in Turkey
- Coordinates: 38.1376°N 39.5560°E
- Country: Turkey
- Province: Diyarbakır
- District: Çermik
- Population (2022): 951
- Time zone: UTC+3 (TRT)

Alakoç is a neighbourhood in the municipality and district of Çermik, Diyarbakır Province in Turkey. Its population is 951 (2022).
