= Arabük, Çermik =

Village in Turkey

Arabük
- Neighbourhood
- Location in Turkey
- Coordinates: 37°57′N 39°31′E
- Country: Turkey
- Province: Diyarbakır
- District: Çermik
- Population (2022): 114
- Time zone: UTC+3 (TRT)

Arabük is a neighbourhood in the municipality and district of Çermik, Diyarbakır Province in Turkey. Its population is 114 (2022).
