= Bayırbağı, Çermik =

Village in Turkey

Bayırbağı
- Neighbourhood
- Location in Turkey
- Coordinates: 38.0998°N 39.5328°E
- Country: Turkey
- Province: Diyarbakır
- District: Çermik
- Population (2022): 81
- Time zone: UTC+3 (TRT)

Bayırbağı is a neighbourhood in the municipality and district of Çermik, Diyarbakır Province in Turkey. Its population is 81 (2022).
