= Köksal, Çermik =

Village in Turkey

Köksal
- Neighbourhood
- Location in Turkey
- Coordinates: 38°07′N 39°22′E
- Country: Turkey
- Province: Diyarbakır
- District: Çermik
- Population (2022): 422
- Time zone: UTC+3 (TRT)

Köksal is a neighbourhood in the municipality and district of Çermik, Diyarbakır Province in Turkey. Its population is 422 (2022).
