= Yoğun, Çermik =

Village in Turkey

Yoğun
- Neighbourhood
- Country: Turkey
- Province: Diyarbakır
- District: Çermik
- Population (2022): 229
- Time zone: UTC+3 (TRT)

Yoğun is a neighbourhood in the municipality and district of Çermik, Diyarbakır Province in Turkey. Its population is 229 (2022).
