= Aşağışeyhler, Çermik =

Village in Turkey

Aşağışeyhler
- Neighbourhood
- Location in Turkey
- Coordinates: 38°11′23″N 39°29′31″E
- Country: Turkey
- Province: Diyarbakır
- District: Çermik
- Population (2022): 255
- Time zone: UTC+3 (TRT)

Aşağışeyhler is a neighbourhood in the municipality and district of Çermik, Diyarbakır Province in Turkey. Its population is 255 (2022).
