= Günaşan, Çermik =

Village in Turkey

Günaşan
- Neighbourhood
- Location in Turkey
- Coordinates: 38°02′N 39°22′E
- Country: Turkey
- Province: Diyarbakır
- District: Çermik
- Population (2022): 267
- Time zone: UTC+3 (TRT)

Günaşan is a neighbourhood in the municipality and district of Çermik, Diyarbakır Province in Turkey. Its population is 267 (2022).
