= Haditha Al-Khraisha =

Jordanian Bedouin tribal sheikh (1882–1952)

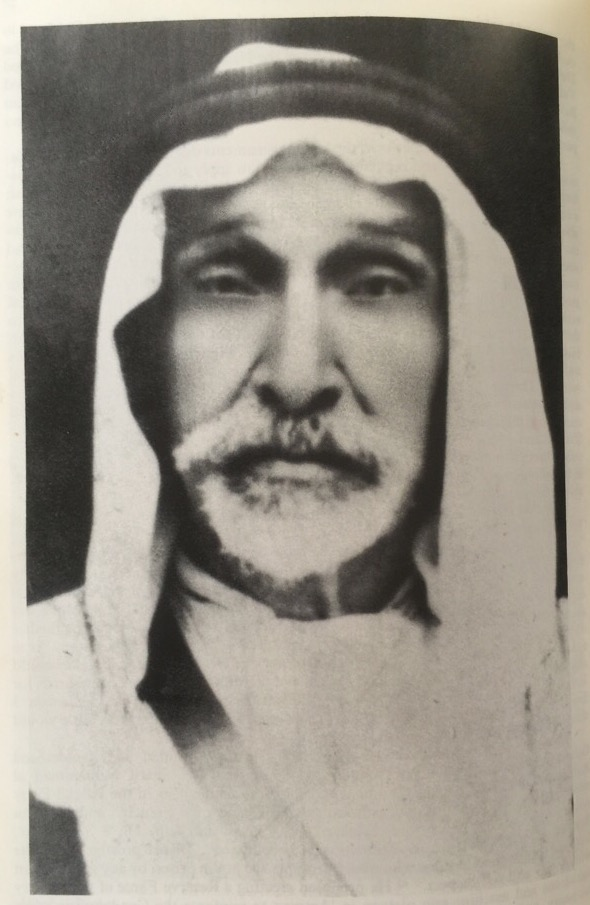
- Photo of Sheikh Haditha Al-Khraisha c. 1951
- Born: 1882
- Died: 1952 (age 69-70)
- Occupation: Bedouin tribal sheikh
- Known for: One of the two paramount sheikhs of the Bani Sakhr Tribe
- Notable work: Fought the Wahhabi Ikhwan, a religious militia that helped establish Abdul Aziz Ibn Saud as the first King of Saudi Arabia; Played a significant role in building the nascent Jordanian state and shaping its development; Served several terms as Senator and Parliamentarian, including the first Jordanian Senate in 1947; Elected to the second Legislative Council in June 1931, and the Fourth Legislative Council in 1937; One of the founding members of the Jordanian Solidarity Party (Hizb al-Tadamun al-Urduni) in March 1933; Cultivated the oasis of Azraq, Jordan

Haditha Ali Abdullah Al-Khraisha (Arabic: حديثه علي عبد الله حميدي خلف سالم حنيف محمد (سليم العود) محمد سليمان حنيف الخريشه; 1882–1952) was a Jordanian Bedouin tribal leader. He was one of the two paramount sheikhs of the Bani Sakhr Tribe, arguably the most powerful tribe in Jordan. Haditha headed the northern clans of the Bani Sakher (al-Ka'abnah), while Mithgal Al-Fayez headed the other half, (al-Twaga). In the early twentieth century (1922 & 1924), Haditha and the Bani Sakhr, in addition to other Trans-Jordanian tribes such as the Huweitat and the Belqawiah, fought the Wahhabi Ikhwan, a religious militia who helped establish Abdul Aziz Ibn Saud as the first King of Saudi Arabia. The Wahhabi Ikhwan were Abdul Aziz Ibn Saud's tool for territorial expansion and lent religious legitimacy to Ibn Saud's territorial and political ambitions. According to King Faisal Al Saud the armed resistance that Bani Sakhr put up against Ibn Saud and the Wahhabi Ikhwan was "the reason that Saudi Arabia's borders do not extend all the way to Palestine and why the Al Sauds never became the rulers of the Levant". Haditha was known throughout Arabia for his wisdom and chivalry, He played a significant role in building the nascent Jordanian state and shaping its development. An ally and supporter of King Abdullah I, Haditha served several terms as Senator and Parliamentarian, including the first Jordanian Senate in 1947 which consisted of only ten members. Haditha was also elected to the second Legislative Council in June 1931, and the Fourth Legislative Council in 1937 while Jordan was still an Emirate. Haditha was also one of the founding members of the Jordanian Solidarity Party (Hizb al-Tadamun al-Urduni) in March 1933. Sheikh Haditha also cultivated the oasis of Azraq, Jordan.

== Relationships with Emir Abdullah, Arab nationals and tribal sheikhs ==
Sheikh Haditha and Emir Abdullah, later King Abdullah I of Jordan generally maintained close relations, but the two also "periodically fell out". Emir Abdullah and Bani Sakhr had a "strong bond" and indeed in August 1922 Emir Abdullah moved his camp to Al-Muwaqqar, near the desert castles, the Khraishas' stomping grounds. There, Emir Abdullah started to organise a force of Bedouin warriors to defend [against the Wahhabi Ikhwan]. Emir Abdullah expressed his devotion and gratitude to their loyalty and courage through land allocations, gifts and even tax benefits. As head of the northern Ka'abnah tribes of Bani Sakhr, Haditha had close ties with Syrian Arab nationalists who held him in great regard. Emir Abdullah relied on Sheikh Haditha's relationships with the nationalists and the Sheikh was the Emir's link to them. During the 1925-1927 Syrian Revolt against the French Mandate, Syrian nationalists such Abd al-Rahman Shahbandar, took refuge with Sheikh Haditha in Al-Muwaqqar where the Sheikh had settled his tribe. Sultan Al-Atrash, Abd al-Rahman Shahbandar, and Nasib Bakri, three of the main leaders of the Syrian Revolt, were close friends of Sheikh Haditha and stayed with him in his camp near Azraq and in Al-Muwaqqar on several occasions. Indeed, they came to Amman through Azraq protected by Sheikh Haditha and secretly called on Emir Abdullah I in 1926. When Frederick Gerard Peake, Alec Kirkbride, and E.R. Stafford arrived in Al-Muwaqqar, and demanded that Sheikh Haditha hand over Syrian nationals and refugees under his care, he "told them that his camp was open to visitors to stay for three days before they were asked to be identified; if however, they claimed to be dakhil (someone who asks for the protection of a tribe against a threat), he could not be expected to hand them over," as that would have violated Bedouin codes of honour and hospitality. Sheikh Haditha was also Emir Abdullah's link to Shukri Al-Quwatli, post-independence Syria's first president. In November 1936, Sheikh Haditha, along with Mithqal Al-Fayez, accompanied Fawzi Al-Qawuqji, Supreme Commander of the Arab Revolution in South-Syrian Palestine, through the desert to ensure his safe journey.

Following the 1941 coup in Iraq that ousted Abdul Illah, Regent of Iraq, Emir Abdullah I dispatched the Mechanised Brigade of the Arab Legion to guide British troops across the desert to Iraq. Haditha instructed his men from Bani Sakhr serving in the Arab Legion to abstain from suppressing the Rashid Ali Gaylani revolt in Baghdad and resign from the Arab Legion rather than to fight other Arabs. Haditha's defiance of Emir Abdullah I and the British forced him to go into self-imposed exile in Saudi Arabia. The Khraisha family had enjoyed strong relations with the tribes of the Arabian Peninsula for centuries, particularly the Shammar Tribe of Ibn Rashid, traditional rivals of the House of Saud. The Al-Khraisha family's ties with the House of Rashid went back to the time of Sheikh Haditha's father, Ali. The origin of Ali Al-Khraisha's relationship with Abdullah ibn Rashid, the founder of the Emirate of Jabal Shammar, is related in John Bagot Glubb 1978 book Arabian Adventures. Early in the nineteenth century, the formidable Shammar Tribe of Nejd underwent an internal struggle for dominance. The two rival sheikhs were Ibn Ali and Ibn Rashid and at the end of the affair Ibn Ali won the struggle for precedence and Ibn Rashid and his brother, Obeid, were driven out of the tribe they had hoped to lead. Eventually the brothers reached Jordan with only one camel between them and landed at the tent of Sheikh Ali Al-Khraisha, the Sheikh of Bani Sakhr. The Sheikh was away but the family and servants took care of the guests. During the night their camel died and so they were forced to continue their journey on foot. A short distance from the camp, they met a Bedouin on camelback. The man stopped them and asked them their news and what camp they had just come from. After hearing their story, the man asked them if their host had supplied them with a fresh mount. The brothers replied that their host was away. The rider then dismounted, obliged them to mount and his camel, revealed that he was Sheikh Ali Al-Khraisha and swore that no guest of his would reach his tent riding and leave on foot. Years later, Abdullah Ibn Rashid returned to Shammar, drove out his rival, and became Emir of Northern Nejd. Abdullah and his descendants ruled for fifty years until they were driven out by Ibn Saud in 1920. For as long as they ruled, the House of Rashid treated the Khraisha family as friends and allies in memory of the camel given by Ali Al-Khraisha to Abdullah ibn Rashid in his destitution generations before.

In addition to supporting the Syrian nationalists in the mid-1920s, Sheikh Haditha also contributed to the Palestinian struggle. He also had firm bonds with the Circassians and Chechens of Transjordan who fled persecution in their original lands for being Muslim and whose rights in Jordan Sheikh Haditha fought for and defended. Sheikh Haditha was also a much sought-after and highly respected tribal arbiter and mediator; in affairs ranging from blood feuds to land disputes. For example, in 1943, Sheikh Haditha spent twenty days in Sama with officers from the Arab Legion to determine the boundaries of disputed land in the area

== Legacy ==
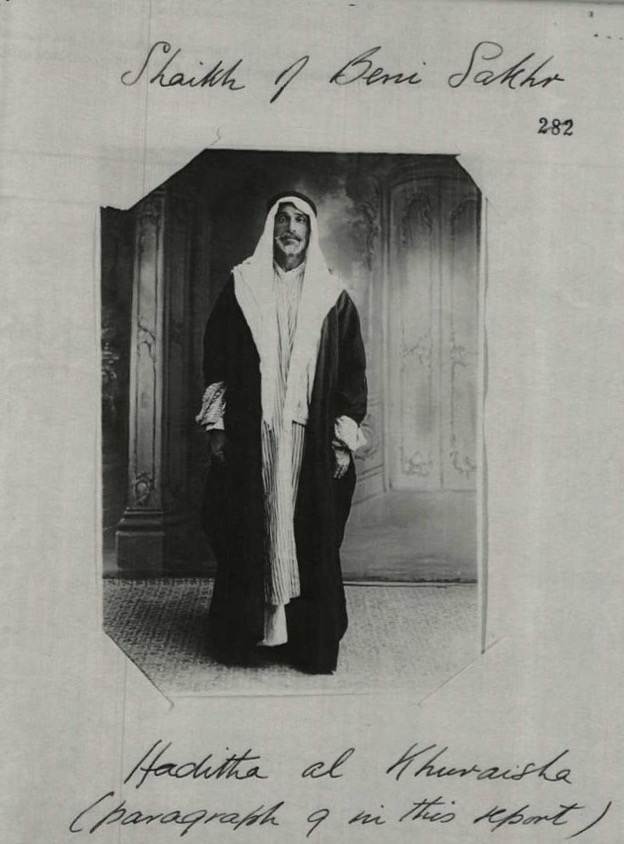
Sheikh Haditha Al-Khraisha of Beni Sakhr

Sheikh Haditha was respected both by his fellow Arabs, the orientalists who met him on their travels, and by the British Mandate officers with whom he came into contact, several of whom expressed their grudging admiration for the sheikh as in this report by Captain Dunbar Brunton in 1920: "Haditha, in particular, deserves the greatest credit for the way in which he acted as intermediary...sensible and reliable...is not wealthy but never begs like others and is generous...His manners are quiet and he has a great personal charm. One might term him the only real gentleman among the sheikhs of this region." Glubb described Sheikh Haditha as "a man of sincere religion and a high standard of honour." As Alon writes in The Making of Jordan: Tribes, Colonialism and the Modern State, "Haditha clearly embodied the stereotypical Bedouin gentleman so admired by the British. It is worth noting that Britons serving in Transjordan in later years often remarked on his virtues." In Adventures in Arabia, Seabrook describes Haditha as a man who possessed a "courtly dignity ... a tall, elderly man, of grave and noble countenance, seldom smiling, with whitening beard, and the far-away look of a dreamer in his eyes... [The Bedouin's] code of honor, in some respects, is as quixotic and fantastic as that of King Arthur's knights. Haditha embodied it, perhaps more than any other Bedouin I met. My friend Mithkal [Al-Fayez] was rich, prosperous, and worldly-wise, cynical, too, in an amiable way; yet he revered Haditha as a sort of saint. Haditha was "universally honored and beloved" and was "famous throughout the desert because of his extraordinary generosity".

== Anecdotes ==
Known throughout the Levant and the Arabian Peninsula for his chivalry and wisdom, many anecdotes about Haditha's courage and magnanimity survive to this day. One of the most well-known stories about Sheikh Haditha was related by Sheikh Mithgal Al-Fayez to William Buehler Seabrook who recorded it his 1927 book, Adventures in Arabia:

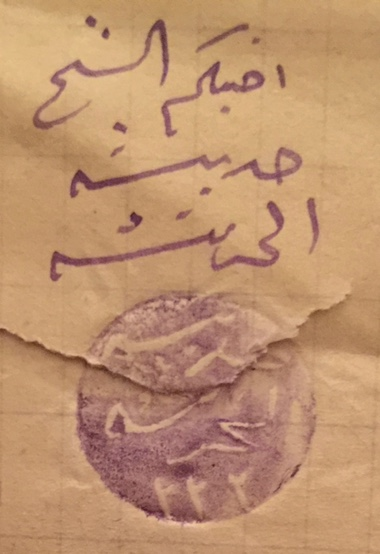
Sheikh Haditha's Seal

"We ride," said Mithkal, "to visit the menzil of a saint." And as we rode, he told me briefly the history of Haditha Pasha, sheik of the El [S]Khour. He had inherited wealth and the leadership of a powerful tribe, but his possessions and the number of his warriors had dwindled, because of his extraordinary generosity, which had become famous throughout the desert. It had made him universally honored and beloved, but it was "poor business," Mithkal pointed out, for men to spend their lives following a chief who habitually gave away three-fourths of the tribal flocks...Haditha had a white mare which he loved. A neighboring sheik name Goren...admired the mare and was very amxious to buy it. He offered Haditha three hundred gold pounds, and when he found that Haditha would not sell the mare at any price...Goren then called on him formally and said: "As we are not enemies, honor and the desert law compel me to warn you that I am going to any lengths to get your mare even if I have to steal it." Haditha replied: "I am warned."...When more than a year had passed—this event occurred in 1920, according to Mithkal—Goren learned that Haditha was planning to ride into Damascus to make arrangements about the sale of some camels...[Goren] dressed himself in the garments of a beggar and took a staff. On the morning when Haditha was to ride into Damascus, Goren took the road before him, and walked... until he was actually worn out, covered with perspiration, and in great pain. These precautions might seem theatrical and unnecessary, but the eyes of the Bedouin are keen as a hawk to penetrate disguise or sham. Goren had therefore produced in himself a condition, even down to the details of exhaustion and pain, which was not sham but real. Presently Haditha, cantering along on his white mare, overtook Goren, and as he came abreast, Goren sank into the road almost under the mare's feet. Haditha, observing the bloody bandage and the exhaustion, failed to recognize Goren because of the beard, the henna and the dirt on his face, and the kafieh which partly covered it; he halted and dismounted to help the wayfarer in distress. Goren moaned that he was on his way to Damascus and had become exhausted because of his wound. Haditha...lifted Goren to the back of his mare, held him in the saddle, and set out towards Damascus, himself on foot, letting the beggar ride. Goren kept silent for more than half an hour, giving his strength time to return; then he said: "Noble sheik, your gun is heavy on your shoulder; do, therefore, hang it here on the pommel." It was a hot day and a long road, and Haditha, suspecting nothing, acquiesced. Two or three minutes later Goren dug his heels violently into the mare and in three bounds was out of Haditha's reach. He then wheeled the horse, unslung the rifle, and returned to where Haditha stood.

"Oh! Haditha, I gave you honorable warning." Haditha recognized Goren and replied, greatly chagrined: "O Goren, you did give warning!" As Goren turned to ride away triumphantly, Haditha suddenly shouted. Goren wheeled again and returned to him. "Haditha said: "I have reflected. The mare is yours, and I will promise not to seek its return either by violence or guile, if you will promise what I ask of you."

"I promise," replied Goren. It is the custom among Bedouin sheiks to demand a promise and to acquiesce in it without saying what the bargain is—depending on each other's honor.

Haditha said: "You will promise on the name of the Prophet, and I will promise likewise, that we will tell no living soul the manner in which you obtained my mare."

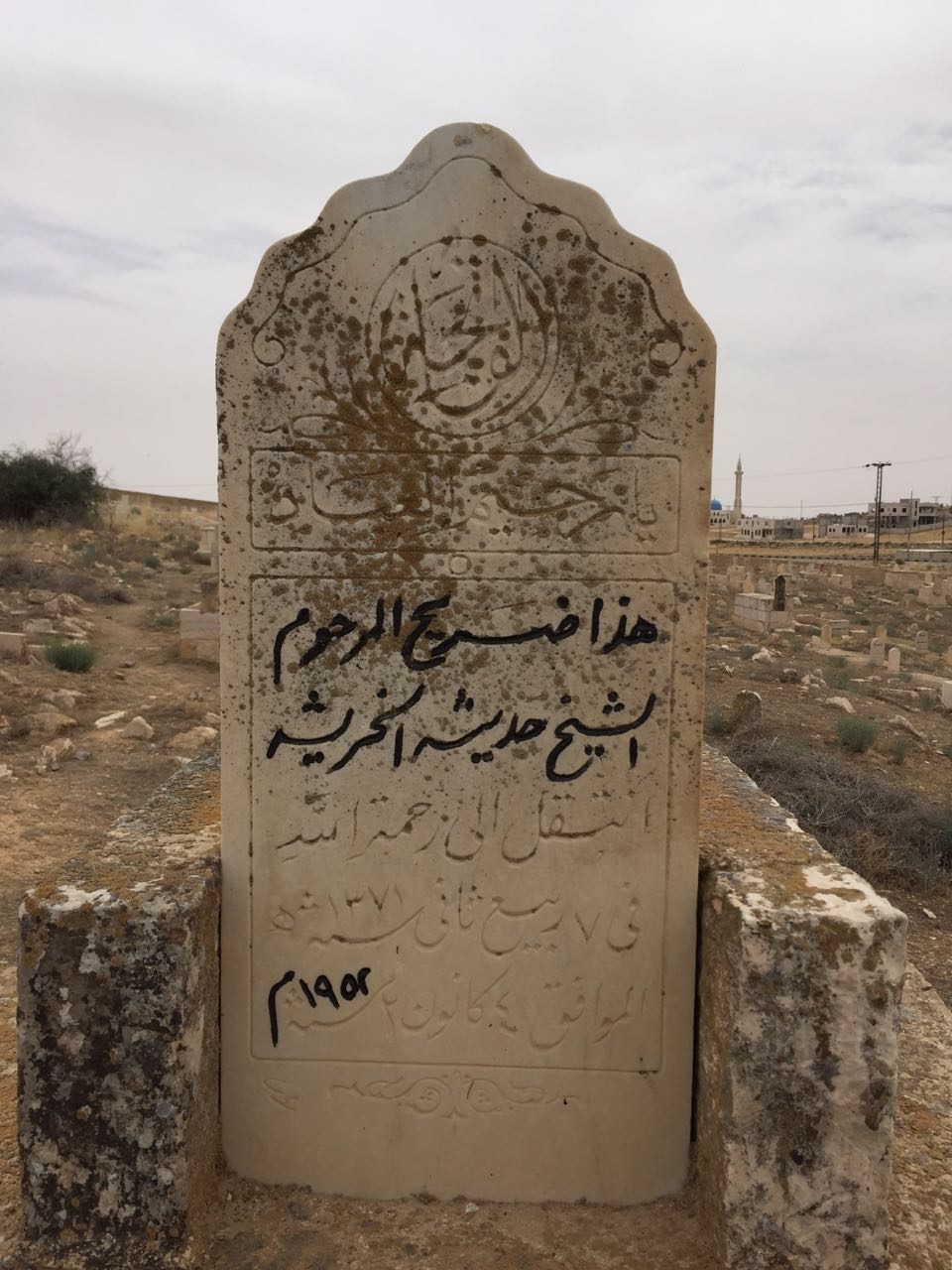
Sheikh Haditha Al-Khraisha's tomb in Al-Muwaqqar, Jordan

"I promise, O sheik! But why?" replied Goren. "Because," said Haditha, "if this tale spread from mouth to mouth in our desert, no rider would ever dare to stop and give aid to a wounded man or a beggar again, and this would be a shame greater than the loss of a thousand white mares."

Goren reflected, got down from the horses's back, put the bridle in the hands of Haditha, and said: "I cannot steal, even after honorable warning, from such an honorable man." Haditha, because of Goren's wound, helped him back into the saddle, they went together into Damascus—and remained fast friends."

== Death ==
In 1951 Sheikh Haditha performed the Hajj pilgrimage and returned to Al-Muwaqqar unwell. Sheikh Haditha died on 4 January 1952 and was buried in Al-Muwaqqar, Jordan.
