= İkiçeltik, Çermik =

Village in Turkey

İkiçeltik
- Neighbourhood
- Location in Turkey
- Coordinates: 38°01′11″N 39°25′03″E
- Country: Turkey
- Province: Diyarbakır
- District: Çermik
- Population (2022): 374
- Time zone: UTC+3 (TRT)

İkiçeltik is a neighbourhood in the municipality and district of Çermik, Diyarbakır Province in Turkey. Its population is 374 (2022).
