= Sinek, Çermik =

Village in Turkey

Sinek
- Neighbourhood
- Location in Turkey
- Coordinates: 38°09′N 39°26′E
- Country: Turkey
- Province: Diyarbakır
- District: Çermik
- Population (2022): 380
- Time zone: UTC+3 (TRT)

Sinek is a neighbourhood in the municipality and district of Çermik, Diyarbakır Province in Turkey. Its population is 380 (2022).
