= Akçörten, Çermik =

Village in Turkey

Akçörten
- Neighbourhood
- Location in Turkey
- Coordinates: 37°55′N 39°30′E
- Country: Turkey
- Province: Diyarbakır
- District: Çermik
- Population (2022): 736
- Time zone: UTC+3 (TRT)

Akçörten is a neighbourhood in the municipality and district of Çermik, Diyarbakır Province in Turkey. Its population is 736 (2022).
