= Muhammad Pasha al-Shalik =

- Monarch: Mustafa III (1757-1774)

Wali of Damascus
- In office 1760–1760
- Preceded by: Çeteci Abdullah Pasha
- Succeeded by: Uthman Pasha al-Kurji

Muhammad Pasha al-Shalik (also known as Ishalyq Mehmed Pasha, surname also spelled Jalik) was the Ottoman governor of Damascus in 1760, but he was replaced later that year by Uthman Pasha al-Kurji. He served a total of nine months as Wali of Damascus. According to historian Ahmad Hasan Joudah, the conditions under which Muhammad Pasha ruled were "unfavorable" and included devastating earthquakes, a six month-long plague that spread across Ottoman Syria from Antioch to Gaza, a massive food shortage due to the loss of much of the harvest during a frost. Unable to alleviate the situation in Damascus, Muhammad Pasha was dismissed.

== Bibliography ==
- Joudah, Ahmad Hasan (1986). Revolt in Palestine in the Eighteenth Century: The Era of Shaykh Zahir Al-ʻUmar. Kingston Press. ISBN 9780940670112.

Regnal titles
Preceded by Çeteci Abdullah Pasha	Wali of Damascus; 1760-1760	Succeeded by Uthman Pasha al-Kurji
