= Armağantaşı, Çermik =

Village in Turkey

Armağantaşı
- Neighbourhood
- Location in Turkey
- Coordinates: 38°00′N 39°09′E
- Country: Turkey
- Province: Diyarbakır
- District: Çermik
- Population (2022): 163
- Time zone: UTC+3 (TRT)

Armağantaşı is a neighbourhood in the municipality and district of Çermik, Diyarbakır Province in Turkey. Its population is 163 (2022).
