= Değirmenli, Çermik =

Village in Turkey

Değirmenli
- Neighbourhood
- Country: Turkey
- Province: Diyarbakır
- District: Çermik
- Population (2022): 25
- Time zone: UTC+3 (TRT)

Değirmenli is a neighbourhood in the municipality and district of Çermik, Diyarbakır Province in Turkey. Its population is 25 (2022). It is 108 km from Diyarbakır city center and 15 km from Çermik district.
