= Elifuşağı, Çermik =

Village in Turkey

Elifuşağı
- Neighbourhood
- Location in Turkey
- Coordinates: 38°10′44″N 39°23′46″E
- Country: Turkey
- Province: Diyarbakır
- District: Çermik
- Population (2022): 425
- Time zone: UTC+3 (TRT)

Elifuşağı is a neighbourhood in the municipality and district of Çermik, Diyarbakır Province in Turkey. Its population is 425 (2022).
