= Alabuğday, Çermik =

Village in Turkey

Alabuğday
- Neighbourhood
- Location in Turkey
- Coordinates: 38°00′N 39°29′E
- Country: Turkey
- Province: Diyarbakır
- District: Çermik
- Population (2022): 669
- Time zone: UTC+3 (TRT)

Alabuğday is a neighbourhood in the municipality and district of Çermik, Diyarbakır Province in Turkey. Its population is 669 (2022).
