= Piratman =

- Municipality
- Location within Azerbaijan
- Coordinates: 39°42′N 48°57′E
- Country: Azerbaijan
- Rayon: Salyan

Population
  - Total: 926
- Time zone: UTC+4 (AZT)
  - Summer (DST): UTC+5 (AZT)

Piratman (also, Ganzhali-Piratman) is a village and municipality in the Salyan Rayon of Azerbaijan. It has a population of 926. The municipality consists of the villages of Piratman and Gəncəli.
