= Recep, Çermik =

Village in Turkey

Recep
- Neighbourhood
- Diyarbakir in Turkey
- Country: Turkey
- Province: Diyarbakır
- District: Çermik
- Population (2022): 214
- Time zone: UTC+3 (TRT)
- Postal code: 21600
- Area code: 0412

Recep is a neighbourhood in the municipality and district of Çermik, Diyarbakır Province in Turkey. Its population was 214 (2022).
