= Kalaç =

Kalaç may refer to:

- Kalaç, Çermik, a village in Diyarbakır Province, Turkey
- Kalaç, Gerede, a village in Bolu Province, Turkey
- Aslı Kalaç (born 1995), Turkish volleyball player
