= Husayn Pasha ibn Makki =

- Monarchs: Osman III (1754-1757); Mustafa III (1757-1774); Abdul Hamid I (1774-1789)

Wali of Damascus
- In office 25 February 1757 – December 1757
- Preceded by: As'ad Pasha al-Azm
- Succeeded by: Çeteci Abdullah Pasha

Wali of Marash
- In office 1762–1762

Sanjak-Bey of Gaza
- In office 1763–1765

Personal details
- Born: Gaza, Damascus Eyalet, Ottoman Empire
- Died: 1765 Gaza region, Damascus Eyalet, Ottoman Empire

Husayn Pasha ibn Makki (Arabic: حسين باشا بن مكي, romanized: Ḥusayn Bāshā ibn Makkī; known in Turkish as Mekkizâde Hüseyin Paşa) (died 1765) served as the Ottoman wali (provincial governor) of Damascus (1757) and Marash (1762), and the sanjak-bey (district governor) of his native Gaza (1763–1765).

== Origins ==
Husayn Pasha ibn Makki was an Arab from Gaza, and one of the few ethnic Arab governors (the other Arab governors were mostly members of the al-Azm family) who had governed Ottoman Damascus. Husayn's grandfather was a native and merchant of Gaza. Husayn's father Muhammad served as a one-time kahya (steward) for As'ad Pasha al-Azm, the governor of Damascus Eyalet (Province of Damascus), and was granted the malikane (a type of ownership) of Gaza Sanjak, a district of Damascus Eyalet.

== Governor of Damascus ==
Husayn Pasha was appointed Governor of Damascus in February 1757 to replace the deposed long-time governor, As'ad Pasha al-Azm. His term in office was short-lived and marked by chaos and violence in the city of Damascus. As he entered office on 25 February a price hike for bread in the city spiked due to the short supply of grain as a result of the severe winter that preceded his rule. A popular uprising protesting the prices took place in the city. Damascene notables heading to Husayn Pasha's residence to welcome him were assaulted by some protesters and vocally condemned for alleged grain hoarding and "exploiting the poor and miserable". Husayn Pasha responded by ordering an investigation and soon after the prices decreased and calm was restored. However, this was short-lived and the prices rose within a few months. In the summer of 1757, mass violence spread throughout Damascus as rival factions of Janissaries fought each other and besieged rival neighborhoods, while a popular revolt caused many mercenaries stationed in the city to flee.

=== Assault of the Hajj caravan ===
As Governor of Damascus, Husayn Pasha was also the amir al-hajj (commander of the annual Hajj pilgrim caravan to Mecca). In April 1757, he went on a tour of the province's villages to collect the taxes imposed for funding the supply and protection of the caravan, and in June he led the caravan in its departure from Damascus. Husayn Pasha led it safely to Mecca, but on the return to Damascus, the caravan's jurdah (advance guard) was assaulted by a coalition of Bedouin tribes led Qa'dan Al-Fayez of the Bani Sakhr in al-Qatranah near al-Karak. Its commander Musa Pasha was wounded and died seeking help in Daraa, while most of the jurdah dispersed, fleeing to Hauran, Gaza, Jerusalem or Ma'an. Reinforcements were sent from Damascus, but went no further than al-Balqa. When Husayn Pasha, now in the northern Hejaz, realized reinforcements were not arriving, he attempted to bribe al-Fa'iz, but to no avail. The Bedouin tribes launched a massive assault against the caravan south of Tabuk in October, looting it and massacred Muslim pilgrims, including the sister of Ottoman sultan Osman III, in the process. About 20,000 pilgrims were killed by the Bedouin or died of thirst or excessive heat.

There were various reasons the Bedouin launched the assault, such as the drought that struck the region prior to the attack, but the main reason was the financial gain they saw in looting the caravan to compensate for the loss of much of their territory and income to the Anizzah tribes of Najd, who invaded much of the Syrian Desert in the years prior. Prior to making the Hajj, Husayn Pasha refused to pay the traditional protection fee to the Bani Saqr, paying the Anizzah instead. However, Husayn Pasha held the autonomous Arab ruler of northern Palestine, Zahir al-Umar, as culpable. Husayn Pasha saw it as a priority to subdue Zahir and annex his territories (which were part of Sidon Eyalet) and believed Zahir, who maintained close ties with the Bani Saqr, incited the Bedouin tribes to raid the caravan. Zahir denied the allegation and purchased the looted goods, including Sultan Osman III's decorated banner, in order to return them to the sultanate and prove his loyalty. The Ottoman authorities remained suspicious of Zahir nonetheless, and also believed that ex-governor As'ad Pasha had a hand in the raid since no attacks against the caravan had occurred during his 15-year governorship. The latter was arrested and was executed on the way to a prison in Crete.

Husayn Pasha did not return to Damascus with the surviving pilgrims and his absence left a political void in the city. The yerliyya Janissaries revolted, causing businesses in Damascus to shutter and prices of bread to more than double, leading to more riots in the city. As a result of his failure to protect the caravan, Husayn Pasha was dismissed from office by the end of the year.

== Later career ==
Husayn Pasha was exiled to his native Gaza after his dismissal, but was later assigned Governor of Marash Eyalet in Anatolia in 1762. He served there for less than a year before being appointed sanjak-bey (district governor) of Gaza. He served as Governor of Gaza until he was killed in a confrontation with the Bani Sakhr and Wuhaydat tribes in Gaza's general vicinity in 1765.

== Bibliography ==
- Barbir, Karl K. (2014). Ottoman Rule in Damascus, 1708-1758. Princeton University Press. ISBN 9781400853205.
- Grehan, James (2007). Everyday Life and Consumer Culture in Eighteenth-Century Damascus. University of Washington Press. ISBN 9780295801636.
- Holt, Peter Malcolm (1966). Egypt and the Fertile Crescent 1516-1922. Cornell University Press. "Makki."
- Joudah, Ahmad Hasan (1987). Revolt in Palestine in the Eighteenth Century: The Era of Shaykh Zahir Al-ʻUmar. Kingston Press. ISBN 9780940670112.
- Rafeq, Abdul-Karim (1966). The Province of Damascus, 1723-1783. Damascus: Khayats.

Regnal titles
Preceded by As'ad Pasha al-Azm	Wali of Damascus; 1757-1757	Succeeded by Çeteci Abdullah Pasha
