= Kırmatepe, Çermik =

Village in Turkey

Kırmatepe
- Neighbourhood
- Location in Turkey
- Coordinates: 38°05′N 39°30′E
- Country: Turkey
- Province: Diyarbakır
- District: Çermik
- Population (2022): 338
- Time zone: UTC+3 (TRT)

Kırmatepe is a neighbourhood in the municipality and district of Çermik, Diyarbakır Province in Turkey. Its population is 338 (2022).
