= Gəncəli, Khachmaz =

Ganjali
- Azerbaijani: Gəncəli
- Location within Azerbaijan
- Coordinates: 41°30′33″N 48°51′26″E
- Country: Azerbaijan
- District: Khachmaz
- Municipality: Khaspoladoba
- Time zone: UTC+4 (AZT)
  - Summer (DST): UTC+5 (AZT)

Gəncəli (also, Ganjali) is a village in the Khachmaz District of Azerbaijan. The village forms part of the municipality of Khaspoladoba.
