= Bahçe, Çermik =

Village in Turkey

Bahçe
- Neighbourhood
- Location in Turkey
- Coordinates: 38.1220°N 39.3895°E
- Country: Turkey
- Province: Diyarbakır
- District: Çermik
- Population (2022): 555
- Time zone: UTC+3 (TRT)

Bahçe is a neighbourhood in the municipality and district of Çermik, Diyarbakır Province in Turkey. Its population is 555 (2022).
