= Petekkaya, Çermik =

Village in Turkey

Petekkaya
- Neighbourhood
- Location in Turkey
- Coordinates: 38°05′42″N 39°26′10″E
- Country: Turkey
- Province: Diyarbakır
- District: Çermik
- Population (2022): 1,313
- Time zone: UTC+3 (TRT)

Petekkaya is a neighbourhood in the municipality and district of Çermik, Diyarbakır Province in Turkey. Its population is 1,313 (2022).
