= Yeşilova, Çermik =

Village in Turkey

Yeşilova
- Neighbourhood
- Location in Turkey
- Coordinates: 38°2′56″N 39°36′36″E
- Country: Turkey
- Province: Diyarbakır
- District: Çermik
- Population (2022): 1,042
- Time zone: UTC+3 (TRT)

Yeşilova is a neighbourhood in the municipality and district of Çermik, Diyarbakır Province in Turkey. Its population is 1,042 (2022).
