= Babalı, Jalilabad =

Babalı
- Municipality
- Location within Azerbaijan
- Coordinates: 39°14′40″N 48°20′20″E
- Country: Azerbaijan
- Rayon: Jalilabad

Population
  - Total: 737
- Time zone: UTC+4 (AZT)

Babalı (also, Babaly) is a village and municipality in the Jalilabad Rayon of Azerbaijan. It has a population of 737.
