= Akkoyunlu, Çermik =

Village in Turkey

Akkoyunlu
- Neighbourhood
- Location in Turkey
- Coordinates: 38.0946°N 39.6147°E
- Country: Turkey
- Province: Diyarbakır
- District: Çermik
- Population (2022): 505
- Time zone: UTC+3 (TRT)

Akkoyunlu is a neighbourhood in the municipality and district of Çermik, Diyarbakır Province in Turkey. Its population is 505 (2022).
