= İncili Çavuş =

İncili Çavuş (Note: Çavuş means: 1. a title given to the officials who engaged in various services provided of in the organizations of the Ottoman State, 2. a rank of officers who were responsible for transmitting down orders of senior commanders subordinate commanders in the Ottoman Army. çavuş in BSTS / Tarih Terimleri Sözlüğü, 1974. (in Turkish)) or Mustafa Çavuş was a figure of comic wisdom during the Ottoman era. He may possibly have been a real person.

His birth date is not known. There are several theories about his birthplace. According to Kayseri Ansiklopedisi, he was born in the village of Tırafşın, now called İncili of Tomarza District in Kayseri Province.

His fıkras (jokes) were collected by Süleyman Tevfik (Zorluoğlu) at the first time in the early Republican period, 1923. According to Abdülbaki Gölpınarlı, Çavuş's treatise, that had been addressed to Sheikh ul-Islam at the time and written in both Arabic and Turkish languages, was found in Kayseri in 1933–1934. In two small treatises in a volume, it was mentioned that the name of Muhammad were passed in the Bible (Turkish: İncil). In this way, they gave him the nickname "İncili" (with Bible).

As to another tale, Sultan Suleiman the Magnificent (reigned 1520–1566) was very pleased with Mustafa's showing extraordinary proficiency in an archery contest that was participated by his princes, and said to Mustafa, "I'm giving you the rank of a Çavuş (a high rank in the palace). And to be able to distinguish you from other çavuşes and to show your superiority over others, I'm attaching a pearl to your turban." After this affair, his name Mustafa was forgotten and he began to be called "İncili".

According to Mustafa Enhoş, he was referred in the History of Naima as a member of the Dergâhı Âlî in 1615. According to Sennur Sezer and Adnan Özyalçıner, he was one of Musahibs of Sultan Ahmed I (reignrd 1603–1617) and was sent to Safavid Persia as part of the Ottoman delegation (elçi). According to Kayseri Ansiklopedisi, some sources recorded that he accompanied İbrahim Çavuş, who was sent to Iran as ambassador, as "selam çavuşu" in 1626.

According to Cemil Asena's book Diyarbekir Tarihi ve Meşâhiri, he died in 1632–33. However, sources were unclear on the exact date.

== See also ==
- Nasreddin Hoca
