= Gəncəli, Salyan =

Ganjali
- Azerbaijani: Gəncəli
- Location within Azerbaijan
- Coordinates: 39°41′N 48°58′E
- Country: Azerbaijan
- District: Salyan
- Municipality: Piratman
- Time zone: UTC+4 (AZT)
  - Summer (DST): UTC+5 (AZT)

Gəncəli (also, Ganjali and Parcha-Ganjali) is a village in the Salyan District of Azerbaijan. The village forms part of the municipality of Piratman.
