= Artuk, Çermik =

Village in Turkey

Artuk
- Neighbourhood
- Location in Turkey
- Coordinates: 38°10′N 39°31′E
- Country: Turkey
- Province: Diyarbakır
- District: Çermik
- Population (2022): 296
- Time zone: UTC+3 (TRT)

Artuk is a neighbourhood in the municipality and district of Çermik, Diyarbakır Province in Turkey. Its population is 296 (2022).
