= Kalaç, Çermik =

Village in Turkey

Kalaç
- Neighbourhood
- Country: Turkey
- Province: Diyarbakır
- District: Çermik
- Population (2022): 165
- Time zone: UTC+3 (TRT)

Kalaç is a neighbourhood in the municipality and district of Çermik, Diyarbakır Province in Turkey. Its population is 165 (2022).
