= Basari language =

Basari may be:

- The Bassari language of Guinea
- The Ntcham language of Togo
