= Çukurelma, Çermik =

Village in Turkey

Çukurelma
- Neighbourhood
- Location in Turkey
- Coordinates: 38.006°N 39.141°E
- Country: Turkey
- Province: Diyarbakır
- District: Çermik
- Population (2022): 56
- Time zone: UTC+3 (TRT)

Çukurelma is a neighbourhood in the municipality and district of Çermik, Diyarbakır Province in Turkey. Its population is 56 (2022).
