= Kömürcüler, Çermik =

Village in Turkey

Kömürcüler
- Neighbourhood
- Country: Turkey
- Province: Diyarbakır
- District: Çermik
- Population (2022): 218
- Time zone: UTC+3 (TRT)

Kömürcüler is a neighbourhood in the municipality and district of Çermik, Diyarbakır Province in Turkey. Its population is 218 (2022).
