= Bayrak, Çermik =

Village in Turkey

Bayrak
- Neighbourhood
- Location in Turkey
- Coordinates: 38°03′04″N 39°22′01″E
- Country: Turkey
- Province: Diyarbakır
- District: Çermik
- Population (2022): 190
- Time zone: UTC+3 (TRT)

Bayrak is a neighbourhood in the municipality and district of Çermik, Diyarbakır Province in Turkey. Its population is 190 (2022).
