= Genceli, Çermik =

Village in Turkey

Genceli
- Neighbourhood
- Country: Turkey
- Province: Diyarbakır
- District: Çermik
- Population (2022): 33
- Time zone: UTC+3 (TRT)

Genceli is a neighbourhood in the Chermik District of Diyarbakir Province in Turkey. Its population is 33 (2022).
