= Başarı, Çermik =

Village in Turkey

Başarı
- Neighbourhood
- Location in Turkey
- Coordinates: 38.0982°N 39.5216°E
- Country: Turkey
- Province: Diyarbakır
- District: Çermik
- Population (2022): 450
- Time zone: UTC+3 (TRT)

Başarı is a neighbourhood in the municipality and district of Çermik, Diyarbakır Province in Turkey. Its population is 450 (2022).
