= Aynalı, Çermik =

Village in Turkey

Aynalı
- Neighbourhood
- Location in Turkey
- Coordinates: 38.1010°N 39.4541°E
- Country: Turkey
- Province: Diyarbakır
- District: Çermik
- Population (2022): 1,080
- Time zone: UTC+3 (TRT)

Aynalı is a neighbourhood in the municipality and district of Çermik, Diyarbakır Province in Turkey. Its population is 1,080 (2022).
