= Babalı, Khachmaz =

Babali
- Azerbaijani: Bəbəli
- Location within Azerbaijan
- Coordinates: 41°30′N 48°52′E
- Country: Azerbaijan
- Rayon: Khachmaz
- Municipality: Khaspoladoba
- Time zone: UTC+4 (AZT)
  - Summer (DST): UTC+5 (AZT)

Bəbəli (also, Babali, Bebeli, and Babaly) is a village in the Khachmaz District of Azerbaijan. The village forms part of the municipality of Khaspoladoba.
