= Sarıca, Azerbaijan =

Sarıca
- Municipality
- Location within Azerbaijan Location within Shaki-Zagatala Economic Region
- Coordinates: 40°52′32″N 47°20′10″E
- Country: Azerbaijan
- Rayon: Shaki

Population
  - Total: 1,004
- Time zone: UTC+4 (AZT)
  - Summer (DST): UTC+5 (AZT)

Sarıca is a village and municipality in the Shaki Rayon of Azerbaijan. It has a population of 1,004.
