= Basri, West Azerbaijan =

Basri بصري
- Village
- Location within Iran
- Coordinates: 36°46′27″N 45°48′36″E
- Country: Iran
- Province: West Azerbaijan
- County: Mahabad
- Bakhsh: Central
- Rural District: Akhtachi-ye Gharbi

Population (2006)
  - Total: 59
- Time zone: UTC+3:30 (IRST)
  - Summer (DST): UTC+4:30 (IRDT)

Basri (Persian: بصري, also romanized as Başrī) is a village in Akhtachi-ye Gharbi Rural District, in the Central District of Mahabad County, West Azerbaijan province, Iran. At the 2006 census, its population was 59, in 24 families.

Basri Village is a Leper Colony.
