= Konaklı, Çermik =

Village in Turkey

Konaklı
- Neighbourhood
- Country: Turkey
- Province: Diyarbakır
- District: Çermik
- Population (2022): 61
- Time zone: UTC+3 (TRT)

Konaklı is a neighbourhood in the municipality and district of Çermik, Diyarbakır Province in Turkey. Its population is 61 (2022).
