= 1757 Hajj caravan raid =

1757 raid on a Hajj caravan

Date	September – late-October 1757
Location	Al-Qatranah (Damascus Eyalet) and Hallat Ammar (Jeddah Eyalet), Ottoman Empire
Result	Hajj caravan plundered and pilgrims killed

Belligerents
Ottoman Empire	Bedouin tribes: Bani Sakher; Sardiyah; Bani Aqil; Bani Kulayb

Commanders and leaders
(Ottoman Empire) Husayn Pasha ibn Makki (amir al-hajj) (Ottoman Empire) Musa Pasha †	Qa'dan al-Fayez (Bani Sakher chief)

Strength
Unknown	Unknown

Casualties and losses
Unknown	Unknown
- ~20,000 pilgrims killed or died of starvation/thirst

The 1757 Hajj caravan raid was the plunder and massacre of the Hajj caravan of 1757 on its return to Damascus from Mecca by Bedouin tribesmen. The caravan was under the protection of an Ottoman force led by the Wali (provincial governor) of Damascus, Husayn Pasha, and his deputy Musa Pasha, while the Bedouin were led by Qa'dan al-Fayez of the Bani Sakher tribe. An estimated 20,000 pilgrims were either killed or died of hunger or thirst as a result of the raid.

Although Bedouin raids on the Hajj caravan were fairly common, the 1757 raid represented the peak of such attacks. Historian Aref Abu-Rabia called it the "most famous" raid against a Hajj caravan. The attack caused a crisis in the Ottoman Government. Husayn Pasha was dismissed and senior officials such as the kizlar agha (chief eunuch), Aboukouf, and the former wali of Damascus, As'ad Pasha al-Azm, were executed for their alleged negligence or involvement, respectively.

== Background ==
Performing the Hajj (annual Muslim pilgrimage to Mecca) is a sacred duty in Islam. During the Ottoman era (1517–1917), as in previous periods, Muslim pilgrims from the Levant and Anatolia would assemble in Damascus and travel together in a caravan stocked with goods and foodstuffs to Mecca under an armed guard led by the amir al-hajj (commander of the Hajj caravan). The armed guard was present mainly to protect the caravan from Bedouin assaults as it traversed various Bedouin tribes' territories in the desert.

Major looting raids against the caravan normally occurred when the tribes were experiencing economic hardships. The Bedouin would typically be paid off by the amir al-hajj through a sarr (tribute) payment in return for safe passage through their territory. The sarr money came from the tax revenues collected by the amir al-hajj from the inhabitants of Damascus Eyalet earmarked specifically for the Hajj caravan's protection and supply. Often, an amir al-hajj would pay half of the sarr to the most powerful Bedouin tribes en route to Mecca, and pay the other half on the return if the circumstances necessitated it. If the Bedouin tribes did not threaten the caravan on the return trip, the amir al-hajj would keep the remainder of the sarr payment to himself. Many times, despite payment of the sarr, the Bedouin tribes would loot the caravan regardless, though to a lesser extent. The tribes also received income from selling transport camels to pilgrims. In addition, Bedouin tribesmen were enlisted to serve as the caravan's auxiliary troops because of their familiarity with the territory and the predominantly Bedouin population that inhabited the areas along the route to Mecca. Thus, the Hajj caravan was a lucrative source of income for the tribes.

In the decades prior to the 1757 raid, the predominant Bedouin tribes in the region between Damascus and the northern Hejaz were the Bani Sakher and the smaller tribes of the Bani Aqil, the Bani Kulayb and the Sardiyah. However, beginning in the early 18th century, the much larger Anizzah tribe from Najd overran the Syrian Desert, displacing the other tribes. Consequently, the Ottoman commanders leading the Hajj gradually transferred the traditional duties normally entrusted with the Bani Sakher and its allies to the Anizzah. This deprived the former of a major income source and the religiously prestigious role of protecting the Muslim pilgrims. The Bani Sakher and the Anizzah partook in joint raids against the Hajj caravan in 1700 and 1703. The financial hardship of the Bani Sakher and the lesser tribes was exacerbated by a severe drought in 1756 and 1757.

== The raid ==
After having completed his dawrah (tax collection tour) in April 1757, amir al-hajj and wali of Damascus, Husayn Pasha ibn Makki, departed with the pilgrim caravan in July, and it arrived safely in Mecca several weeks after. As the caravan set off for its return to Syria, the caravan's smaller advance guard under commander Musa Pasha was assaulted by Bani Sakher tribesmen commanded by Qa'dan al-Fayez at al-Qatranah, in central modern-day Jordan. The guard was plundered and dispersed, with soldiers fleeing south to Ma'an, southwest to Gaza, west to Jerusalem and north to the Hauran plain. Musa Pasha was personally attacked and managed to escape to the Hauran town of Daraa "nude and barefooted", according to historian Abbud al-Sabbagh. Musa later died of his wounds.

Surviving soldiers of the advance guard arrived at Damascus to alert the authorities, who afterward dispatched a relief guard to support the main caravan, which by late September had reached the northern Hejaz town of Tabuk. The relief guard was attacked by the tribesmen at an area between al-Qatranah and Ma'an, and was not able to proceed much further than the Balqa plain. Husayn Pasha had also been alerted of the advance guard's plunder and the relief guard's dispersal, and attempted to reach out to Sheikh Qa'dan. Husayn Pasha's representatives offered Sheikh Qa'dan a bribe in exchange for safe passage to Damascus, but were rebuffed.

The caravan's provisions were running low, and Husayn Pasha departed Tabuk with the caravan in late October with knowledge that the Bani Sakher and allied tribesmen, including the smaller Sardiyah, Bani Aqil and Bani Kulayb, awaited them on the route. On the third day of Husayn Pasha's march, the Bedouin tribesmen launched their assault on the caravan between Tabuk and Dhat al-Hajj. According to historian F. E. Peters, the site of the assault was Hallat Ammar, on the Tabuk-Ma'an road at the border between modern-day Jordan and Saudi Arabia.

At the immediate outset of the raid, numerous pilgrims were killed. The Bedouin tribesmen plundered the caravan of its remaining provisions and goods and withdrew. Among the looted items was the highly decorated mahmal (litter) that represented the sovereignty of the Ottoman Sultan. Some 20,000 pilgrims were either killed by the attackers, died of their wounds, or died of hunger or thirst on the way back to Damascus. Among the dead pilgrims was one of the sisters of the Sultan himself. Husayn Pasha survived, but did not return to Damascus, fearing for his safety. The 18th-century Damascus-based chronicler Ahmed al-Budeiri recorded that pilgrims, men and women, were stripped of their clothing and left naked in the desert by the Bedouin raiders.

== Aftermath ==
The raid shocked people across the Ottoman Empire, and the authorities in Damascus and the Ottoman capital, Istanbul. Although Bedouin raids on the Hajj caravan were fairly common, the 1757 raid represented the peak of such attacks. Historian Aref Abu-Rabia called it the "most famous" Bedouin raid against a Hajj caravan.

A crisis ensued in the Ottoman Government. Sultan Osman III died on 30 October 1757 and was succeeded by Mustafa III. The latter punished a number of imperial and provincial officials he held responsible for failing to secure the caravan. Husayn Pasha was immediately dismissed as amir al-hajj and wali of Damascus and ultimately reassigned as sanjak-bey (district governor) of Gaza in 1762. Husayn Pasha submitted a complaint to the imperial authorities, alleging that the powerful Arab sheikh of the Galilee, Daher al-Umar, incited the Bedouin tribes to launch the raid, which Daher denied. Daher requested an investigation into the matter and the authorities concluded that he was not involved in the raid. Moreover, Daher curried favor with the authorities by buying the looted goods from the Bani Sakher and returning the mahmal to the Sultan.

Husayn Pasha's imperial patron and an official with some responsibilities regarding the Hajj caravan, the kizlar agha Aboukouf, was arrested, exiled to Rhodes and executed. Aboukouf's severed head was placed outside the imperial palace in Istanbul. The official justification for his death was his appointment of Husayn Pasha and dismissal of the former wali of Damascus and amir al-hajj, As'ad Pasha al-Azm, who had successfully led the pilgrimage throughout his 14-year reign. However, As'ad Pasha was also punished due to suspicions that he collaborated with the Bedouin raiders to attack the caravan in order to discredit his successor Husayn Pasha and persuade the imperial authorities to restore him to office. According to Ahmad Hasan Joudah, As'ad Pasha was exiled to Crete, but was executed on his way there, in March 1758. His severed head was also displayed in front of the Sultan's palace.

== Legacy ==
The raid was the most prominent example of the increasing failure of the Ottoman-sponsored overland routes of pilgrimage to the holy land in the mid-eighteenth century. A decline in the overland hajj route to Mecca and Medina, and to Jerusalem, followed and was increasingly superseded by sea routes.

== See also ==
- List of massacres in Ottoman Syria

== Bibliography ==
- Abu-Rabia, Aref (2001). A Bedouin Century: Education and Development Among the Negev Tribes in the 20th Century. Berghahn Books. ISBN 9781571818324.
- Burns, Ross (2005). Damascus: A History. Routledge. ISBN 0-415-27105-3.
- Cohen, Amnon (1973). Palestine in the 18th century: Patterns of Government and Administration. Magnes Press. ISBN 9789652234834.
- Al-Damurdashi, Ahmad D. (1991). Abd al-Wahhāb Bakr Muḥammad (ed.). Al-Damurdashi's Chronicle of Egypt, 1688–1755. BRILL. ISBN 9789004094086.
- Joudah, Ahmad Hasan (1987). Revolt in Palestine in the Eighteenth Century: The Era of Shaykh Zahir Al-ʻUmar. Kingston Press. ISBN 9780940670112.
- Hathaway, Jane; Barbir, Karl (2014). The Arab Lands Under Ottoman Rule: 1516–1800. Routledge. ISBN 9781317875635.
- Özyüksel, Murat (2014). The Hejaz Railway and the Ottoman Empire: Modernity, Industrialisation and Ottoman Decline. I.B.Tauris. ISBN 9780857737434.
- Peters, F. E. (1994). The Hajj: The Muslim Pilgrimage to Mecca and the Holy Places. Princeton University Press. ISBN 9780691026190.
- Sato, Tsugitaka (2014). Sugar in the Social Life of Medieval Islam. BRILL. ISBN 9789004281561.
- Van der Steen, Eveline (2014). Near Eastern Tribal Societies During the Nineteenth Century: Economy, Society and Politics Between Tent and Town. Routledge. ISBN 9781317543480.
