= Əzizli =

Azizli
- Azerbaijani: Əzizli
- Location within Azerbaijan
- Coordinates: 41°30′23″N 48°49′12″E
- Country: Azerbaijan
- Rayon: Khachmaz
- Municipality: Khaspoladoba
- Time zone: UTC+4 (AZT)
  - Summer (DST): UTC+5 (AZT)

Əzizli (also, Azizli, known as Aronovka until 1992) is a village in the Khachmaz District of Azerbaijan. The village forms part of the municipality of Khaspoladoba.
