= Uthman Pasha al-Kurji =

Ottoman governor of Damascus from 1760 to 1771

Wali of Damascus
- In office 1760 – October 1771
- Preceded by: Muhammad Pasha al-Shalik
- Succeeded by: Muhammad Pasha al-Azm

Personal details
- Children: Muhammad; Darwish

Uthman Pasha al-Kurji (also known as Uthman Pasha al-Sadiq, alternative spellings include Othman, Osman or Usman and al-Kurdji or Kurzi), was the Ottoman governor (wali) of Damascus Eyalet between 1760 and 1771.

== Early life and career ==
Uthman had Georgian origins. Prior to his appointment to the governorship of Damascus, Uthman Pasha was a mamluk (slave soldier) of Governor As'ad Pasha al-Azm and thus maintained close links with the powerful al-Azm family. When As'ad Pasha was removed from his post by the Sublime Porte, he was succeeded by a number of short-term governors who were unable to halt the violence between the local forces and the Janissary garrison in the city.

== Governor of Damascus ==
Uthman Pasha was appointed governor of Damascus Eyalet in 1761. He was nominated to this position as a reward for directing the Ottoman imperial authorities to As'ad Pasha's hidden stores of wealth. In addition to the governorship of Damascus, he was appointed beylerbey (governor-general) of the adjacent Tripoli Eyalet and awarded contracts for the districts of Hama and Homs. His rule brought stability to the province and he lowered its inhabitants' taxes.

As governor, one of Uthman Pasha's principal goals was to bring an end to the autonomous rule of Daher al-Umar, who ruled the Galilee (largely part of Sidon Eyalet) and some of its neighboring regions. al-Umar had previously clashed with the al-Azm governors of Damascus and Sidon and when he annexed the port city of Haifa in 1761, Uthman Pasha began making moves against Daher. Uthman Pasha obtained an order from the Porte to officially annex Haifa to Damascus Eyalet and he dispatched a ship from Beirut with 30 soldiers and a French captain to take the port. Daher, having had advance notice of this action, had the ship confiscated and its crew arrested. In 1764, Uthman launched an attack against the Jarrar family under their sheikh, Muhammad al-Jarrar, attacking their throne village of Sanur and the city of Nablus. Uthman's forces were defeated.

Also in 1764, while Uthman was leading the annual Hajj pilgrimage, he had a violent confrontation with Ali Bey al-Kabir, an influential mamluk from Egypt. When Ali Bey was exiled by the governor of Egypt to Gaza (part of Damascus Eyalet) in 1766, Uthman attempted to drive him out. Uthman managed to have his son, Darwish Pasha, appointed as the governor of Sidon in November 1770 and sometime prior to that, had his other son, Muhammad Pasha, appointed as governor of Tripoli. In 1771, Ali Bey, by now the rebellious governor of Egypt, had dispatched an army under commanders Abu al-Dahab and Ismail Bey to subdue Damascus. Together with Daher, the combined armies of Egypt and Palestine defeated Uthman's army outside of Damascus and Uthman fled north to the city of Homs. The city fell shortly thereafter, although they did not capture the Citadel of Damascus, which was subsequently besieged. However, Abu al-Dahab suddenly withdrew from the area, citing his fears of violating Islamic principles since seizing an Ottoman province was in effect a direct challenge to the authority of the Ottoman sultan, who held the highest religious honor as the caliph of Islam.

== Removal from office ==
In October 1771, Uthman was removed from governorship of Damascus and also was stripped of his control over the district of Maarrat al-Nu'man. He was succeeded by Muhammad Pasha al-Azm. Uthman was transferred to the governorship of Konya and his sons Muhammad Pasha and Darwish Pasha were dismissed from their posts and subsequently assigned to the governorships of Mosul and Karaman, respectively. Uthman succeeded in protecting the Hajj caravans for ten years as amir al-hajj and consistently attempted to end the autonomous rule of Daher al-Umar, and thus his failure to defend Damascus from the Egyptian army was the likely reason for his reassignment. When Muhammad Pasha al-Azm died in 1783, he was succeeded by Uthman Pasha's son Muhammad Pasha and a year later by his other son Darwish Pasha.

== Bibliography ==
- Burns, Ross (2005). Damascus: A History. London: Routledge. ISBN 0-415-27105-3..
- Doumani, B. (1995). Rediscovering Palestine: Merchants and Peasants in Jabal Nablus. University of California Press.
- Crecelius, Daniel (1981). The Roots of Modern Egypt: A Study of the Regimes of 'Ali Bey Al-Kabir and Muhammad Bey Abu Al-Dhahab, 1760-1775. Bibliotheca Islamica. ISBN 9780882970295.
- Elisseeff, N. (1954). "Ma'arrat al-Nu'man". In Hamilton Alexander Rosskeen Gibb (ed.). The Encyclopaedia of Islam. Vol. 5. Brill Archive.
- Gray, Richard (1975). The Cambridge History of Africa. Vol. 4. Cambridge University Press. ISBN 9780521204132.
- Holt, P.M. (1966). Egypt and the Fertile Crescent 1516-1922. Ithaca, N.Y., Cornell University Press. ISBN 9780801490798. "uthman sadiq."
- Joudah, Ahmad Hasan (1986). Revolt in Palestine in the Eighteenth Century: The Era of Shaykh Zahir Al-ʻUmar. Kingston Press. ISBN 9780940670112.
- Parkes, James William (1949). A History of Palestine from 135 A.D. to Modern Times. Oxford University Press. "1764."
- Patai, R. (1967). Golden River to Golden Road: Society, Culture, and Change in the Middle East. University of Pennsylvania Press.
- Philipp, Thomas (2013). Acre: The Rise and Fall of a Palestinian City, 1730-1831. Columbia University Press. ISBN 9780231506038.
- Rogan, E. (2012). The Arabs: A History. Basic Books. ISBN 9780465032488.
- Salzmann, Ariel (2004). Tocqueville in the Ottoman Empire: rival paths to the modern state. BRILL. ISBN 978-90-04-10887-5.
- Yazbak, M. (1998). Haifa in the Late Ottoman Period, A Muslim Town in Transition, 1864–1914. Brill Academic Pub. ISBN 90-04-11051-8.
- Zertal, A. (2007). The Manasseh Hill Country Survey. Vol. 2. Boston: BRILL. ISBN 978-9004163690.

Regnal titles
Preceded by Muhammad Pasha al-Shalik	Wali of Damascus; 1760-1771	Succeeded by Muhammad Pasha al-Azm
