= Kalecik Dam (Osmaniye) =

Coordinates: 37.1477°N 36.4593°E

- Location: Turkey

Kalecik Dam (Osmaniye) is a dam in Osmaniye Province, Turkey. The development was backed by the Turkish State Hydraulic Works.

== See also ==
- List of dams and reservoirs in Turkey
