= Kalecik Dam (Elazığ) =

- Location: Elazığ, Turkey
- Purpose: Irrigation and industrial water
- Status: Operational
- Construction began: 1969
- Opening date: 1974

Dam and spillways
- Type of dam: Earth fill dam
- Height (foundation): 39 m
- Dam volume: 680,000 m³

Reservoir
- Total capacity: 12,000,000 m³
- Surface area: 1 km²

Kalecik Dam is a dam in Elazığ, Turkey. The development was backed by the Turkish State Hydraulic Works. Construction began in 1969 and finished in 1974. It is still in use.

== See also ==
- List of dams and reservoirs in Turkey
