= Bayrak (surname) =

Bayrak is a Turkish language surname which translates to "flag" or "banner" in English. It may refer to:

== People ==
- Esra Bayrak (born 1998), Turkish Paralympian female athlete
- Mithat Bayrak (1929–2014), Turkish sports wrestler and trainer
- Özge Bayrak (born 1992), Turkish female badminton player
- Oksana Bayrak, Ukrainian and Russian TV presenter, film director, producer, actress and screenwriter
- Sedat Bayrak (born 1981), Turkish footballer
- Serdar Bayrak (born 1985), Turkish footballer
- Tosun Bayrak (1926–2018), Turkish writer
- Vitaliy Bayrak (1907–1946), Ukrainian priest and martyr
- Yuliia Bairak, Ukrainian discus thrower at the 2016 IAAF World U20 Championships
