= Sağlam =

Sağlam is a Turkish surname. Notable people with the surname include:

- Ahmet Sağlam (born 1987), Turkish footballer
- Aziz Sağlam (born 1982), Turkish-Belgian futsal player
- Ertuğrul Sağlam (born 1969), Turkish football coach
- Evrim Sağlam (born 1996), Turkish female archer
- Nurullah Sağlam (born 1966), Turkish football coach

== See also ==
- Sağlam, Eğil
