= Kazanlı (disambiguation) =

Kazanlı can refer to:

- Kazanlı
- Kazanlı, Cide
- Kazanlı, Eğil
- Kazanlı, Suluova
