= Irmakköy =

Irmakköy can refer to:

- Irmakköy, Cide
- Irmakköy, İspir
