= Akalan =

Akalan can refer to:

== People ==
- Feride Akalan (born 2001), Turkish female basketball player

== Places ==
- Akalan, Acıpayam
- Akalan, Eğil
