= Olucak =

Olucak can refer to the following places in Turkey:

- Olucak, Cide
- Olucak, Feke
- Olucak, Kızılcahamam
