= Thomas Eisfeld =

German footballer (born 1993)

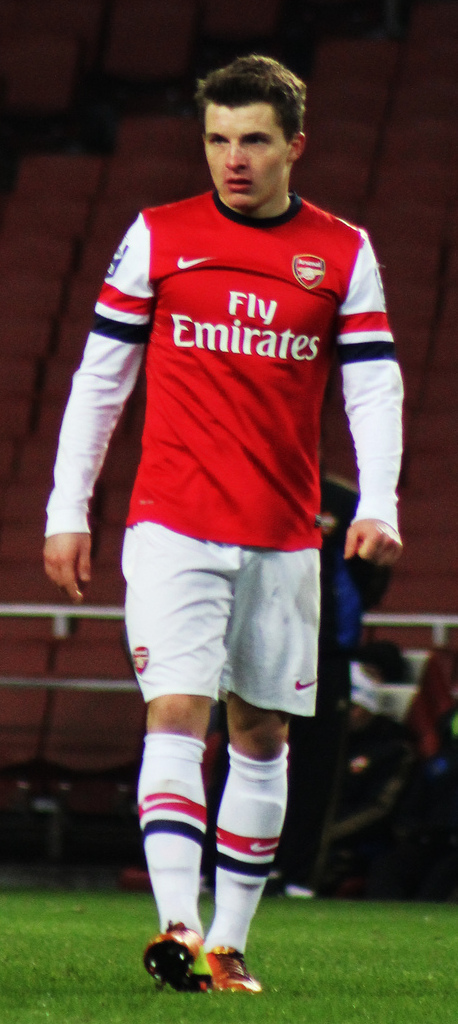
- Eisfeld playing for Arsenal in 2013

Personal information
- Full name: Thomas Eisfeld
- Date of birth: 18 January 1993 (age 33)
- Place of birth: Finsterwalde, Germany
- Height: 1.77 m (5 ft 10 in)
- Position: Attacking midfielder

Youth career
- SV Quitt Ankum
- –2005: VfL Osnabrück
- 2005–2012: Borussia Dortmund

Senior career*
Years	Team	Apps	(Gls)
2012–2014	Arsenal	0	(0)
2014–2015	Fulham	7	(0)
2015	→ VfL Bochum (loan)	12	(1)
2015–2021	VfL Bochum	104	(10)
2022–2025	Rot-Weiss Essen	76	(11)

International career
2014	Germany U20	1	(0)
- * Club domestic league appearances and goals as of 24 May 2025

Thomas Eisfeld (born 18 January 1993) is a German professional footballer who plays as an attacking midfielder.

== Club career ==
Born in Finsterwalde, Germany, Eisfeld began his football career at SV Quitt Ankum and VfL Osnabrück before joining Borussia Dortmund youth academy.

At the beginning of his career at Borussia Dortmund youth academy, Eisfeld first assigned to the Borussia Dortmund U17 and quickly became a regular for the side. He scored 11 goals in 23 appearances, including scoring a brace on three occasions.

After scoring a brace at the start of the 2009–10 season, Eisfeld, however, soon experienced a cruciate ligament injury and was sidelined by the end of the year. After returning from injury, he featured the next four matches, in which he scored three goals. Following this, he was assigned to the Borussia Dortmund U-19 in April 2010.

In the 2010–11 season, with the U19 side, Eisfeld continued to feature for the side until he suffered an injury that kept him out for a long time. After returning from injury, he went on to score seven goals towards the end of the season, including a hat–trick. He scored six goals in twelve matches for the Dortmund U-19 team during the 2011–12 season.

=== Arsenal ===
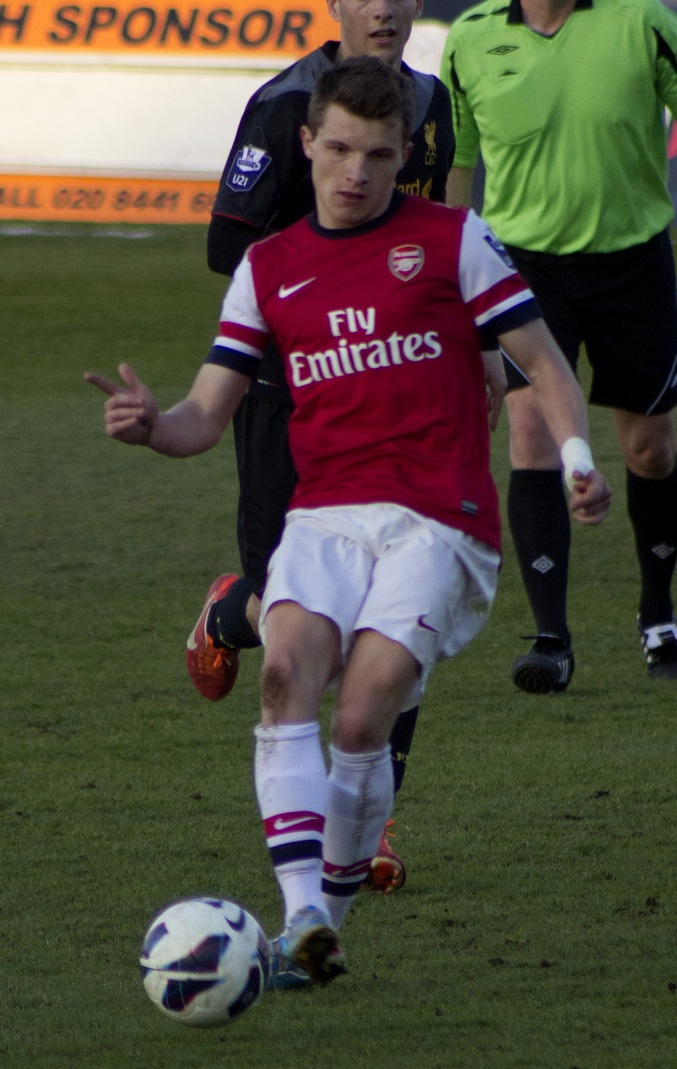
Eisfeld playing for the Arsenal U21 in 2013.

After leaving Dortmund, he was signed by Premier League side Arsenal on 31 January 2012 for a reported fee of £475,000 which was due as compensation for training him as an academy player. Arsène Wenger described Eisfeld as having "the attitude and technical ability to be a valuable addition to our squad." Upon joining the club, Eisfeld was sent to the Arsenal U21 side for the rest of the 2011–12 season and was featured three times.

Eisfeld was later selected for Arsenal's 24 man squad to tour of Asia during July 2012. In a match against a Malaysia XI, Eisfeld replaced Theo Walcott and scored Arsenal's first goal of the game which finished in a 2–1 victory, in Arsenal's favour. Eisfeld made a final appearance on the tour coming on as a substitute, once again, and scoring Arsenal's equalizing goal in a match with Kitchee SC, which ended 2–2. Eisfeld made his professional debut on 30 October in a League Cup game against Reading, coming on as a substitute in the 58th minute. Arsenal won the game 7–5 in extra time, after being 4–0 down during the first half. Although he featured once in the first team, he remained at the U21 side in the 2012–13 season, where he scored the first two goals of the start of the season. After scoring twice on two occasions, Eisfield captained the U21 side for the first time, in a 2–2 draw against Reading U21 on 2 December 2012.

Eisfeld again joined the Arsenal first team as they toured the Far East during the 2013–14 pre-season, donning the number 34 shirt. He scored in the team's first game against the Indonesian Dream Team. Eisfeld started in the Football League Cup tie against West Bromwich Albion, scoring the opening goal for the Gunners and his first for the Arsenal first team. Arsenal went on to win the game on penalties (4-3). His performance in this game prompted Wenger to compare him to former Arsenal midfielder Robert Pires. Although he featured once again in the first team, he scored twice in the first game of the season for the U21 side, in a 2–2 draw against Stoke City U21 on 19 August 2013.

=== Fulham ===
On 23 July 2014, Eisfield completed a permanent transfer across London to Fulham on a two-year contract, with an option of a further 12 months at the club. At the time of his departure, he made two first team appearances at Arsenal.

Eisfeld made his Fulham debut, where he came on as second–half substitute for Chris David, in a 2–1 loss against Ipswich Town in the opening game of the season. In a follow-up match against Millwall, he made his first start for the side, playing 61 minutes before coming off, in a 1–0 loss. However, after the departure of Felix Magath, Eisfeld's first team opportunities became increasingly limited. As a result, he was sent to the reserve side until his departure from Fulham.

=== VfL Bochum ===
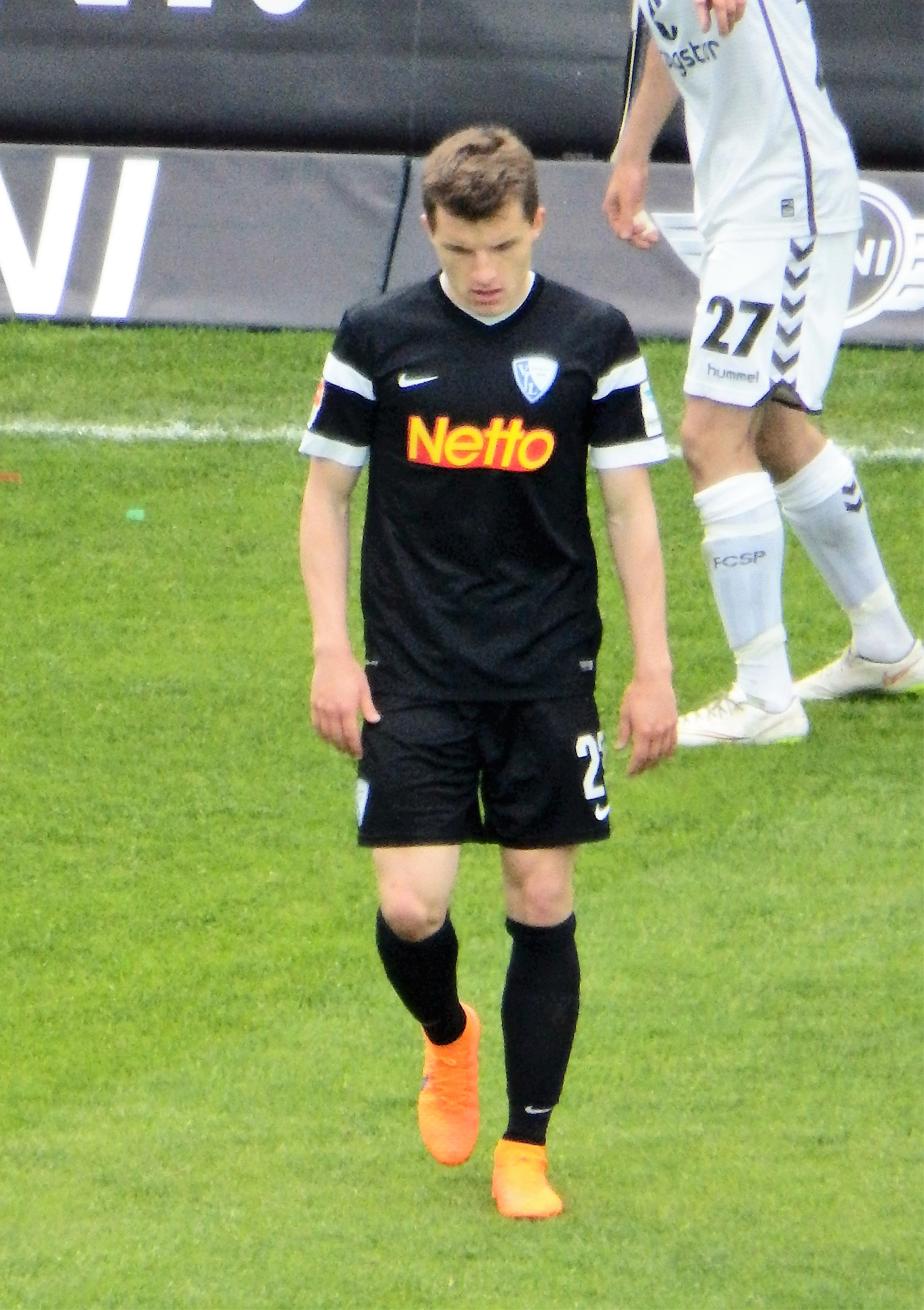
Eisfeld playing for VfL Bochum

Eisfeld moved to VfL Bochum on loan until the end of the 2014–15 season on 2 February 2015, returning to Germany for the first time since 2012. Upon joining the club, he was given a number 23 shirt.

He made his VfL Bochum debut, where he came on as a substitute for Piotr Ćwielong, in a 2–1 loss against Union Berlin on 7 February 2015. In a follow-up match on 13 February 2015, he made his first start, in a 3–2 win over Eintracht Braunschweig. Several weeks later, on 27 February 2015, Eisfeld scored his first goal for the club, as well as, setting up one of the two goals, but was also sent–off in a 3–3 draw against FSV Frankfurt. Despite being out of the first team on two occasions towards the end of the 2014–15 season, Eisfeld went on to make 12 appearances and scored once whilst at Bochum.

At the start of 2015–2016 season, Eisfeld's move to Bochum was made permanent, signing a three–year contract. Eisfeld's first game after signing for the club on a permanent basis came on 18 September 2015, coming on as a late second–half substitute, in a 1–1 draw against Fortuna Düsseldorf. After a string of prior appearances as a substitute from the bench, Eisfeld firmly established himself starting for the first team. It wasn't until on 27 February 2016 when he scored his first goal of the season, in a 3–2 win over SV Sandhausen, followed up scoring in a 3–1 win over Fortuna Düsseldorf. Despite missing one game towards the end of the 2015–16 season, Eisfeld helped the side finish fifth place in the league, as he made 29 appearances and scoring 3 times in all competitions.

In the 2016–17 season, Eisfeld continued to establish himself in the first start for the side. He then scored his first goal of the season, as well as, setting up one of the goals, in a 4–2 win over Erzgebirge Aue. However, he suffered a knee injury that kept him out for five months despite initially out between six and seven weeks. After returning to training from injury in late–March, he made his first appearance since returning from injury against 1. FC Heidenheim on 6 April 2017. Since returning to the first team, Eisfeld went to score two more goals, as VfL Bochum went on to finish ninth place in the league. At the end of the 2016–17 season, Eisfeld finished the season, making 18 appearances in all competitions.

In the 2017–18 season, Eisfeld appeared in the first four matches of the season before suffering a back injury that kept him out at the start of September. However, he was soon sidelined for most of the season, due to injuries and facing competitions. In a 2–1 win over Fortuna Düsseldorf on 6 April 2018, he came on as a substitute in the 66th minute for Robert Tesche and scored four minutes later before being sent–off for a second bookable offence for an altercation with Kaan Ayhan, who was also sent–off for the same offence. In May, he agreed a contract extension until 2021 with Bochum.

=== Rot-Weiss Essen ===
On 24 January 2022, Eisfeld joined Regionalliga West club Rot-Weiss Essen.

== International career ==
Eisfeld represented Germany U20, where he made one appearance against Switzerland U20 on 4 March 2014, in which Germany U20 won 3–2.

== Career statistics ==
As of 23 May 2021

Appearances and goals by club, season and competition
Club	Season	League			National cup		League cup		Other		Total	
Club	Season	Division	Apps	Goals	Apps	Goals	Apps	Goals	Apps	Goals	Apps	Goals
Arsenal	2012–13	Premier League	0	0	0	0	1	0	0	0	1	0
Arsenal	2013–14	Premier League	0	0	0	0	1	1	0	0	1	1
Arsenal	Total		0	0	0	0	2	1	0	0	2	1
Fulham	2014–15	Championship	7	0	0	0	2	0	—		9	0
Bochum	2014–15	2. Bundesliga	12	1	0	0	—		—		12	1
Bochum	2015–16	2. Bundesliga	26	3	3	0	—		—		29	3
Bochum	2016–17	2. Bundesliga	17	3	1	0	—		—		18	3
Bochum	2017–18	2. Bundesliga	18	1	1	0	—		—		19	1
Bochum	2018–19	2. Bundesliga	10	0	0	0	—		—		10	0
Bochum	2019–20	2. Bundesliga	11	1	1	0	—		—		12	1
Bochum	2020–21	2. Bundesliga	22	2	2	0	—		—		24	2
Bochum	Total		116	11	8	0	0	0	0	0	124	11
Career total			123	11	8	0	4	1	0	0	135	12
