= Kethüda (disambiguation) =

Kethüda was an Ottoman professional title

Kethüda may also refer to:

- Kethüda, Cide, a village in the Cide District of Kastamonu Province, Turkey
- Havvanur Kethüda (born 2007), Turkish female boxer
