= Dağlı Kuylucu Cave =

Pit cave in Turkey

- Dağlı Kuylucu Mağarası; Kuyluç Mağarası
- Location within Turkey
- Location: Dağlı, Cide, Kastamonu, Turkey
- Coordinates: 41.80829°N 33.09996°E
- Depth: 279 m (915 ft)
- Length: 445 m (1,460 ft)

Dağlı Kuylucu Cave or Kuyluç Cave (Turkish: Dağlı Kuylucu Mağarası or Kuyluç Mağarası) is a pit cave located in Kastamonu Province, Turkey.

Dağlı Kuylucu Cave is situated at Dağlı village in Cide district of Kastamonu Province, northern Turkey. The vertical cave is 279 m (915 ft) deep and has a length of 445 m (1,460 ft). The cave was discovered in the early 1990s, and was explored by Boğaziçi University Cave Exploration Club in 1993.
