= Kumköy =

Kumköy can refer to the following villages in Turkey:

- Kumköy, Cide
- Kumköy, Eceabat
- Kumköy, Serik
- Kilyos, Sarıyer, also known as Kumköy
