= Oyalı =

Oyalı can refer to:

- Oyalı (sheep)
- Oyalı, Besni
- Oyalı, Eğil
