= 2015–16 VfL Bochum season =

VfL Bochum
2015–16 season
- Chairman: Hans-Peter Villis
- Manager: Gertjan Verbeek
- Stadium: rewirpowerSTADION
- 2. Bundesliga: 5th
- DFB-Pokal: Quarterfinals
- Top goalscorer: League: Terodde (25); All: Terodde (28)
- Highest home attendance: 27,561 (vs Fortuna Düsseldorf, 18 September 2015)
- Lowest home attendance: 11,479 (vs SC Paderborn 07, 11 December 2015)
- Average home league attendance: 17,994
Home colours	Away colours	Third colours

The 2015–16 VfL Bochum season was the 78th season in club history.

== Review and events ==
Simon Terodde set a new record for the number of 2. Bundesliga goals for the club. After Terodde tied Peter Peschel's old record of 28 goals on 27 February 2016 against SV Sandhausen, he broke it on 1 March 2016 with his goal against Fortuna Düsseldorf.

== Matches ==
=== Legend ===
Win Draw Loss

=== Friendly matches ===
20 June 2015 Friendly	Hattingen-Selection	0–6	VfL Bochum	Hattingen
18:30			Terodde 11'; Fabian 39'; Gulden 59'; Rafael 65', 84'; Maria 77'	Stadium: TuS-Platzanlage; Attendance: 1,500; Referee: Dennis Melsa (Gevelsberg)

24 June 2015 Friendly	SV Blau-Weiß Weitmar 09	0–18	VfL Bochum	Bochum
18:30			Bulut 6', 14'; Terodde 8', 17', 26'; Haberer 24', 40'; Terrazzino 30'; Gregoritsch 32'; Bastians 38'; Sağlam 51', 58'; Rafael 53', 75'; Ćwielong 67'; Maria 71', 90'; Gulden 86'	Stadium: Erbstollen Arena; Attendance: 3,000; Referee: Holger Danielsiek

27 June 2015 Friendly	TSG Dülmen	0–11	VfL Bochum	Dülmen
18:30			Losilla 10'; Maria 12', 45'; Terodde 13', 29'; Haberer 35'; Rafael 47', 60', 73'; Gül 54'; Ćwielong 67'	Stadium: TSG Stadion

1 July 2015 Friendly	SC Preußen Münster	2–2	VfL Bochum	Billerbeck
19:00	A. Sağlam 48'; Piossek 51'		Terodde 36'; Rafael 74'	Stadium: Sportzentrum Helker Berg; Referee: Sören Storks (Velen)

4 July 2015 Friendly	VfL Bochum	3–1	Waasland-Beveren	Herne
16:00	Terodde 15'; Terrazzino 18'; Pavlidis 57'		Sawaneh 85'	Stadium: ABISOL-ARENA; Referee: Benjamin Bläser (Niederzier)

8 July 2015 Friendly	P.A.O.K.	3–4	VfL Bochum	Arnhem
16:30	Pereyra 8', 11'; Kitsiou 45'		Costa 10' (o.g.); Hoogland 32'; Vítor 42' (o.g.); Gregoritsch 65'	Stadium: Sportpark Schuytgraaf

11 July 2015 Friendly	MSV Duisburg	1–2	VfL Bochum	Duisburg
18:30	Janjić 70' (pen.)		Haberer 22'; Gregoritsch 37'	Stadium: Schauinsland-Reisen-Arena; Referee: Guido Winkmann (Kerken)

14 July 2015 Friendly	Rot-Weiß Oberhausen	0–2	VfL Bochum	Oberhausen
19:00			Terodde 30'; Bulut 71'	Stadium: Niederrheinstadion; Attendance: 816; Referee: Sven Waschitzki (Essen)

15 July 2015 Friendly	Heracles Almelo	1–1	VfL Bochum	Billerbeck
17:00	Tannane 45' (pen.)		Rafael 90'	Stadium: Sportzentrum Helker Berg; Attendance: 0 Referee: Benjamin Börner

17 July 2015 Friendly	VfL Bochum	2–1	Borussia Dortmund	Bochum
20:00	Terrazzino 33'; Hoogland 59'		Dusziak 80'	Stadium: rewirpowerSTADION; Attendance: 28,000; Referee: Sören Storks (Velen)

21 July 2015 Friendly	Sparta Rotterdam	3–2	VfL Bochum	Rosendahl
17:00	Brogno 14' van Moorsel 25'; Dogan 84'		Pavlidis 46'; Ćwielong 79' (pen.)	Stadium: Turo-Stadion; Attendance: 0

27 July 2015 Friendly	VfL Bochum	3–0	Sportfreunde Baumberg	Bochum
18:00	Rafael 52', 68'; Sağlam 65'			Stadium: Leichtathletik-Platz am rewirpowerSTADION; Referee: Florian Exner (Beelen)

2 August 2015 Friendly	VfL Bochum	6–0	SG Wattenscheid 09	Bochum
11:00	Rafael 17', 39', 67', 68'; Ćwielong 52'; Kader 71'			Stadium: Leichtathletik-Platz am rewirpowerSTADION

16 August 2015 Friendly	VfL Bochum	6–0	TSV Marl-Hüls	Bochum
11:00	Mlapa 2'; Wijnaldum 17'; Rafael 22'; Ćwielong 63', 90'; Cacutalua 85'			Stadium: Leichtathletik-Platz am rewirpowerSTADION; Attendance: 100

24 August 2015 Friendly	SC Westfalia Herne	0–3	VfL Bochum	Herne
18:00			Sağlam 72'; Šimůnek 75'; Ćwielong 82'	Stadium: ABISOL-ARENA

3 September 2015 Friendly	Concordia Wiemelhausen	0–4	VfL Bochum	Bochum
18:30			Gül 53'; Haberer 70', 90'; Bulut 77'	Stadium: Erbstollen Arena; Attendance: 1,500; Referee: Jens Jeromin (Bochum)

12 September 2015 Friendly	VfL Bochum	1–0	Sportfreunde Lotte	Bochum
12:00	Šimůnek 26'			Stadium: Leichtathletik-Platz am rewirpowerSTADION

26 September 2015 Friendly	VfL Bochum	6–0	Achilles '29	Bochum
11:00	Rafael 4', 39'; Maria 34'; Novikovas 54'; Pavlidis 80'; Ćwielong 86'			Stadium: Leichtathletik-Platz am rewirpowerSTADION; Attendance: 150; Referee: Sven Waschitzki (Essen)

8 October 2015 Friendly	1. FC Köln	0–3	VfL Bochum	Cologne
15:00			Ćwielong 44' (pen.); Rafael 70'; Gündüz 77'	Stadium: Franz-Kremer-Stadion; Attendance: 0 Referee: Sascha Stegemann (Niederkassel)

19 October 2015 Friendly	VfL Bochum	7–0	KFC Uerdingen 05	Bochum
12:00	Weis 23'; Eisfeld 39', 77', 81'; Kader 60'; Ćwielong 68', 90'			Stadium: Leichtathletik-Platz am rewirpowerSTADION; Referee: Markus Wollenweber (Mönchengladbach)

7 November 2015 Friendly	VfL Bochum	4–1	1. FC Köln II	Bochum
12:00	Novikovas 56'; Gül 57'; Ćwielong 62'; Pavlidis 79'		Bors 31' (pen.)	Stadium: Leichtathletik-Platz am rewirpowerSTADION; Attendance: 100; Referee: Florian Exner (Beelen)

12 November 2015 Friendly	SC Preußen Münster	0–0	VfL Bochum	Münster
15:00				Stadium: Preußenstadion; Attendance: 421; Referee: Sören Storks (Velen)

21 November 2015 Friendly	VfL Bochum	2–1	Alemannia Aachen	Bochum
12:00	Eisfeld 60'; Rafael 67' (pen.)		Ito 29'	Stadium: Leichtathletik-Platz am rewirpowerSTADION; Attendance: 0 Referee: Bastian Börner (Dortmund)

28 November 2015 Friendly	VfL Bochum	2–1	Borussia Mönchengladbach II	Bochum
11:00	Maria 41'; Eisfeld 85'		Ndenge 2'	Stadium: Leichtathletik-Platz am rewirpowerSTADION; Referee: Sven Waschitzki (Essen)

10 January 2016 Friendly	VfL Bochum	0–0	VfB Stuttgart	Belek
15:30				Stadium: Platzanlage des Riu Kaya Palazzo

13 January 2016 Friendly	VfL Bochum	4–1	Hertha BSC	Belek
19:00	Mlapa 49', 75'; Sağlam 58'; Novikovas 60'		Baumjohann 6'	Stadium: Gloria-Arena

16 January 2016 Friendly	VfL Bochum	5–2	Borussia Mönchengladbach	Bochum
16:00	Haberer 25'; Terodde 56', 64', 70'; Eisfeld 82'		Traoré 19'; Stindl 41'	Stadium: rewirpowerSTADION; Attendance: 5,677; Referee: Sven Waschitzki (Essen)

19 January 2016 Friendly	Bayer 04 Leverkusen	1–2	VfL Bochum	Leverkusen
15:00	Mehmedi 54'		Losilla 15'; Novikovas 89'	Stadium: Ulrich-Haberland-Stadion; Attendance: 825; Referee: Sascha Stegemann (Niederkassel)

23 January 2016 Friendly	VfL Bochum	1–2	FC Schalke 04 II	Bochum
13:00	Eisfeld 82'		Platte 70'; Öztürk 74'	Stadium: Leichtathletik-Platz am rewirpowerSTADION; Attendance: 0

24 March 2016 Friendly	Fortuna Düsseldorf	3–0	VfL Bochum	Düsseldorf
16:00	Demirbay 7'; Bebou 20'; Kinjo 90'			Stadium: Bezirkssportanlage Garath; Referee: Benjamin Bläser (Niederzier)

3 April 2016 Friendly	VfL Bochum	5–3	FC Kray	Bochum
11:00	Hoogland 5'; Novikovas 13', 74'; Ćwielong 48'; Mlapa 87'		Grumann 45'; Ilbay 70'; Šimůnek 82' (o.g.)	Stadium: Leichtathletik-Platz am rewirpowerSTADION; Referee: Sven Waschitzki (Essen)

17 April 2016 Friendly	Borussia Mönchengladbach II	6–3	VfL Bochum	Mönchengladbach
11:00	Hrgota 6', 51'; Hofmann 11'; Herrmann 19', 90'; Hahn 28'		Ćwielong 8', 60' (pen.); Rafael 39'	Stadium: Borussia-Park; Referee: Markus Wollenweber (Mönchengladbach)

=== 2. Bundesliga ===
==== League table ====
Pos	Team	Pld	W	D	L	GF	GA	GD	Pts	Promotion, qualification or relegation
3	1. FC Nürnberg	34	19	8	7	68	41	+27	65	Qualification for promotion play-offs
4	FC St. Pauli	34	15	8	11	45	39	+6	53	
5	VfL Bochum	34	13	12	9	56	40	+16	51	
6	Union Berlin	34	13	10	11	56	50	+6	49	
7	Karlsruher SC	34	12	11	11	35	37	−2	47	

Source: DFB
Rules for classification: 1) Points; 2) Goal difference; 3) Goals scored

==== Results summary ====
Overall								Home						Away					
Pld	W	D	L	GF	GA	GD	Pts	W	D	L	GF	GA	GD	W	D	L	GF	GA	GD
34	13	12	9	56	40	+16	51	7	7	3	31	19	+12	6	5	6	25	21	+4

==== Results by round ====
Round	1	2	3	4	5	6	7	8	9	10	11	12	13	14	15	16	17	18	19	20	21	22	23	24	25	26	27	28	29	30	31	32	33	34
Ground	A	H	A	H	H	A	H	A	W	A	H	A	H	A	H	A	H	H	A	H	A	A	H	A	H	A	H	A	H	A	W	A	H	A
Result	W	W	W	W	W	D	D	D	L	W	L	L	D	L	D	L	D	W	D	W	D	D	W	W	D	W	D	L	W	L	D	L	L	W
Position	3	2	1	1	1	1	1	1	2	1	2	4	4	6	6	8	8	6	6	5	5	5	5	5	5	4	5	5	4	5	5	5	5	5

A = Away; H = Home; W = Win; D = Draw; L = Loss

==== Matches ====
26 July 2015 1	SC Paderborn 07	0–1	VfL Bochum	Paderborn
13:30			Haberer 61'	Stadium: Benteler Arena; Attendance: 13,073; Referee: Marco Fritz (Korb)

1 August 2015 2	VfL Bochum	3–0	MSV Duisburg	Bochum
13:00	Perthel 56'; Bulut 68'; Terodde 84'			Stadium: rewirpowerSTADION; Attendance: 23,542; Referee: Florian Meyer (Burgdorf)

15 August 2015 3	SC Freiburg	1–3	VfL Bochum	Freiburg
13:00	Torrejón 82'		Bulut 65'; Terodde 70', 75'	Stadium: Schwarzwald-Stadion; Attendance: 23,500; Referee: Peter Sippel (Munich)

23 August 2015 4	VfL Bochum	2–1	1. FC Nürnberg	Bochum
13:30	Terodde 37'; Haberer 64'		Burgstaller 2'	Stadium: rewirpowerSTADION; Attendance: 21,131; Referee: Tobias Welz (Wiesbaden)

31 August 2015 5	VfL Bochum	1–0	TSV 1860 Munich	Bochum
20:15	Terodde 48'			Stadium: rewirpowerSTADION; Attendance: 20,776; Referee: Frank Willenborg (Osnabrück)

11 September 2015 6	SV Sandhausen	1–1	VfL Bochum	Sandhausen
18:30	Wooten 43' (pen.)		Bastians 4' (pen.)	Stadium: Hardtwaldstadion; Attendance: 5,495; Referee: Wolfgang Stark (Ergolding)

18 September 2015 7	VfL Bochum	1–1	Fortuna Düsseldorf	Bochum
18:30	Hoogland 26'		van Duinen 90+2'	Stadium: rewirpowerSTADION; Attendance: 27,561; Referee: Sascha Stegemann (Niederkassel)

22 September 2015 8	Arminia Bielefeld	1–1	VfL Bochum	Bielefeld
17:30	Klos 81'		Terodde 28' (pen.)	Stadium: Alm; Attendance: 16,720; Referee: Robert Hartmann (Wangen)

25 September 2015 9	VfL Bochum	1–2	1. FC Kaiserslautern	Bochum
18:30	Mlapa 73'		Čolak 25'; Piossek 29'	Stadium: rewirpowerSTADION; Attendance: 21,164; Referee: Tobias Stieler (Hamburg)

3 October 2015 10	SpVgg Greuther Fürth	0–5	VfL Bochum	Fürth
13:00			Terodde 2', 54'; Terrazzino 24'; Röcker 31' (o.g.); Mlapa 90'	Stadium: Stadion am Laubenweg; Attendance: 11,745; Referee: Daniel Siebert (Berlin)

18 October 2015 11	VfL Bochum	0–1	RB Leipzig	Bochum
13:30			Sabitzer 65'	Stadium: rewirpowerSTADION; Attendance: 20,704; Referee: Benjamin Brand (Bamberg)

23 October 2015 12	FSV Frankfurt	3–2	VfL Bochum	Frankfurt am Main
18:30	Dedić 68'; Ballas 71'; Kapllani 86'		Terodde 15'; Hoogland 23'	Stadium: Frankfurter Volksbank Stadion; Attendance: 5,341; Referee: Robert Kempter (Sauldorf)

30 October 2015 13	VfL Bochum	1–1	FC St. Pauli	Bochum
18:30	Terodde 12'		Kalla 10'	Stadium: rewirpowerSTADION; Attendance: 25,914; Referee: Felix Zwayer (Berlin)

6 November 2015 14	Karlsruher SC	3–0	VfL Bochum	Karlsruhe
18:30	Diamantakos 33'; Yamada 47'; Barry 77'			Stadium: Wildparkstadion; Attendance: 15,600; Referee: Peter Sippel (Munich)

20 November 2015 15	VfL Bochum	1–1	1. FC Union Berlin	Bochum
18:30	Mlapa 13'		Kreilach 37'	Stadium: rewirpowerSTADION; Attendance: 13,590; Referee: Benjamin Cortus (Röthenbach)

27 November 2015 16	Eintracht Braunschweig	1–0	VfL Bochum	Braunschweig
18:30	Khelifi 41'			Stadium: Eintracht-Stadion; Attendance: 21,030; Referee: Guido Winkmann (Kerken)

6 December 2015 17	VfL Bochum	1–1	1. FC Heidenheim	Bochum
13:30	Bulut 46'		Schnatterer 32'	Stadium: rewirpowerSTADION; Attendance: 12,774; Referee: Michael Weiner (Giesen)

11 December 2015 18	VfL Bochum	4–0	SC Paderborn 07	Bochum
18:30	Mlapa 8', 10'; Hoogland 31'; Bastians 90+2'			Stadium: rewirpowerSTADION; Attendance: 11,479; Referee: Christian Dietz (Kronach)

20 December 2015 19	MSV Duisburg	0–0	VfL Bochum	Duisburg
13:30				Stadium: Schauinsland-Reisen-Arena; Attendance: 22,351; Referee: Robert Hartmann (Wangen)

5 February 2016 20	VfL Bochum	2–0	SC Freiburg	Bochum
18:30	Terrazzino 13'; Hoogland 67'			Stadium: rewirpowerSTADION; Attendance: 18,245; Referee: Robert Kampka (Mainz)

15 February 2016 21	1. FC Nürnberg	1–1	VfL Bochum	Nuremberg
20:15	Erras 75'		Terrazzino 66'	Stadium: Frankenstadion; Attendance: 24,355; Referee: Daniel Siebert (Berlin)

21 February 2016 22	TSV 1860 Munich	1–1	VfL Bochum	Munich
13:30	Okotie 36'		Terrazzino 44'	Stadium: Allianz Arena; Attendance: 15,300; Referee: Markus Schmidt (Stuttgart)

27 February 2016 23	VfL Bochum	3–2	SV Sandhausen	Bochum
13:00	Eisfeld 10'; Terodde 21', 78' (pen.)		Stolz 64'; Bouhaddouz 72'	Stadium: rewirpowerSTADION; Attendance: 12,209; Referee: Guido Winkmann (Kerken)

1 March 2016 24	Fortuna Düsseldorf	1–3	VfL Bochum	Düsseldorf
17:30	Sararer 19'		Terodde 63'; Eisfeld 67'; Haberer 73'	Stadium: Esprit Arena; Attendance: 24,000; Referee: Benjamin Cortus (Röthenbach)

6 March 2016 25	VfL Bochum	2–2	Arminia Bielefeld	Bochum
13:30	Terodde 30', 90+6'		Ulm 48' (pen.); Nöthe 79'	Stadium: rewirpowerSTADION; Attendance: 17,699; Referee: Tobias Welz (Wiesbaden)

14 March 2016 26	1. FC Kaiserslautern	0–2	VfL Bochum	Kaiserslautern
20:15			Terodde 48' (pen.), 90'	Stadium: Fritz-Walter-Stadion; Attendance: 19,342; Referee: Patrick Ittrich (Hamburg)

20 March 2016 27	VfL Bochum	2–2	SpVgg Greuther Fürth	Bochum
13:30	Terodde 43'; Rafael 90+1'		Gießelmann 12'; Berisha 66'	Stadium: rewirpowerSTADION; Attendance: 13,443; Referee: Robert Schröder (Hannover)

2 April 2016 28	RB Leipzig	3–1	VfL Bochum	Leipzig
13:00	Kaiser 51'; Bruno 53', 63'		Losilla 88'	Stadium: Zentralstadion; Attendance: 32,244; Referee: Benjamin Brand (Bamberg)

9 April 2016 29	VfL Bochum	4–1	FSV Frankfurt	Bochum
13:00	Bulut 24'; Terodde 37'; Eisfeld 49'; Fabian 88'		Schahin 3'	Stadium: rewirpowerSTADION; Attendance: 13,300; Referee: Knut Kircher (Rottenburg)

16 April 2016 30	FC St. Pauli	2–0	VfL Bochum	Hamburg
13:00	Picault 52', 65'			Stadium: Millerntor-Stadion; Attendance: 29,563; Referee: Florian Meyer (Burgdorf)

22 April 2016 31	VfL Bochum	1–1	Karlsruher SC	Bochum
18:30	Terodde 58'		Nazarov 87' (pen.)	Stadium: rewirpowerSTADION; Attendance: 14,463; Referee: Sven Jablonski (Bremen)

29 April 2016 32	1. FC Union Berlin	1–0	VfL Bochum	Berlin
18:30	Kessel 80'			Stadium: Stadion An der Alten Försterei; Attendance: 19,000; Referee: Martin Petersen (Stuttgart)

8 May 2016 33	VfL Bochum	2–3	Eintracht Braunschweig	Bochum
15:30	Terodde 27', 34'		Holtmann 8'; Bastians 56' (o.g.); Ademi 62'	Stadium: rewirpowerSTADION; Attendance: 17,899; Referee: Robert Kempter (Sauldorf)

15 May 2016 34	1. FC Heidenheim	2–4	VfL Bochum	Heidenheim an der Brenz
15:30	Morabit 78', 90+1'		Terodde 1', 59', 67' (pen.); Terrazzino 56'	Stadium: Voith-Arena; Attendance: 13,500; Referee: Patrick Alt (Heusweiler)

=== DFB-Pokal ===
9 August 2015 R1	FSV Salmrohr	0–5	VfL Bochum	Salmtal
14:30			Terodde 40', 49', 59'; Terrazzino 64', 90+1'	Stadium: Salmtalstadion; Attendance: 4,500; Referee: Patrick Schult (Hamburg)

27 October 2015 R2	VfL Bochum	1–0	1. FC Kaiserslautern	Bochum
20:30	Löwe 67' (o.g.)			Stadium: rewirpowerSTADION; Attendance: 18,514; Referee: Günter Perl (Pullach)

16 December 2015 R3	TSV 1860 Munich	0–2	VfL Bochum	Munich
20:30			Haberer 39'; Hoogland 44'	Stadium: Allianz Arena; Attendance: 19,800; Referee: Marco Fritz (Korb)

10 February 2016 QF	VfL Bochum	0–3	FC Bayern Munich	Bochum
20:30			Lewandowski 39', 90'; Thiago 61'	Stadium: rewirpowerSTADION; Attendance: 28,000; Referee: Bastian Dankert (Rostock)

== Squad ==
=== Squad and statistics ===
==== Squad, appearances and goals scored ====
As of 15 May 2016

No.	Pos	Nat	Player	Total		2. Bundesliga		DFB-Pokal	
No.	Pos	Nat	Player	Apps	Goals	Apps	Goals	Apps	Goals
1	GK	(Germany) GER	Andreas Luthe	16	0	16	0	0	0
2	MF	(Germany) GER	Tim Hoogland	37	5	33	4	4	1
3	DF	(Netherlands) NED	Giliano Wijnaldum	9	0	7	0	2	0
4	DF	(Germany) GER	Malcolm Cacutalua	12	0	11	0	1	0
5	DF	(Germany) GER	Felix Bastians	35	2	31	2	4	0
6	DF	(Czech Republic) CZE	Jan Šimůnek	8	0	6	0	2	0
7	MF	(Germany) GER	Selim Gündüz	0	0	0	0	0	0
8	MF	(France) FRA	Anthony Losilla	36	1	32	1	4	0
9	FW	(Angola) ANG	Nando Rafael	8	1	8	1	0	0
10	MF	(Germany) GER	Marco Terrazzino	34	7	31	5	3	2
11	FW	(Austria) AUT	Michael Gregoritsch (until 24 July 2015)	0	0	0	0	0	0
11	MF	(Lithuania) LTU	Arvydas Novikovas (since 24 July 2015)	15	0	15	0	0	0
13	MF	(Germany) GER	Thomas Eisfeld (since 21 August 2015)	29	3	26	3	3	0
14	FW	(Germany) GER	Peniel Mlapa (since 7 August 2015)	31	5	28	5	3	0
15	FW	(Germany) GER	Cagatay Kader	0	0	0	0	0	0
16	DF	(Germany) GER	Gökhan Gül	0	0	0	0	0	0
17	MF	(Germany) GER	Tobias Weis	6	0	4	0	2	0
18	DF	(Germany) GER	Jan Gyamerah	0	0	0	0	0	0
19	DF	(Germany) GER	Patrick Fabian (captain)	33	1	29	1	4	0
20	MF	(Poland) POL	Piotr Ćwielong	3	0	3	0	0	0
21	DF	(Germany) GER	Stefano Celozzi	38	0	34	0	4	0
22	FW	(Germany) GER	Simon Terodde	37	28	33	25	4	3
23	FW	(Germany) GER	Janik Haberer	37	4	33	3	4	1
24	DF	(Germany) GER	Timo Perthel	29	1	25	1	4	0
25	MF	(Turkey) TUR	Onur Bulut	35	4	31	4	4	0
26	MF	(Germany) GER	Görkem Sağlam	1	0	1	0	0	0
27	MF	(Curaçao) CUW	Michaël Maria	9	0	9	0	0	0
28	DF	(Germany) GER	Frederik Lach	0	0	0	0	0	0
29	MF	(Germany) GER	Julian Stock (until 3 September 2015)	0	0	0	0	0	0
30	DF	(Poland) POL	David Niepsuj	0	0	0	0	0	0
31	MF	(Germany) GER	Tom Baack	0	0	0	0	0	0
32	GK	(Germany) GER	Felix Dornebusch	0	0	0	0	0	0
33	GK	(Germany) GER	Manuel Riemann	22	0	18	0	4	0
34	FW	(Greece) GRE	Vangelis Pavlidis	1	0	1	0	0	0
35	MF	(Germany) GER	Roman Zengin	0	0	0	0	0	0
39	MF	(Norway) NOR	Henrik Gulden (until 1 February 2016, between 19 August 2015 and 31 December 2015 on loan at Mjøndalen IF)	0	0	0	0	0	0

=== Transfers ===
As of 2 February 2016

==== Summer ====
In:

No.	Pos.	Nation	Player
2	MF	GER	Tim Hoogland (from (England) Fulham F.C.)
3	DF	NED	Giliano Wijnaldum (from (Netherlands) Go Ahead Eagles)
9	FW	ANG	Nando Rafael (Free agent)
11	FW	AUT	Michael Gregoritsch (from TSG 1899 Hoffenheim, previously on loan)
11	FW	LTU	Arvydas Novikovas (from FC Erzgebirge Aue)
13	MF	GER	Thomas Eisfeld (from (England) Fulham F.C., previously on loan)
14	FW	GER	Peniel Mlapa (from Borussia Mönchengladbach, previously on at 1. FC Nürnberg)
15	FW	GER	Cagatay Kader (from VfL Bochum U-19)
17	MF	GER	Tobias Weis (from TSG 1899 Hoffenheim, previously on loan)
23	FW	GER	Janik Haberer (on loan from TSG 1899 Hoffenheim)
28	DF	GER	Frederik Lach (from VfL Bochum U-19)
30	DF	POL	David Niepsuj (from VfL Bochum II)
31	MF	GER	Tom Baack (from VfL Bochum U-17)
33	GK	GER	Manuel Riemann (from SV Sandhausen)
34	MF	GRE	Vangelis Pavlidis (from VfL Bochum U-17)
35	MF	GER	Roman Zengin (from VfL Bochum U-19)

Out:

No.	Pos.	Nation	Player
3	DF	GER	Fabian Holthaus (to Fortuna Düsseldorf)
5	DF	GER	Heiko Butscher (retired)
9	FW	SVK	Stanislav Šesták (to (Hungary) Ferencvárosi TC)
10	MF	JPN	Yusuke Tasaka (to (Japan) Kawasaki Frontale)
11	FW	AUT	Michael Gregoritsch (to Hamburger SV)
14	MF	BIH	Adnan Zahirović (to (Israel) Hapoel Acre F.C.)
15	DF	GER	Nicolas Abdat (to VfL Wolfsburg II)
16	MF	TUR	Ridvan Balci (to Schwarz-Weiß Essen)
18	MF	GER	Danny Latza (to 1. FSV Mainz 05)
28	FW	GER	Joel Reinholz (released)
29	MF	GER	Julian Stock (released)
31	GK	GER	Michael Esser (to (Austria) SK Sturm Graz)
33	FW	FIN	Mikael Forssell (released)
35	MF	GER	Gazi Siala (to BSV Schwarz-Weiß Rehden)
37	DF	GER	Erdinc Karakas (to FC Schalke 04 U-19)
38	GK	GER	Marius Weeke (to SC Wiedenbrück)
39	MF	NOR	Henrik Gulden (on loan to (Norway) Mjøndalen IF)
41	FW	RUS	Laurynas Kulikas (to Hamburger SV II)

==== Winter ====
In:

No.	Pos.	Nation	Player

Out:

No.	Pos.	Nation	Player
39	MF	NOR	Henrik Gulden (to Rot-Weiss Essen, previously on loan at (Norway) Mjøndalen IF)
