= Kuşçu =

Kuşçu can refer to the following villages in Turkey:

- Kuşçu, Cide
- Kuşçu, Karakoçan
- Kuşçu, Keban
- Kuşçu, Polatlı
