= Kasımköy, Cide =

Village in Turkey

Kasımköy
- Neighbourhood
- Location in Turkey
- Coordinates: 41.890°N 33.029°E
- Country: Turkey
- Province: Kastamonu
- District: Cide
- Municipality: Cide
- Population (2021): 214
- Time zone: UTC+3 (TRT)

Kasımköy (also: Kasım) is a neighbourhood of the town Cide, Cide District, Kastamonu Province, Turkey. Its population is 214 (2021).
