= Ilgın, Eğil =

Village in Turkey

Ilgın
- Neighbourhood
- Location in Turkey
- Coordinates: 38°16′15″N 40°06′03″E
- Country: Turkey
- Province: Diyarbakır
- District: Eğil
- Population (2022): 477
- Time zone: UTC+3 (TRT)

Ilgın (Kurdish: Qizlan) is a neighbourhood in the municipality and district of Eğil, Diyarbakır Province in Turkey. It is populated by Kurds and had a population of 477 in 2022.
