= Ağaçbükü, Cide =

Village in Turkey

Ağaçbükü
- Village
- Location in Turkey
- Coordinates: 41°54′11″N 33°10′27″E
- Country: Turkey
- Province: Kastamonu
- District: Cide
- Population (2021): 192
- Time zone: UTC+3 (TRT)

Ağaçbükü is a village in the Cide District of Kastamonu Province in Turkey. Its population is 192 (2021).
