= Çilekçe, Cide =

Village in Turkey

Çilekçe
- Village
- Location in Turkey
- Coordinates: 41°55′33″N 33°18′55″E
- Country: Turkey
- Province: Kastamonu
- District: Cide
- Population (2021): 184
- Time zone: UTC+3 (TRT)

Çilekçe is a village in the Cide District of Kastamonu Province in Turkey. Its population is 184 (2021).
