= Sarmaşık, Eğil =

Village in Turkey

Sarmaşık
- Neighbourhood
- Location in Turkey
- Coordinates: 38°16′39″N 40°10′01″E
- Country: Turkey
- Province: Diyarbakır
- District: Eğil
- Population (2022): 943
- Time zone: UTC+3 (TRT)

Sarmaşık (Kurdish: Basirafi) is a neighbourhood in the municipality and district of Eğil, Diyarbakır Province in Turkey. It is populated by Kurds and had a population of 943 in 2022.
