= Konak, Eğil =

Village in Turkey

Konak
- Neighbourhood
- Location in Turkey
- Coordinates: 38°11′08″N 40°08′07″E
- Country: Turkey
- Province: Diyarbakır
- District: Eğil
- Population (2022): 341
- Time zone: UTC+3 (TRT)

Konak (Kurdish: Qunax) is a neighbourhood in the municipality and district of Eğil, Diyarbakır Province in Turkey. It is populated by Kurds and had a population of 341 in 2022.
