= Balaban, Eğil =

Village in Turkey

Balaban
- Neighbourhood
- Location in Turkey
- Coordinates: 38.1728°N 40.2082°E
- Country: Turkey
- Province: Diyarbakır
- District: Eğil
- Population (2022): 1,036
- Time zone: UTC+3 (TRT)

Balaban (Kurdish: Rutan) is a neighbourhood in the municipality and district of Eğil, Diyarbakır Province in Turkey. It is populated by Kurds and had a population of 1,036 in 2022.
