= Baysu, Eğil =

Village in Turkey

Baysu
- Neighbourhood
- Location in Turkey
- Coordinates: 38°09′N 40°06′E
- Country: Turkey
- Province: Diyarbakır
- District: Eğil
- Population (2022): 900
- Time zone: UTC+3 (TRT)

Baysu (Kurdish: Kurkuwan) is a neighbourhood in the municipality and district of Eğil, Diyarbakır Province in Turkey. It is populated by Kurds and had a population of 900 in 2022.
