= Babalar, Eğil =

Village in Turkey

Babalar
- Neighbourhood
- Location within Turkey
- Coordinates: 38.2124°N 40.2355°E
- Country: Turkey
- Province: Diyarbakır
- District: Eğil
- Population (2022): 321
- Time zone: UTC+3 (TRT)

Babalar (Kurdish: Bubekir) is a neighbourhood in the municipality and district of Eğil, Diyarbakır Province in Turkey. Its population was 321 in 2022.
