= Köseli, Cide =

Village in Turkey

Köseli
- Village
- Location in Turkey
- Coordinates: 41.913°N 33.018°E
- Country: Turkey
- Province: Kastamonu
- District: Cide
- Population (2021): 81
- Time zone: UTC+3 (TRT)

Köseli is a village in the Cide District of Kastamonu Province in Turkey. Its population is 81 (2021).
