= Çamaltı, Cide =

Village in Turkey

Çamaltı
- Village
- Location in Turkey
- Coordinates: 41.940°N 33.145°E
- Country: Turkey
- Province: Kastamonu
- District: Cide
- Population (2021): 174
- Time zone: UTC+3 (TRT)

Çamaltı is a village in the Cide District of Kastamonu Province in Turkey. Its population is 174 (2021).
