= Taşdam, Eğil =

Village in Turkey

Taşdam
- Neighbourhood
- Location in Turkey
- Coordinates: 38°09′N 40°01′E
- Country: Turkey
- Province: Diyarbakır
- District: Eğil
- Population (2022): 130
- Time zone: UTC+3 (TRT)

Taşdam (Kurdish: Mûsan) is a neighbourhood in the municipality and district of Eğil, Diyarbakır Province in Turkey. It is populated by Kurds and had a population of 130 in 2022.
