= Yukarıhaydan, Eğil =

Village in Turkey

Yukarıhaydan
- Neighbourhood
- Location in Turkey
- Coordinates: 38°14′02″N 39°58′30″E
- Country: Turkey
- Province: Diyarbakır
- District: Eğil
- Population (2022): 462
- Time zone: UTC+3 (TRT)
- Postal code: 21470

Yukarıhaydan is a neighbourhood in the municipality and district of Eğil, Diyarbakır Province in Turkey. Its population is 462 (2022).
