= Başköy, Cide =

Village in Turkey

Başköy
- Village
- Location in Turkey
- Coordinates: 41°46′42″N 32°51′46″E
- Country: Turkey
- Province: Kastamonu
- District: Cide
- Population (2021): 119
- Time zone: UTC+3 (TRT)

Başköy is a village in the Cide District of Kastamonu Province in Turkey. Its population is 119 (2021).
