= Gökçeören, Cide =

Village in Turkey

Gökçeören
- Village
- Location within Turkey
- Coordinates: 41°53′N 33°13′E
- Country: Turkey
- Province: Kastamonu
- District: Cide
- Population (2021): 277
- Time zone: UTC+3 (TRT)

Gökçeören (formerly Terme) is a village in the Cide District, Kastamonu Province, Turkey. Its population is 277 (2021).
