= Kalecik, Eğil =

Village in Turkey

Kalecik
- Neighbourhood
- Location in Turkey
- Coordinates: 38°15′17″N 40°10′30″E
- Country: Turkey
- Province: Diyarbakır
- District: Eğil
- Population (2022): 204
- Time zone: UTC+3 (TRT)

Kalecik (Kurdish: Amînî) is a neighbourhood in the municipality and district of Eğil, Diyarbakır Province in Turkey. It is populated by Kurds and had a population of 204 in 2022.
