= Konuklar, Cide =

Village in Turkey

Konuklar
- Village
- Location in Turkey
- Coordinates: 41.944°N 33.166°E
- Country: Turkey
- Province: Kastamonu
- District: Cide
- Population (2021): 132
- Time zone: UTC+3 (TRT)

Konuklar is a village in the Cide District of Kastamonu Province in Turkey. Its population is 132 (2021).
