= Meşeler, Eğil =

Village in Turkey

Meşeler
- Neighbourhood
- Location within Turkey
- Coordinates: 38°14′49″N 40°12′54″E
- Country: Turkey
- Province: Diyarbakır
- District: Eğil
- Population (2022): 1,072
- Time zone: UTC+3 (TRT)

Meşeler (Kurdish: Inciya) is a neighbourhood in the municipality and district of Eğil, Diyarbakır Province in Turkey. It is populated by Kurds and had a population of 1,072 in 2022.
