= Öveçler, Cide =

Village in Turkey

Öveçler
- Village
- Location in Turkey
- Coordinates: 41.796°N 32.992°E
- Country: Turkey
- Province: Kastamonu
- District: Cide
- Population (2021): 82
- Time zone: UTC+3 (TRT)

Öveçler is a village in the Cide District of Kastamonu Province in Turkey. Its population is 82 (2021).
