= Gürünlü, Eğil =

Village in Turkey

Gürünlü
- Neighbourhood
- Location in Turkey
- Coordinates: 38°16′N 39°58′E
- Country: Turkey
- Province: Diyarbakır
- District: Eğil
- Population (2022): 327
- Time zone: UTC+3 (TRT)

Gürünlü (Kurdish: Birsin) is a neighbourhood in the municipality and district of Eğil, Diyarbakır Province in Turkey. It is populated by Kurds and had a population of 327 in 2022.
