= Yatır, Eğil =

Village in Diyarbakır, Turkey

Yatır
- Neighbourhood
- Location in Turkey
- Coordinates: 38°08′47″N 40°09′23″E
- Country: Turkey
- Province: Diyarbakır
- District: Eğil
- Population (2022): 595
- Time zone: UTC+3 (TRT)

Yatır (Kurdish: Şevêlyan) is a neighbourhood in the municipality and district of Eğil, Diyarbakır Province in Turkey. It is populated by Kurds and had a population of 595 in 2022.
