= Çukurçal, Cide =

Village in Turkey

Çukurçal
- Village
- Location in Turkey
- Coordinates: 41°49′53″N 32°57′57″E
- Country: Turkey
- Province: Kastamonu
- District: Cide
- Population (2021): 123
- Time zone: UTC+3 (TRT)

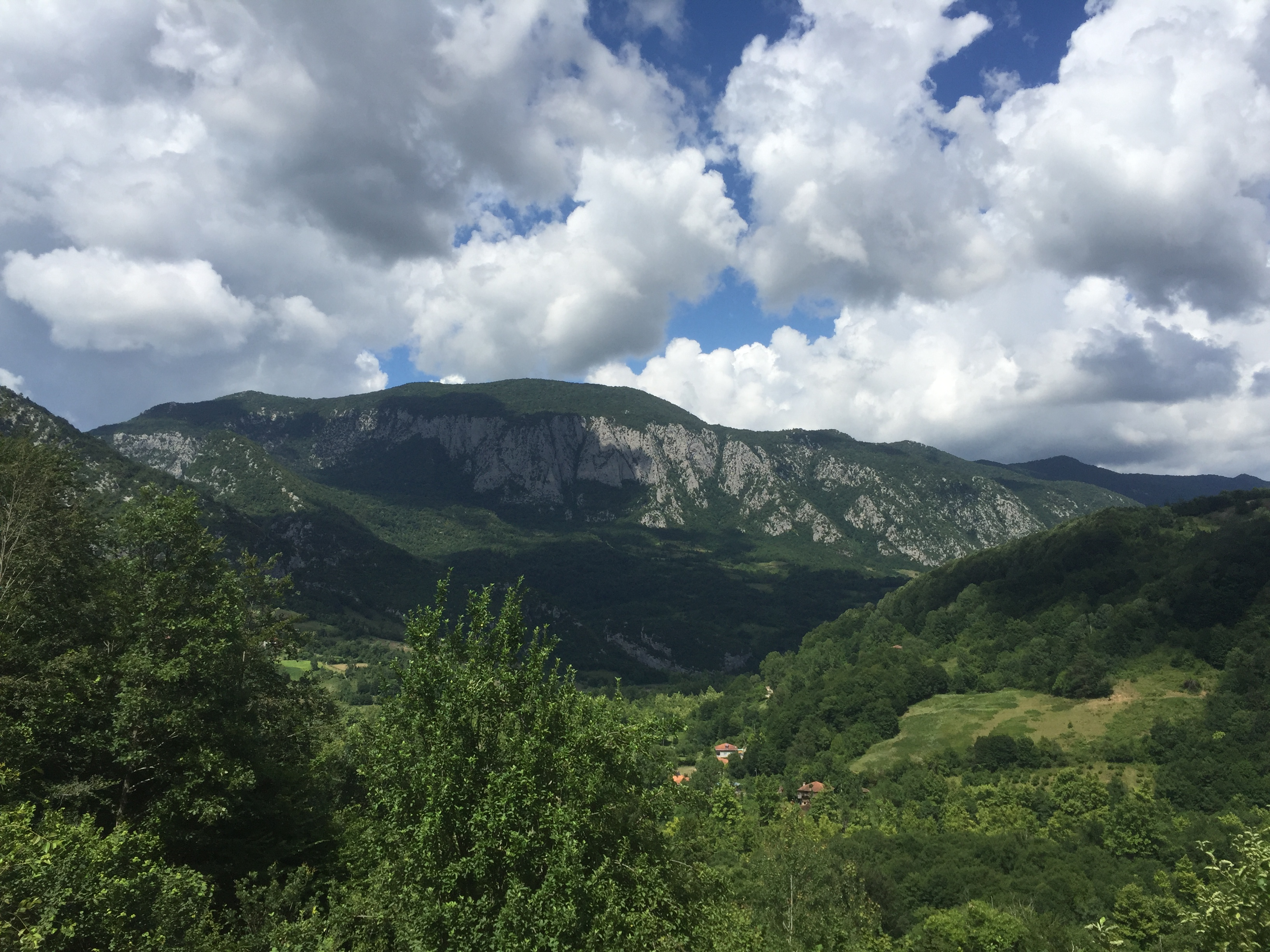
Küre Mountains National Park, Çukurçal village, Cide, Kastamonu

Çukurçal is a village in the Cide District of Kastamonu Province in Turkey. Its population is 123 (2021).
