= Reading 5–7 Arsenal =

Reading vs Arsenal
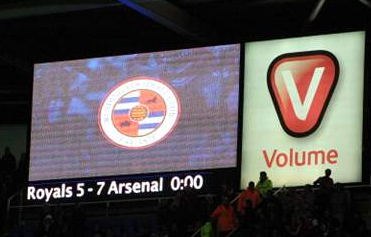
- The scoreboard following the final whistle.
- Event: 2012–13 Football League Cup
Reading	Arsenal
5	7
- After extra time
- Date: 30 October 2012
- Venue: Madejski Stadium, Reading
- Referee: Kevin Friend (Leicestershire)
- Attendance: 23,980
- Weather: Clear, 6 °C (43 °F)

The 2012–13 Football League Cup fourth round tie pitted Premier League sides Reading and Arsenal to contest for a quarter-final spot. The match ended in a 7–5 win for Arsenal, in the highest-scoring match in League Cup history. Reading had taken a 4–0 lead in the first half, but Theo Walcott reduced the deficit in first-half stoppage time. This was followed by second-half goals from Olivier Giroud, Laurent Koscielny and Theo Walcott as the match ended 4–4 after full time. In extra-time, Arsenal took the lead through Marouane Chamakh, before Pavel Pogrebnyak made it 5–5 with five minutes remaining; however late goals from Theo Walcott (to complete his hat-trick) and Chamakh handed Arsenal victory.

The match is regarded as one of the most entertaining of recent history. It is the joint highest-scoring match in the history of Arsenal; it is also the joint-highest scoring match in English League Cup history, though at the time it was the outright record. The match was the first time in Arsenal's history that they had come back from three or more goals down to win a match, and the first time they had netted seven in an away tie since the 7–0 win at Standard Liège in the 1993–94 European Cup Winners' Cup.

Arsenal lined up in a 4–5–1/4–2–3–1 formation, with Theo Walcott and Andrey Arshavin shifting between winging midfield and attack to support lone striker Marouane Chamakh. Reading meanwhile set up with six changes from their last game; Arsenal made eleven.

== Background ==
This game marked the tenth occasion that Reading and Arsenal had played each other, with the Gunners favourites to win the tie. They had won all ten previous meetings with "The Royals"; their most recent meeting had come in the Premier League in April 2008, which the Gunners won 2–0. Arsenal were aiming to reach the last eight of the League Cup for the tenth successive season. Pre-match, Arsenal stood 6th in Premier League, some six points off the top; in contrast Reading were 18th and one of two winless sides. Arsenal had started the Premier League season well, not losing until the sixth match and not conceding until the fourth, a 6–1 home win over Southampton; however defeats to Chelsea and Norwich City had pushed them down the table. Meanwhile, Reading, newly promoted after winning the Championship the previous season, had struggled to get to grips with the English top-flight. A 1–1 home draw with Stoke City on the opening day was followed by four defeats in the next seven matches, which left them 19th; however, the Royals had a game in hand, after their away game against Sunderland was postponed due to a waterlogged pitch. However, a pair of 3–2 wins, first at home to Peterborough United, and then at Queens Park Rangers in the League Cup had set up the tie with Arsenal, who had defeated Coventry City 6–1 at the Emirates Stadium in the third round.

The two sides had first met on 16 February 1935, in the FA Cup fifth round, where a goal from Cliff Bastin resulted in a 1–0 away victory for Arsenal. They would meet a further three times before the turn of the century-all in domestic cup ties-and it was not until the 2006–07 Premier League season that the two sides would meet in league competition. Arsenal won both games, 4–0 at the Madejski and 2–1 at Highbury. Arsenal had up to that point scored 21 times against Reading; the Royals had, conversely, scored just four times in the fixture.

== Pre-match ==
At the Arsenal Annual General Meeting, manager Arsène Wenger had made it clear that the League Cup was fifth on his list of priorities; the Premier League, Champions League, FA Cup and top four all were more important, according to Wenger. This statement had come after poor displays against Norwich City and Schalke 04; both games had ended in defeats. Arsenal responded to this with a narrow victory against QPR at the Emirates Stadium, Mikel Arteta scoring a late winner. Reading manager Brian McDermott, having won the League Managers Association Championship Manager of the Year the previous campaign, had insisted that his players deserved a lot of credit after their 90th-minute equaliser at home to Fulham, but conceded that they needed to "finish the job off", with his team having taken the lead four times in the Premier League that season and still not won.

McDermott had named a near full-strength team in the 3–2 third round win at QPR, but still made six changes to the side that drew 3–3 with Fulham in the Premier League, including swapping goalkeeper Alex McCarthy with Adam Federici. A deep-lying 4–4–2 was selected by McDermott, with Jason Roberts and Noel Hunt being paired up front. Captain Kaspars Gorkss retained his place. Arsenal meanwhile made eleven changes as Arsène Wenger rested numerous first-team players following their hard-fought home win over QPR; a 4–5–1 formation was favoured by the Frenchman, with Andrey Arshavin and Theo Walcott to shift from midfield in support of Marouane Chamakh, with Johan Djourou captaining the side.

== Match ==
=== Overview ===
Arsenal kicked off the match in their classic red shirts with white sleeves; Reading in their home strip of blue and white hoops. Reading started the match on the front foot, hitting the post in the 3rd minute through Sean Morrison, before a Jay Tabb shot was blocked in the 9th minute. But three minutes later, Reading had their goal. Andrey Arshavin gave the ball away and the home side quickly countered, with Jason Roberts firing in Hal Robson-Kanu`s cross to give Reading a "deserved" advantage. It was soon 2–0, with Chris Gunter firing the ball in from the byline, where Laurent Koscielny attempted to divert clear, only to stab the ball into his own net. Just two minutes later, and Mikele Leigertwood had made it three. Seizing the ball after a cleared corner, he struck a fierce effort which was punched into the Arsenal goal by Emiliano Martinez. With eight minutes to go before half-time, a fast break from Reading saw Leigertwood find Garath McCleary out wide, and his cross was nodded in by Noel Hunt to make it 4–0 Reading.

Two minutes of added time were awarded; in the last of those, a neat through-ball from Andrey Arshavin found Walcott in space, and the Englishman's dinked finish made it 4–1 at half-time.

The second half started with penalty calls from both sides, with Chamakh being booked for complaining about the latter one, and a post being struck by Walcott. Despite there being chances at both ends, it was Arsenal who struck first in the second half, Olivier Giroud steering a header into the far corner after a well-taken Walcott corner. Arsenal continued to dominate the second half, but did not get the crucial third goal until another Walcott corner was headed in-this time by Koscielny, who made amends for his first-half own goal to make it 4–3. Time was running out before Walcott surged into the box and fired towards goal, but the ball was seemingly hooked away by Nicky Shorey before being fired in by Carl Jenkinson. The goal was credited to Walcott however, though it was not without controversy, as the goal had been scored in the 96th minute, with only four minutes of stoppage time being awarded. The game finished 4–4 and the game went to extra time, though first Olivier Giroud and Francis Coquelin had to collect his shirt from the crowd after throwing it in, seemingly thinking it was full-time.

Extra-time started with early chances for substitute Thomas Eisfeld and Arshavin, neither of whom converted. Half-time was drawing near when neat play on the left-hand side saw Arshavin lay the ball off to Chamakh, who scored his first goal in over a year to make it 5–4 to Arsenal. With five minutes to go, a cross from Robson-Kanu evaded the Arsenal defenders and came to Gunter, whose deflected cross was nodded in by Pavel Pogrebnyak to make it 5–5. Reading now had the initiative, but had just two minutes of stoppage time. However, it was Arsenal who scored the crucial sixth goal after Arshavin saw his shot blocked by Federici before Walcott sruck to make it 6–5. But the scoring still was not done. After a final Reading attack, Walcott cleared the ball away only for Gunter to miss his header and give Chamakh a one-on-one with Federici, and his calm lobbed finish saw Arsenal make it 7–5. It proved to be the last act of the game, as Arsenal qualified for the quarter-finals of the EFL Cup for a tenth consecutive season.

=== Details ===
30 October 2012
19:45 BST

Reading	5–7 (a.e.t.)	Arsenal
Roberts 12'; Koscielny 18' (o.g.); Leigertwood 20'; Hunt 37'; Pogrebnyak 115'	Report	Walcott 45+2', 90+6', 120+1'; Giroud 64'; Koscielny 89'; Chamakh 103', 120+3'

Madejski Stadium, Reading
Attendance: 23,980
Referee: Kevin Friend (Leicestershire)

GK	1	(Australia) Adam Federici
RB	2	(Wales) Chris Gunter
CB	17	(Latvia) Kaspars Gorkšs (c)
CB	15	(England) Sean Morrison (yellow card)
LB	3	(England) Nicky Shorey
DM	8	(Antigua and Barbuda) Mikele Leigertwood (yellow card)
RM	12	(Jamaica) Garath McCleary (substituted off) 73'
LM	16	(Republic of Ireland) Jay Tabb
AM	19	(Wales) Hal Robson-Kanu
CF	33	(Grenada) Jason Roberts (substituted off) 90+3'
CF	10	(Republic of Ireland) Noel Hunt (substituted off) 73'
Substitutes:
FW	7	(Russia) Pavel Pogrebnyak (substituted on) 73'
FW	11	(Jamaica) Jobi McAnuff (substituted on) 73'
FW	18	(Wales) Simon Church (substituted on) 90+3'
Manager:
(England) Brian McDermott

GK	36	(Argentina) Emiliano Martínez
CB	20	(Switzerland) Johan Djourou (c)
CB	6	(France) Laurent Koscielny (yellow card)
CB	54	(Spain) Ignasi Miquel (substituted off) 105' (yellow card)
RM	25	(England) Carl Jenkinson
CM	26	(Ghana) Emmanuel Frimpong (substituted off) 62'
CM	22	(France) Francis Coquelin
LM	47	(Germany) Serge Gnabry (substituted off) 62'
RF	14	(England) Theo Walcott
CF	29	(Morocco) Marouane Chamakh (yellow card)
LF	23	(Russia) Andrey Arshavin
Substitutes:
FW	12	(France) Olivier Giroud (substituted on) 62' (yellow card)
MF	46	(Germany) Thomas Eisfeld (substituted on) 62' (yellow card)
DF	53	(England) Jernade Meade (substituted on) 105'
Manager:
(France) Arsène Wenger

Match rules

- 90 minutes, extra time or penalties if scores level.
- Winner qualifies for the quarter-final, loser eliminated.
- Seven named substitutes.
- Maximum of three substitutions.

== Post-match and reaction ==
This match is widely regarded as one of the most remarkable of modern times. It is also thought to be one of the finest comebacks in football history; it was the first time Arsenal had ever come back from a deficit of more than three goals to win.

Arsène Wenger described the Arsenal comeback as something that took them from "disaster to pride", stating "you cannot play for Arsenal and give up. It was 4–0 and could have been one or two more. We came back but at 89 minutes it was still 4–2. Then the miracle happened. There were so many turning points. Our first goal before half-time was important. It's my first 7–5. It was a tennis score." Wenger offered some consolation to McDermott: "I know how it feels to lose a 4–0 lead – it happened to me at Newcastle. I always hoped we could come back. It's strange to explain. At 4–0 you think you have won the game, but at 4–2 the panic starts to set in. At 4–0 I didn't feel great, I started to think about half-time. Inspiration was not difficult. I just felt sorry for the fans, they stuck with us. A big part stayed and supported us and I give them credit. I give the ones who left less credit. This was maybe my greatest comeback. [The League Cup] is not my priority but had we gone out like we could have gone out it would not have been one of my proudest nights."

Reading manager Brian McDermott said that the defeat was the worst of his career. "It was kamikaze football. It was extraordinary," he said. "It's the worst defeat of my career. It is embarrassing but we have to take it on the chin and move on. It's hard to take positives but we have to." He did, however, criticise referee Kevin Friend after Walcott's 96th-minute goal, despite only four minutes of stoppage time being awarded. "Obviously it doesn't help that the referee added two minutes on to the four minutes of injury time to make it six. You can't tell the time as wrong as that, but he did." The turning point, in his eyes, was the Walcott goal just before half-time. "I wasn't comfortable at 4–1. I don't know why, I just wasn't. We had to go in at 4–0. That gave them impetus they didn't need. It was suicide what went on in that second half and extra time. At full-time nothing needed to be said to the players. Sometimes the less said the better. We know what happened."

The result did not, as hoped, have an immediate effect on what had been an inconsistent start to the season for Arsenal; in the next match, they were defeated by eventual Premier League champions Manchester United 2–1 at Old Trafford. This sparked a run of just three wins in nine matches, before a three-match winning run culminated in another record-breaking match, Walcott netting another hat-trick in a 7–3 home win over Newcastle United, but at the turn of the year had failed to win over half of their league matches; however just five defeats after New Year's Day saw them overhaul Tottenham Hotspur and finish fourth in the league. However, Arsenal's League Cup campaign ended with a 3–2 penalty shootout defeat to League Two side Bradford City in the next round.

Reading meanwhile continued their poor form, not winning a league game until November and winning just six all season as they ultimately finished 19th, eleven points from safety. Both sides met twice in the league; the Gunners triumphed on both occasions, 5–2 at the Madejski in December, and 4–1 at the Emirates in March. They have since faced each other twice more, in the FA Cup semi-final, and in the League Cup in 2016–17. Arsenal won on both occasions, extending their perfect record against the Royals to 14 matches.

=== Records ===
There were several records set in this match, including the following:

- Highest-scoring League Cup match of all time(now joint).
- Joint highest-scoring match in Arsenal history.
- First time Arsenal had ever come from 3+ goals down to win a match.
- Joint-most goals scored by Arsenal in an away match(7).
- Most goals scored in extra-time in an Arsenal match.

== See also ==
- 2012–13 Football League Cup
- 2012–13 Arsenal F.C. season
- 2012–13 Reading F.C. season
- 2012–13 in English football
