= İshakça, Cide =

Village in Turkey

İshakça
- Village
- Location in Turkey
- Coordinates: 41.908°N 33.248°E
- Country: Turkey
- Province: Kastamonu
- District: Cide
- Population (2021): 182
- Time zone: UTC+3 (TRT)

İshakça is a village in the Cide District of Kastamonu Province in Turkey. Its population is 182 (2021).
