= Eğil =

- District and municipality
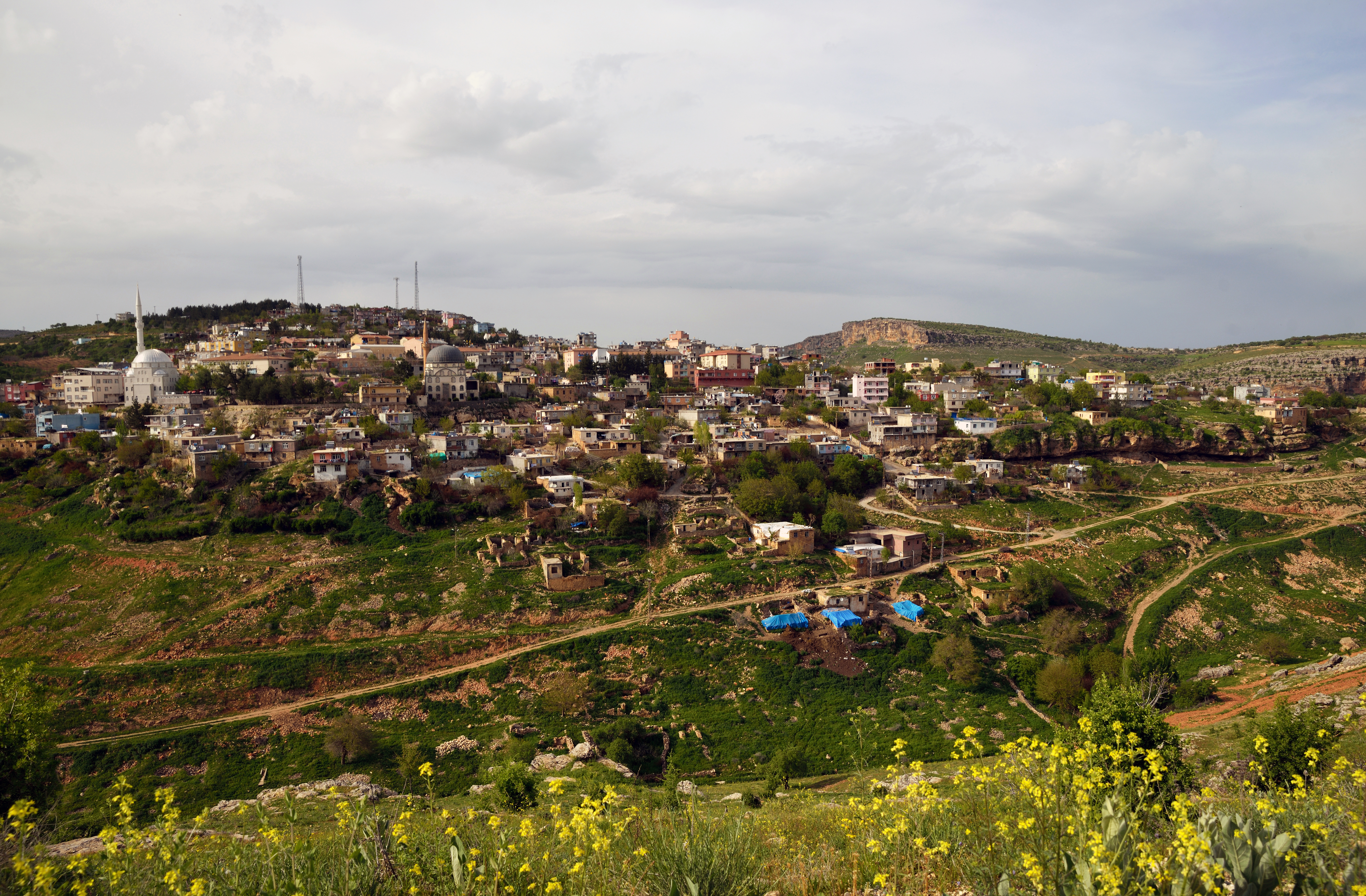

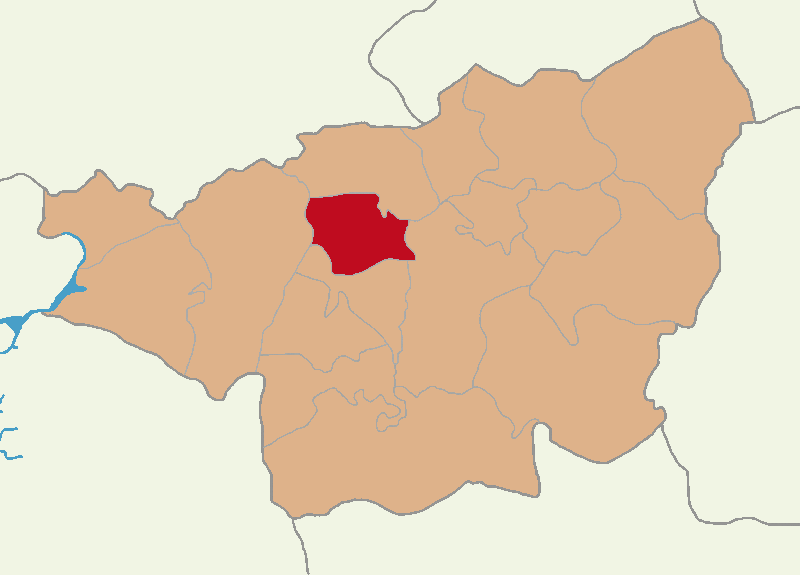
- Map showing Eğil District in Diyarbakır Province

- Location within Turkey
- Coordinates: 38°15′26″N 40°05′05″E
- Country: Turkey
- Province: Diyarbakır
- Area: 449 km^{2} (173 sq mi)
- Population (2022): 21,434
  - Density: 47.7/km^{2} (124/sq mi)
- Time zone: UTC+3 (TRT)
- Postal code: 21470
- Area code: 0412
- Website: www.egil.bel.tr

Eğil (Hittite: 𒅔𒃲𒀀𒉿, romanized: Ingalawa; Ottoman Turkish: اکيل; Kurdish: Gêl) is a municipality and district of Diyarbakır Province, Turkey. Its area is 449 km^{2}, and its population is 21,434 (2022). It is populated by Kurds.

The elected mayor Mustafa Akkul of the Peoples' Democratic Party (HDP) was dismissed on the 23 March 2020 and replaced by a trustee. The current Kaymakam is Volkan Hür.

Eğil is an ancient city 50 km away from Diyarbakır with many ancient forts and caves dating to the time of the Armenian kingdom of Sophene. It is identified with Carcathiocerta, the capital of the Kingdom of Sophene, and the ancient Armenian religious center of Angegh-tun (Angełtun).

In 2018 parts of a village re-emerged in Eğil in the Çakırören neighbourhood, after the Dicle Dam suffered water level decrease due to a burst of one of the gates. It is also the location of a supposed tomb of Elisha, which is located in the Kale neighborhood of Eğil.

== History ==
Most scholars identify Eğil with the ancient city of Carcathiocerta (Armenian: Կարկաթիոկերտ, Karkatiokert or Արկաթիակերտ, Arkatiakert; Ancient Greek: Καρκαθιόκερτα, Karkathiokerta). It was the first capital of Sophene until Arsames I founded the new capital Arshamshat around 230 BCE. Its original site is located on a rocky plateau just east of Eğil (38°15′17″N 40°05′34″E). The Seleucid king Antiochus IV Epiphanes renamed the city into Epiphania. Strabo in his Geography, calls it "The royal city of Sophene". It was assigned to the late Roman province of Mesopotamia. It also bore the names Artagigarta, Baras, Basileon Phrourion, and Ingila. Under the name Ingila, it became a bishopric; no longer the seat of a residential bishop, it remains a titular see of the Roman Catholic Church.

The city was known as Ingalawa by the Hittites.

The city, with its strategic location overlooking the west bank of the Tigris, is the oldest in the region, with remains dating back to the Assyrian and Hellenistic periods. Later on, the city was known in Armenian as Angł, capital of the district of Angełtun, which was known as Ingilene in Greco-Roman sources. It was part of the larger province of Sophene. Armenian sources described Angł as housing "the tombs of the former kings of Armenia", apparently taking the rulers of Sophene as a branch of the Armenian kings' dynasty. The rock-cut tombs still exist today at Eğil.

== Composition ==
There are 30 neighbourhoods in Eğil District:

- Akalan
- Aşağıdöşemeler
- Babalar
- Bahşılar
- Balaban
- Balım
- Baysu
- Dere
- Düzlük
- Gündoğuran
- Gürünlü
- Ilgın
- Kale
- Kalecik
- Kalkan
- Kayaköyü
- Kazanlı
- Kırkkuyu
- Konak
- Meşeler
- Oyalı
- Sağlam
- Sarıca
- Sarmaşık
- Selman
- Taşdam
- Tepecik
- Yatır
- Yenişehir
- Yukarıhaydan

== Notable people ==
- Muammer Yıldırım, footballer
- Zelal Baturay, Footballer

== Gallery ==
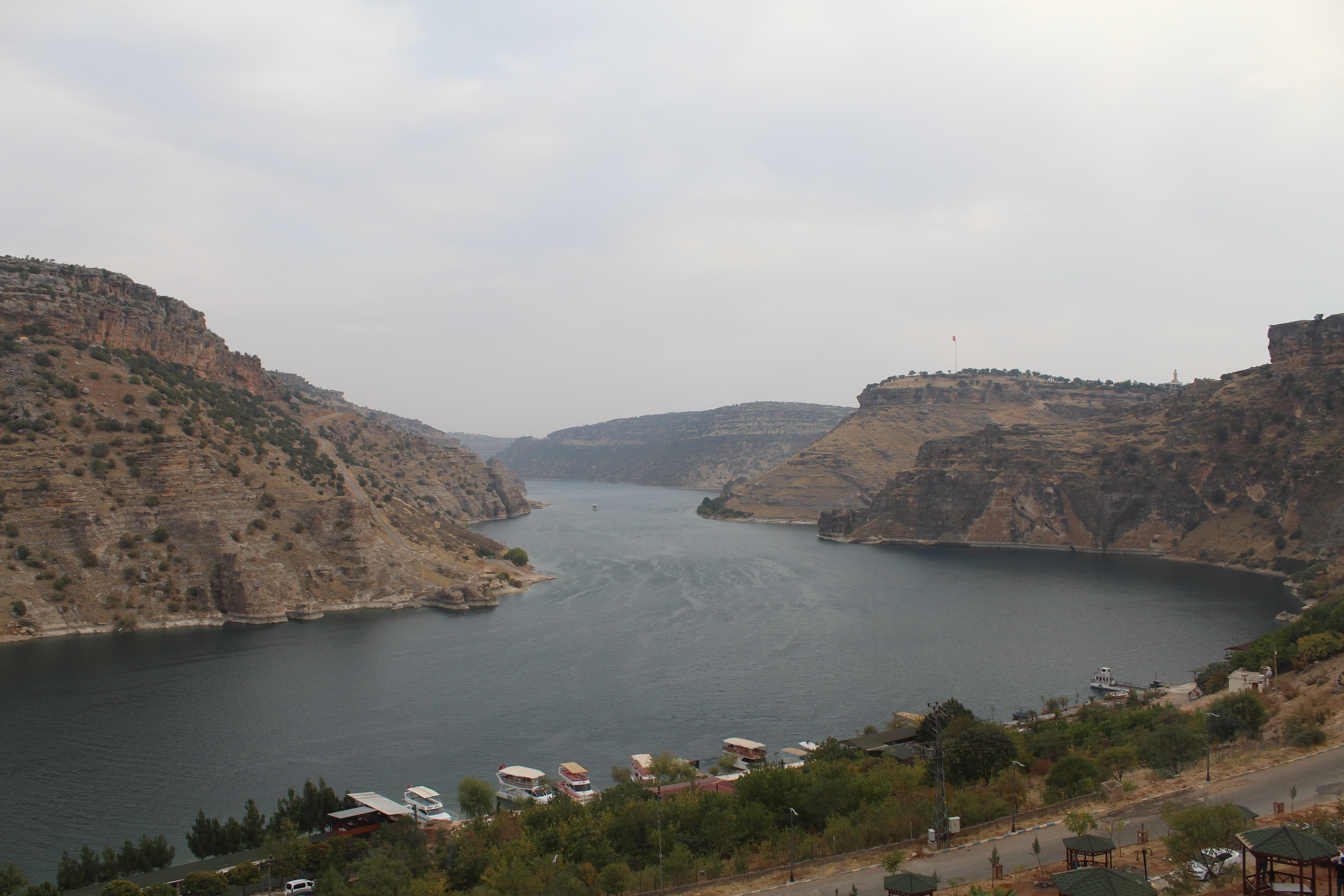
Eğil Dam Reservoir

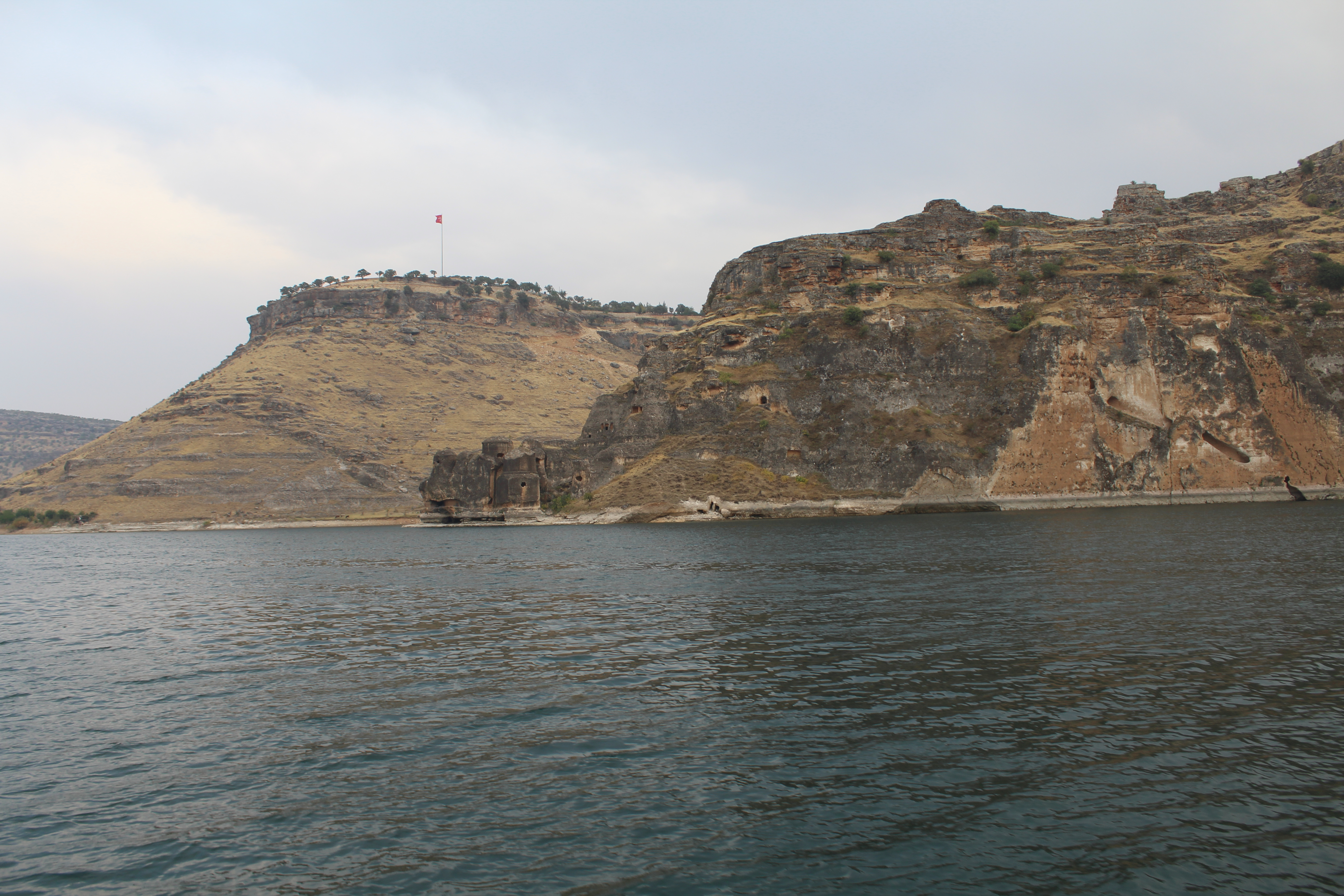
Eğil Dam Reservoir

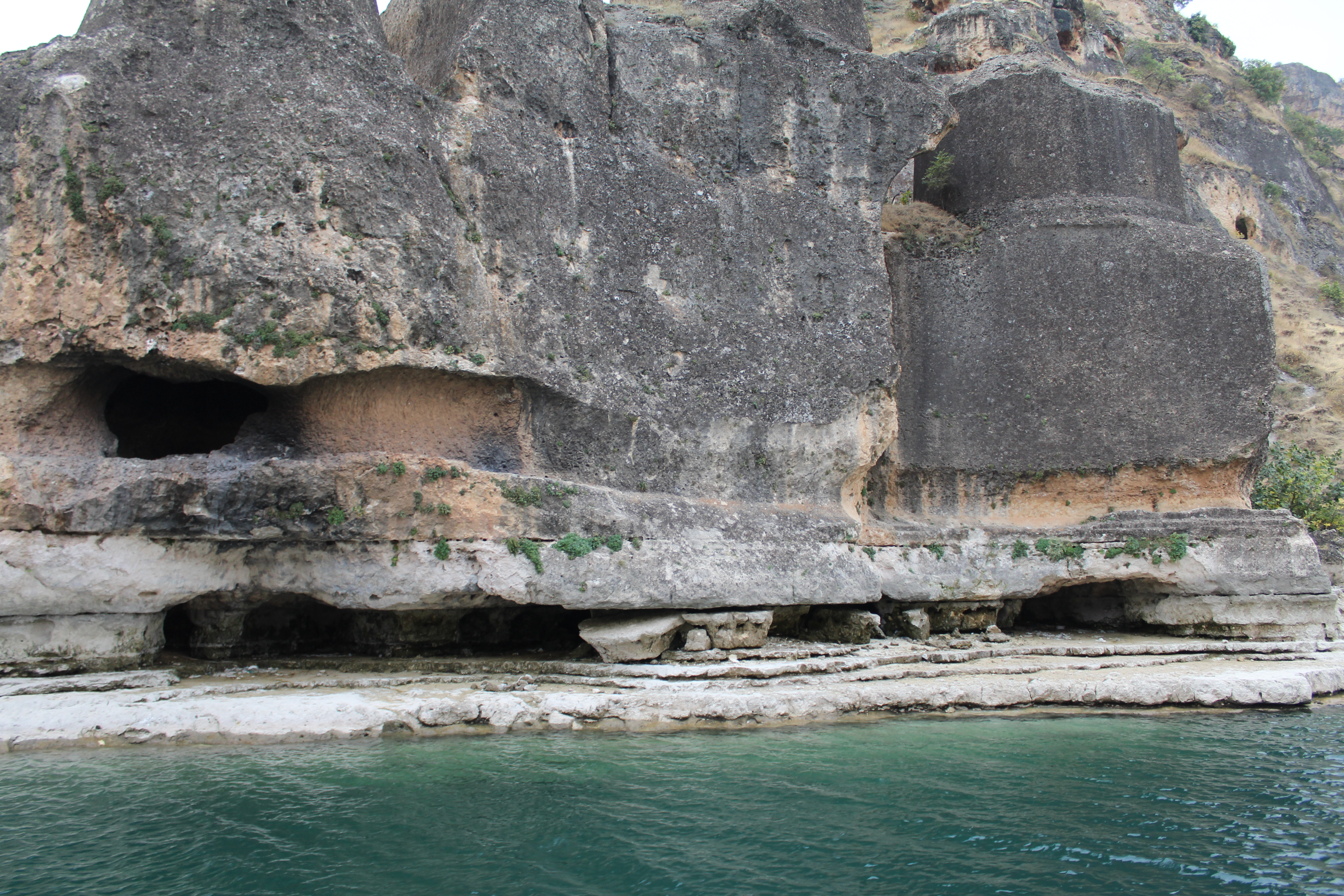
Eğil King Tombs

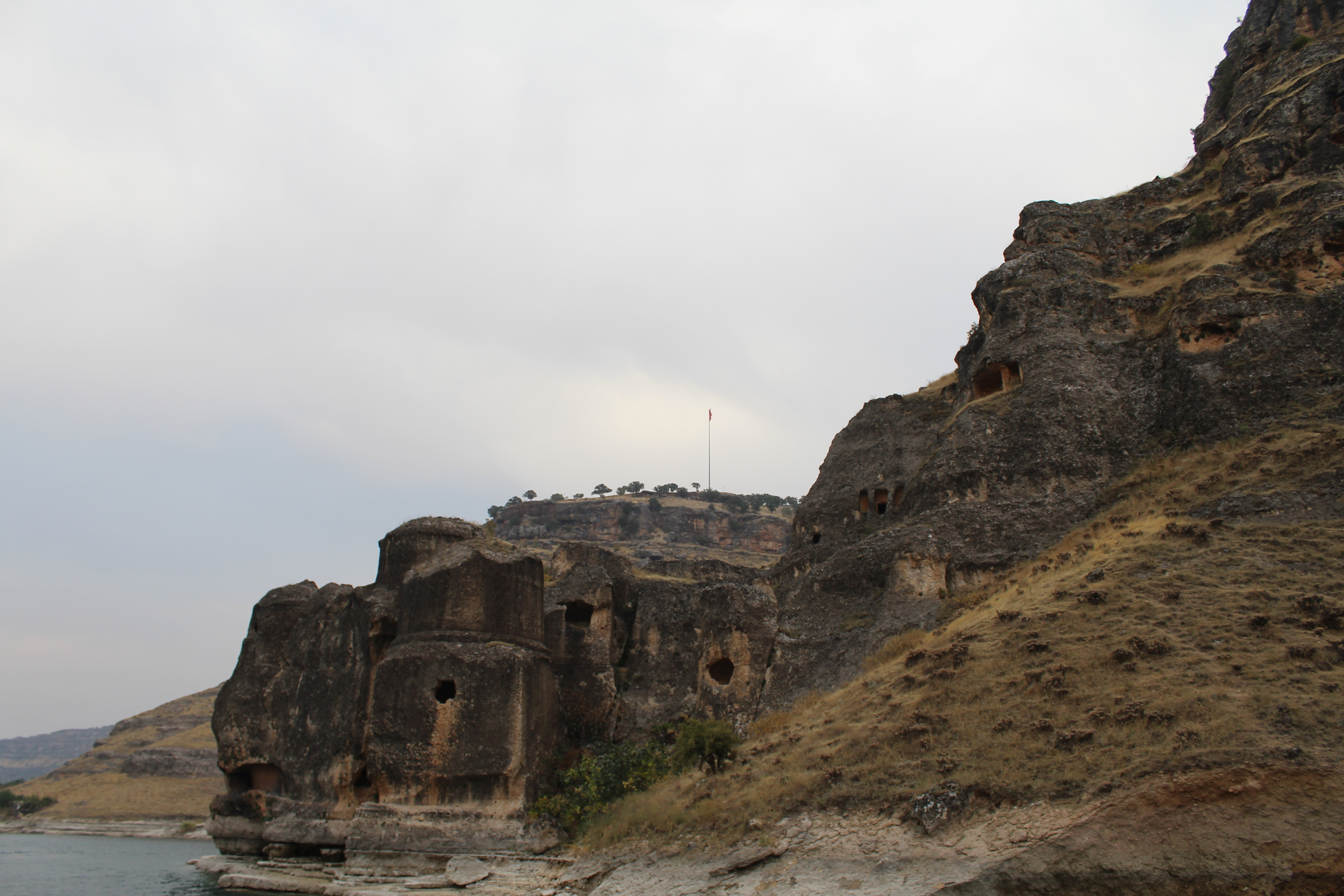
Eğil King Tombs

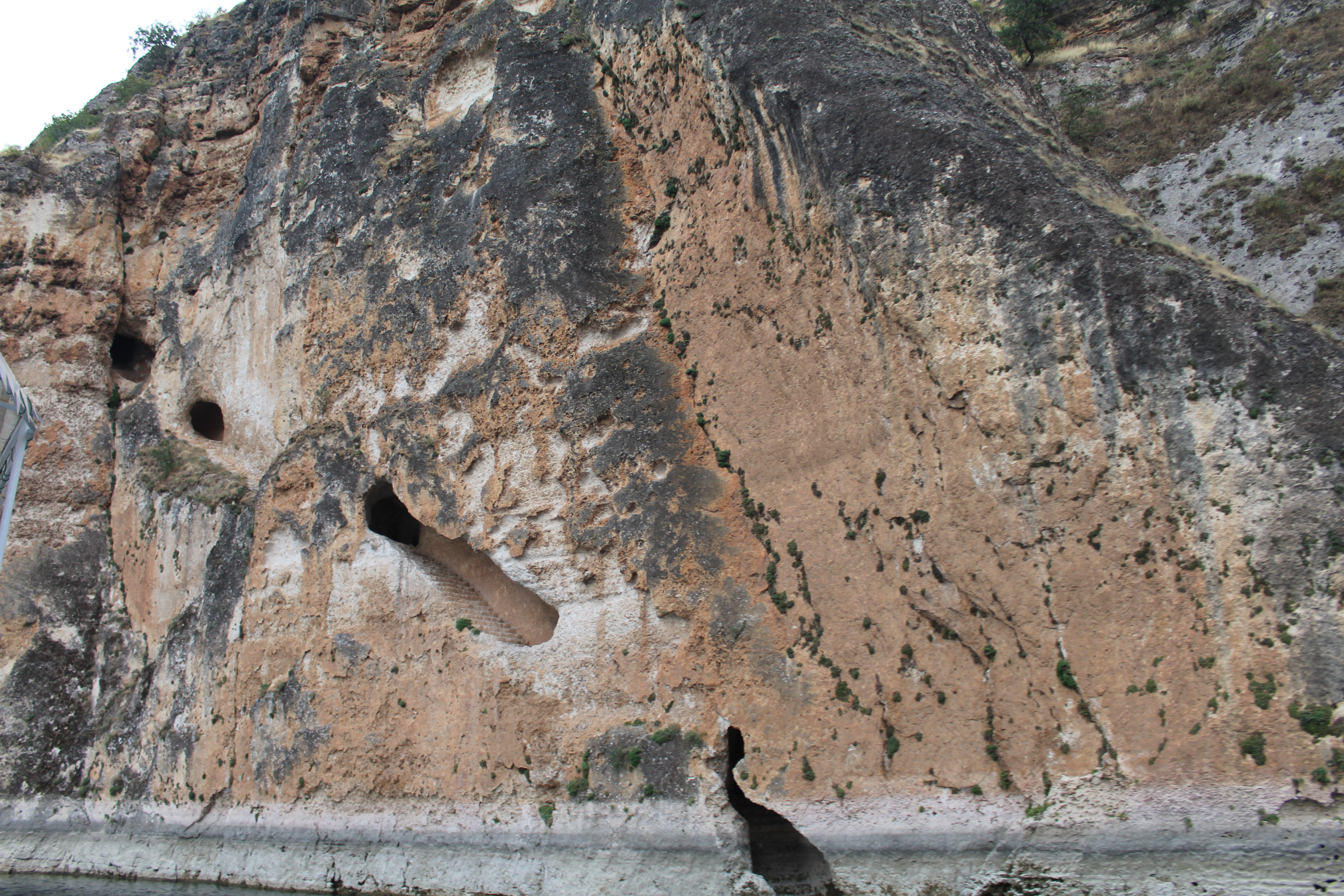
Eğil King Tombs

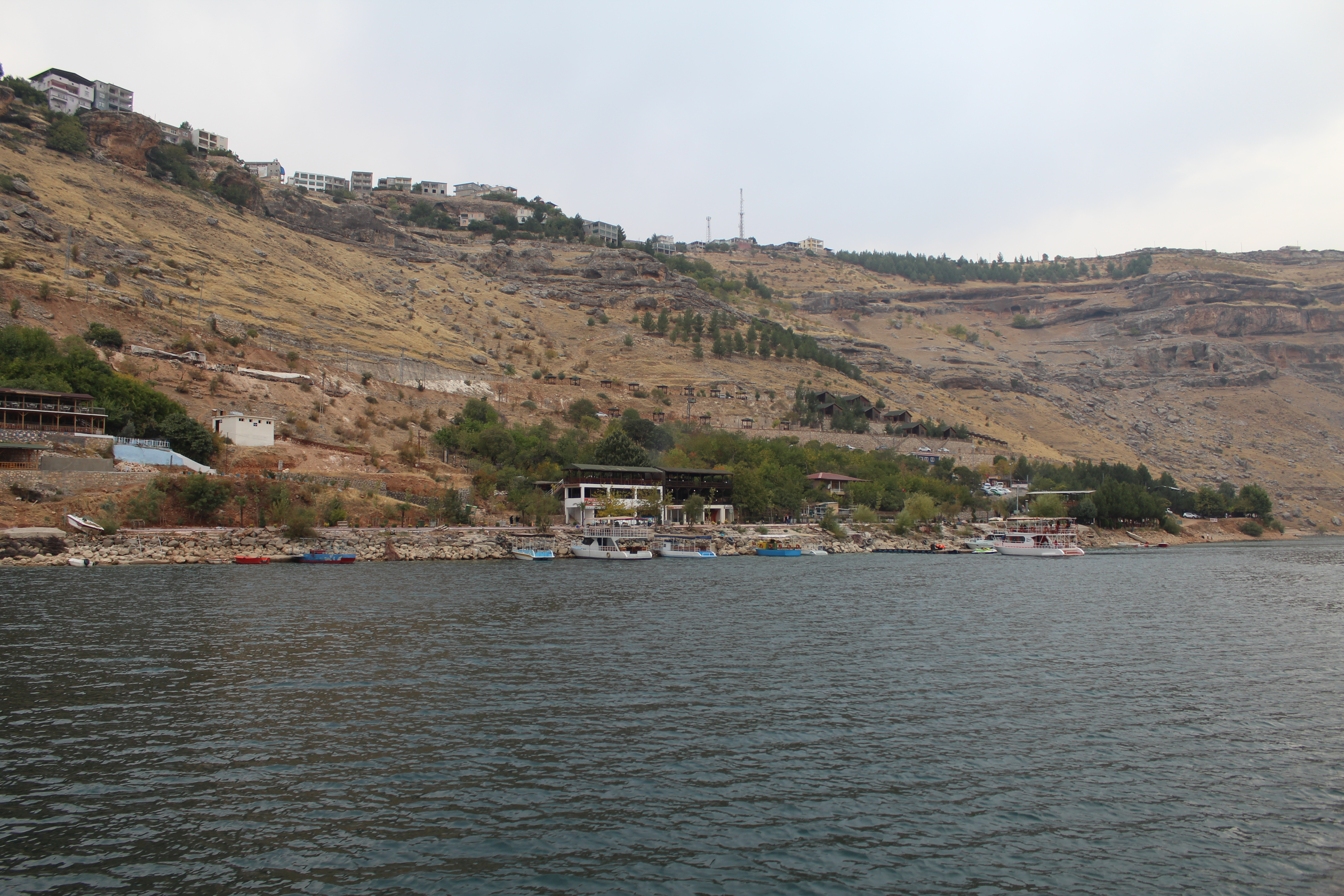
Eğil
