= Düzlük, Eğil =

Village in Turkey

Düzlük
- Neighbourhood
- Location in Turkey
- Coordinates: 38°11′57″N 40°14′19″E
- Country: Turkey
- Province: Diyarbakır
- District: Eğil
- Population (2022): 635
- Time zone: UTC+3 (TRT)

Düzlük (Kurdish: Kupîyan) is a neighbourhood in the municipality and district of Eğil, Diyarbakır Province in Turkey. It is populated by Kurds and had a population of 635 in 2022.
