= Kapısuyu, Cide =

Village in Turkey

Kapısuyu
- Village
- Location in Turkey
- Coordinates: 41.844°N 32.757°E
- Country: Turkey
- Province: Kastamonu
- District: Cide
- Population (2021): 48
- Time zone: UTC+3 (TRT)

Kapısuyu is a village in the Cide District of Kastamonu Province in Turkey. Its population is 48 (2021).
