= Yıldızalan, Cide =

Village in Turkey

Yıldızalan
- Village
- Location in Turkey
- Coordinates: 41°46′58″N 32°52′53″E
- Country: Turkey
- Province: Kastamonu
- District: Cide
- Population (2021): 74
- Time zone: UTC+3 (TRT)

Yıldızalan is a village in the Cide District of Kastamonu Province in Turkey. Its population is 74 (2021).
