= Aşağıdöşemeler, Eğil =

Village in Turkey

Aşağıdöşemeler
- Neighbourhood
- Location in Turkey
- Coordinates: 38°13′19″N 40°07′20″E
- Country: Turkey
- Province: Diyarbakır
- District: Eğil
- Population (2022): 360
- Time zone: UTC+3 (TRT)

Aşağıdöşemeler (Kurdish: Ferşika) is a neighbourhood in the municipality and district of Eğil, Diyarbakır Province in Turkey. It is populated by Kurds and had a population of 360 in 2022.
