= Alayüz, Cide =

Village in Turkey

Alayüz
- Village
- Location in Turkey
- Coordinates: 41°57′19″N 33°11′21″E
- Country: Turkey
- Province: Kastamonu
- District: Cide
- Population (2021): 152
- Time zone: UTC+3 (TRT)

Alayüz is a village in the Cide District of Kastamonu Province in Turkey. Its population is 152 (2021).
