= Balım, Eğil =

Village in Turkey

Balım
- Neighbourhood
- Location in Turkey
- Coordinates: 38°17′46″N 40°05′17″E
- Country: Turkey
- Province: Diyarbakır
- District: Eğil
- Population (2022): 300
- Time zone: UTC+3 (TRT)

Balım (Kurdish: Metmur) is a neighbourhood in the municipality and district of Eğil, Diyarbakır Province in Turkey. It is populated by Kurds and had a population of 300 in 2022.
