= Akbayır, Cide =

Village in Turkey

Akbayır
- Village
- Location in Turkey
- Coordinates: 41.971°N 33.231°E
- Country: Turkey
- Province: Kastamonu
- District: Cide
- Population (2021): 130
- Time zone: UTC+3 (TRT)

Akbayır is a village in the Cide District of Kastamonu Province in Turkey. Its population is 130 (2021).
