= Kalkan, Eğil =

Village in Turkey

Kalkan
- Neighbourhood
- Location in Turkey
- Coordinates: 38°8′51″N 40°04′31″E
- Country: Turkey
- Province: Diyarbakır
- District: Eğil
- Population (2022): 339
- Time zone: UTC+3 (TRT)

Kalkan (Kurdish: Şelbetin) is a neighbourhood in the municipality and district of Eğil, Diyarbakır Province in Turkey. It is populated by Kurds and had a population of 339 in 2022.
