= Kırkkuyu, Eğil =

Village in Turkey

Kırkkuyu
- Neighbourhood
- Location in Turkey
- Coordinates: 38°13′03″N 40°01′14″E
- Country: Turkey
- Province: Diyarbakır
- District: Eğil
- Population (2022): 170
- Time zone: UTC+3 (TRT)

Kırkkuyu (Kurdish: Çelbîran) is a neighbourhood in the municipality and district of Eğil, Diyarbakır Province in Turkey. It is populated by Kurds and had a population of 170 in 2022.
