= Kayaardı, Cide =

Village in Turkey

Kayaardı
- Village
- Location in Turkey
- Coordinates: 41°57′30″N 33°19′37″E
- Country: Turkey
- Province: Kastamonu
- District: Cide
- Population (2021): 146
- Time zone: UTC+3 (TRT)

Kayaardı is a village in the Cide District of Kastamonu Province in Turkey. Its population is 146 (2021).
