= Irmak, Cide =

Village in Turkey

Irmak
- Neighbourhood
- Location in Turkey
- Coordinates: 41.881°N 32.944°E
- Country: Turkey
- Province: Kastamonu
- District: Cide
- Municipality: Cide
- Population (2021): 580
- Time zone: UTC+3 (TRT)

Irmak is a neighbourhood of the town Cide, Cide District, Kastamonu Province, Turkey. Its population is 580 (2021).
