= Pehlivanlı, Cide =

Village in Turkey

Pehlivanlı
- Village
- Location in Turkey
- Coordinates: 41.912°N 33.181°E
- Country: Turkey
- Province: Kastamonu
- District: Cide
- Population (2021): 89
- Time zone: UTC+3 (TRT)

Pehlivanlı is a village in the Cide District of Kastamonu Province in Turkey. Its population is 89 (2021).
