= Emirler, Cide =

Village in Turkey

Emirler
- Village
- Location within Turkey
- Coordinates: 41°49′57″N 32°46′50″E
- Country: Turkey
- Province: Kastamonu
- District: Cide
- Population (2021): 114
- Time zone: UTC+3 (TRT)

Emirler is a village in the Cide District of Kastamonu Province in Turkey. Its population is 114 (2021).
