= Sarıca, Eğil =

Village in Turkey

Sarıca
- Neighbourhood
- Location in Turkey
- Coordinates: 38°10′08″N 40°14′49″E
- Country: Turkey
- Province: Diyarbakır
- District: Eğil
- Population (2022): 1,891
- Time zone: UTC+3 (TRT)

Sarıca (Kurdish: Sariceg) is a neighbourhood in the municipality and district of Eğil, Diyarbakır Province in Turkey. It is populated by Kurds and had a population of 1,891 in 2022.
