= Üçağıl, Cide =

Village in Turkey

Üçağıl
- Village
- Location in Turkey
- Coordinates: 41.895°N 33.224°E
- Country: Turkey
- Province: Kastamonu
- District: Cide
- Population (2021): 274
- Time zone: UTC+3 (TRT)

Üçağıl is a village in the Cide District of Kastamonu Province in Turkey. Its population is 274 (2021).
