= Tepecik, Eğil =

Village in Turkey

Tepecik
- Neighbourhood
- Location in Turkey
- Coordinates: 38°13′37″N 40°11′23″E
- Country: Turkey
- Province: Diyarbakır
- District: Eğil
- Population (2022): 351
- Time zone: UTC+3 (TRT)

Tepecik (Kurdish: Delucana) is a neighbourhood in the municipality and district of Eğil, Diyarbakır Province in Turkey. It is populated by Kurds and had a population of 351 in 2022.
