= Döngelce, Cide =

Village in Turkey

Döngelce
- Village
- Location in Turkey
- Coordinates: 41°47′30″N 32°46′27″E
- Country: Turkey
- Province: Kastamonu
- District: Cide
- Population (2021): 59
- Time zone: UTC+3 (TRT)

Döngelce is a village in the Cide District of Kastamonu Province in Turkey. Its population is 59 (2021).
