= Karakadı, Cide =

Village in Turkey

Karakadı
- Village
- Location in Turkey
- Coordinates: 41.797°N 33.057°E
- Country: Turkey
- Province: Kastamonu
- District: Cide
- Population (2021): 117
- Time zone: UTC+3 (TRT)

Karakadı is a village in the Cide District of Kastamonu Province in Turkey. Its population is 117 (2021).
