= Derebucağı, Cide =

Village in Turkey

Derebucağı
- Village
- Location in Turkey
- Coordinates: 41°47′35″N 33°00′33″E
- Country: Turkey
- Province: Kastamonu
- District: Cide
- Population (2021): 124
- Time zone: UTC+3 (TRT)

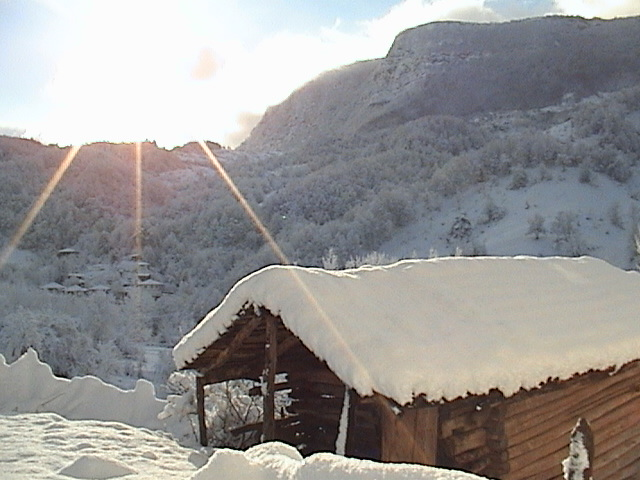
Derebucağı Köy'ünde 25.01.2005

Derebucağı is a village in the Cide District of Kastamonu Province in Turkey. Its population is 124 (2021).
