= Nanepınarı, Cide =

Village in Turkey

Nanepınarı
- Village
- Location in Turkey
- Coordinates: 41°50′12″N 32°49′16″E
- Country: Turkey
- Province: Kastamonu
- District: Cide
- Population (2021): 98
- Time zone: UTC+3 (TRT)

Nanepınarı is a village in the Cide District of Kastamonu Province in Turkey. Its population is 98 (2021).
