= Selman, Eğil =

Village in Turkey

Selman
- Neighbourhood
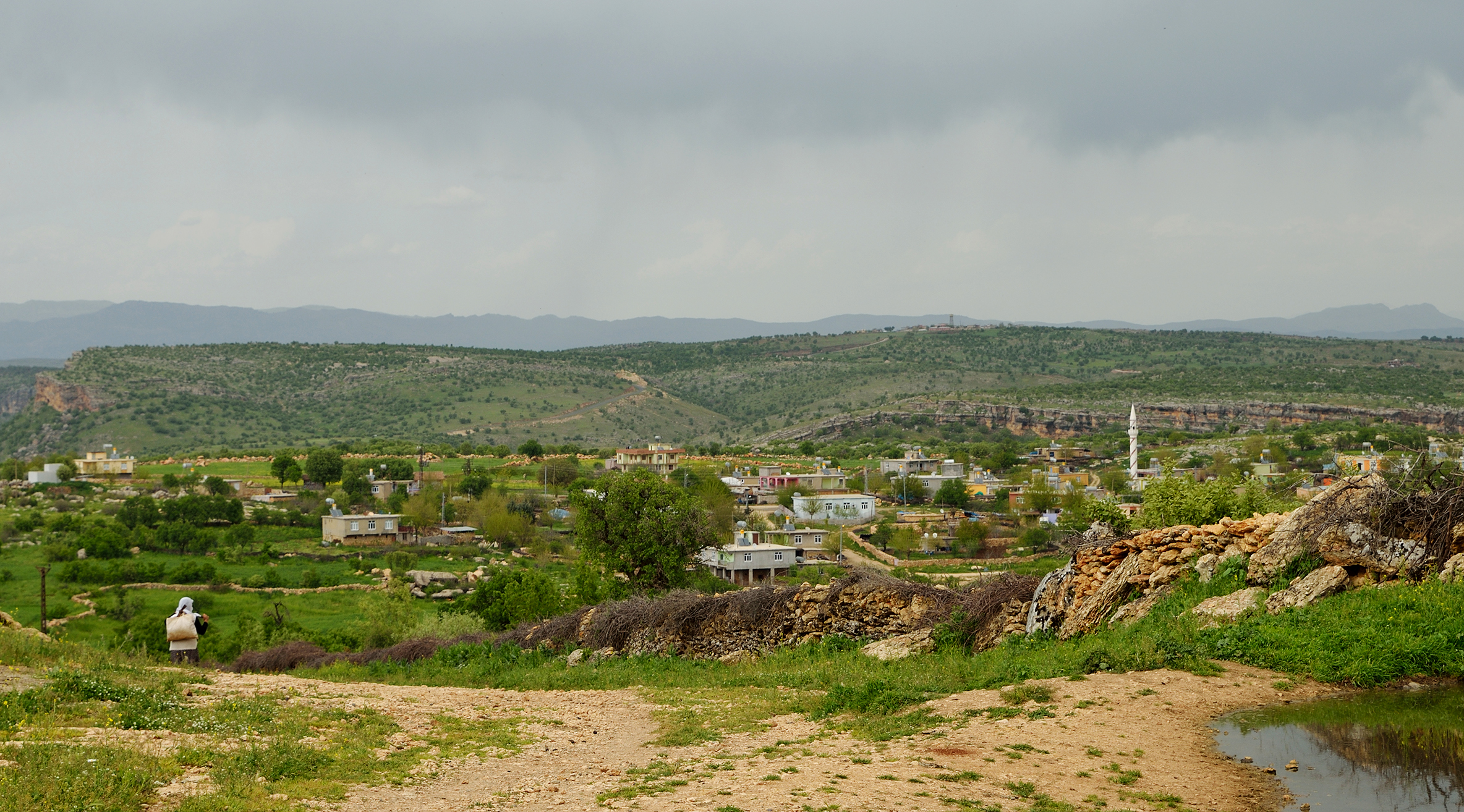

- Location within Turkey
- Coordinates: 38°11′53″N 40°10′04″E
- Country: Turkey
- Province: Diyarbakır
- District: Eğil
- Population (2022): 261
- Time zone: UTC+3 (TRT)

Selman is a neighbourhood in the municipality and district of Eğil, Diyarbakır Province in Turkey. It is populated by Kurds and had a population of 261 in 2022.
