= Kayaköyü, Eğil =

Village in Turkey

Kayaköyü
- Neighbourhood
- Location in Turkey
- Coordinates: 38°09′N 40°12′E
- Country: Turkey
- Province: Diyarbakır
- District: Eğil
- Population (2022): 1,349
- Time zone: UTC+3 (TRT)

Kayaköyü (Kurdish: Eyntirti) is a neighbourhood in the municipality and district of Eğil, Diyarbakır Province in Turkey. It is populated by Kurds and had a population of 1,349 in 2022.
