= Gündoğan, Cide =

Village in Turkey

Gündoğan
- Village
- Location in Turkey
- Coordinates: 42°00′08″N 33°21′43″E
- Country: Turkey
- Province: Kastamonu
- District: Cide
- Population (2021): 194
- Time zone: UTC+3 (TRT)

Gündoğan is a village in the Cide District of Kastamonu Province in Turkey. Its population is 194 (2021).
