= Cide =

- Municipality
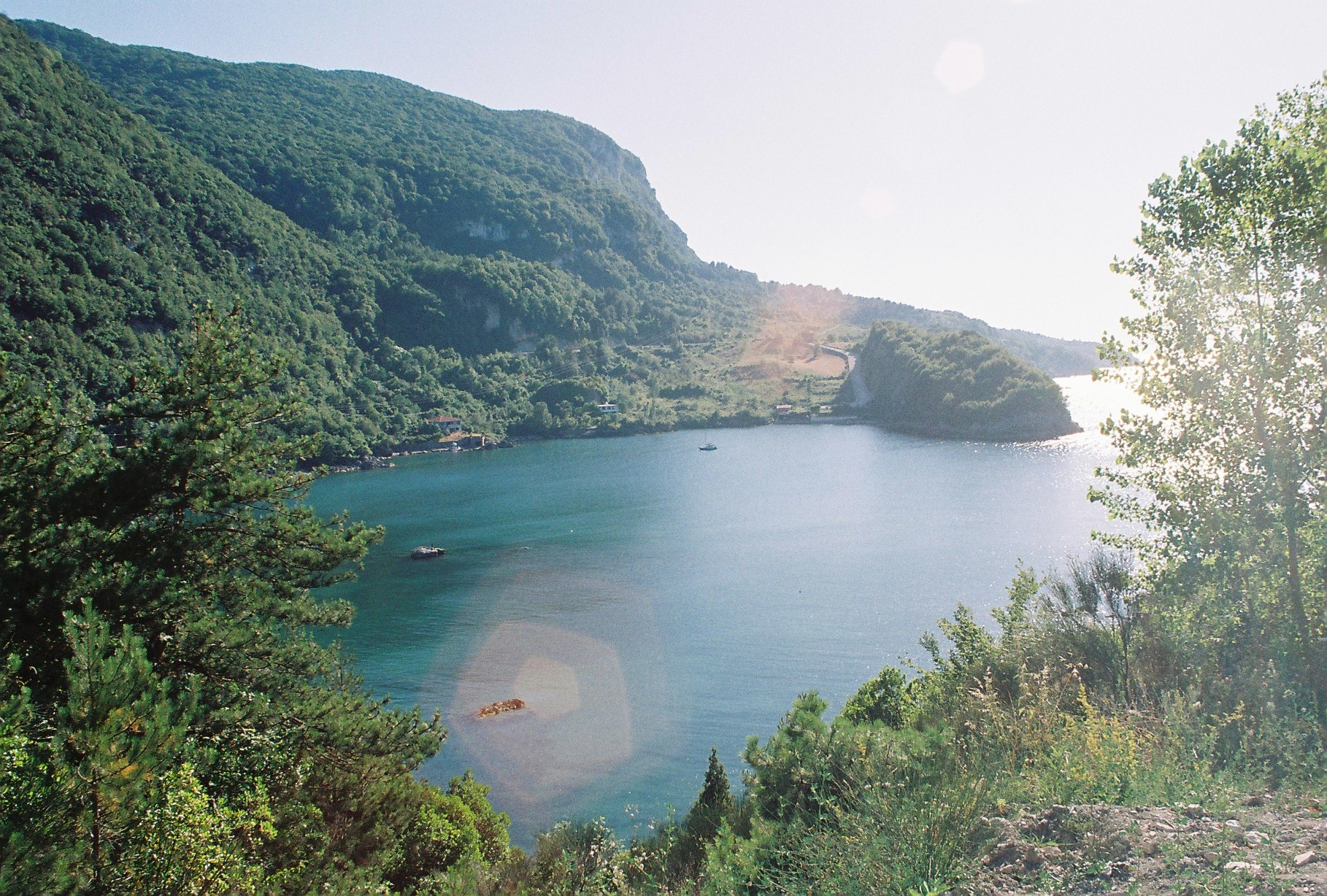
- Gideros bay, Cide

- Coat of arms

- Location within Turkey
- Coordinates: 41°53′32″N 33°00′16″E
- Country: Turkey
- Province: Kastamonu
- District: Cide

Government
  - Mayor: Nejdet Demir (MHP)
- Elevation: 20 m (66 ft)
- Population (2021): 11,087
- Time zone: UTC+3 (TRT)
- Postal code: 37600
- Area code: 0366
- Climate: Cfa
- Website: www.cide.bel.tr

Cide, also Karaağaç, is a town in the Kastamonu Province in the Black Sea region of Turkey. It is the seat of Cide District. Its population is 11,087 (2021). It lies near the Black Sea coast. The town consists of 16 quarters: Cumhuriyet, Ece, Kasaba, Kemerli, Nasuh, Memiş, Bağyurdu, Gebeş, Irmak, Kalafat, Kasımköy, Kırcı, Kumluca, Sipahi, Sofular and Tarakçı.

== History ==
In the late 19th and early 20th century, Cide was part of the Kastamonu Vilayet of the Ottoman Empire.

== Climate ==
Cide has a humid subtropical climate (Köppen: Cfa) with warm summers and cool, wet, occasionally snowy winters.

Climate data for Cide (1991–2020)
Month	Jan	Feb	Mar	Apr	May	Jun	Jul	Aug	Sep	Oct	Nov	Dec	Year
Mean daily maximum °C (°F)	9.9 (49.8)	10.2 (50.4)	12.3 (54.1)	15.6 (60.1)	19.4 (66.9)	24.0 (75.2)	26.5 (79.7)	26.9 (80.4)	23.7 (74.7)	19.9 (67.8)	15.8 (60.4)	12.1 (53.8)	18.1 (64.6)
Daily mean °C (°F)	6.5 (43.7)	6.4 (43.5)	8.2 (46.8)	11.5 (52.7)	15.6 (60.1)	20.2 (68.4)	22.7 (72.9)	23.0 (73.4)	19.6 (67.3)	15.9 (60.6)	11.8 (53.2)	8.6 (47.5)	14.2 (57.6)
Mean daily minimum °C (°F)	3.6 (38.5)	3.1 (37.6)	4.8 (40.6)	7.8 (46.0)	12.3 (54.1)	16.1 (61.0)	18.9 (66.0)	19.3 (66.7)	16.2 (61.2)	12.8 (55.0)	9.0 (48.2)	5.5 (41.9)	10.8 (51.4)
Average precipitation mm (inches)	112.88 (4.44)	87.37 (3.44)	88.01 (3.46)	52.27 (2.06)	54.09 (2.13)	71.93 (2.83)	65.21 (2.57)	86.01 (3.39)	115.75 (4.56)	164.53 (6.48)	138.79 (5.46)	148.44 (5.84)	1,185.28 (46.66)
Average precipitation days (≥ 1.0 mm)	12.3	10.7	11.0	7.5	7.0	6.5	4.8	5.0	8.1	9.4	9.5	12.7	104.5
Source: NOAA

== Image gallery ==
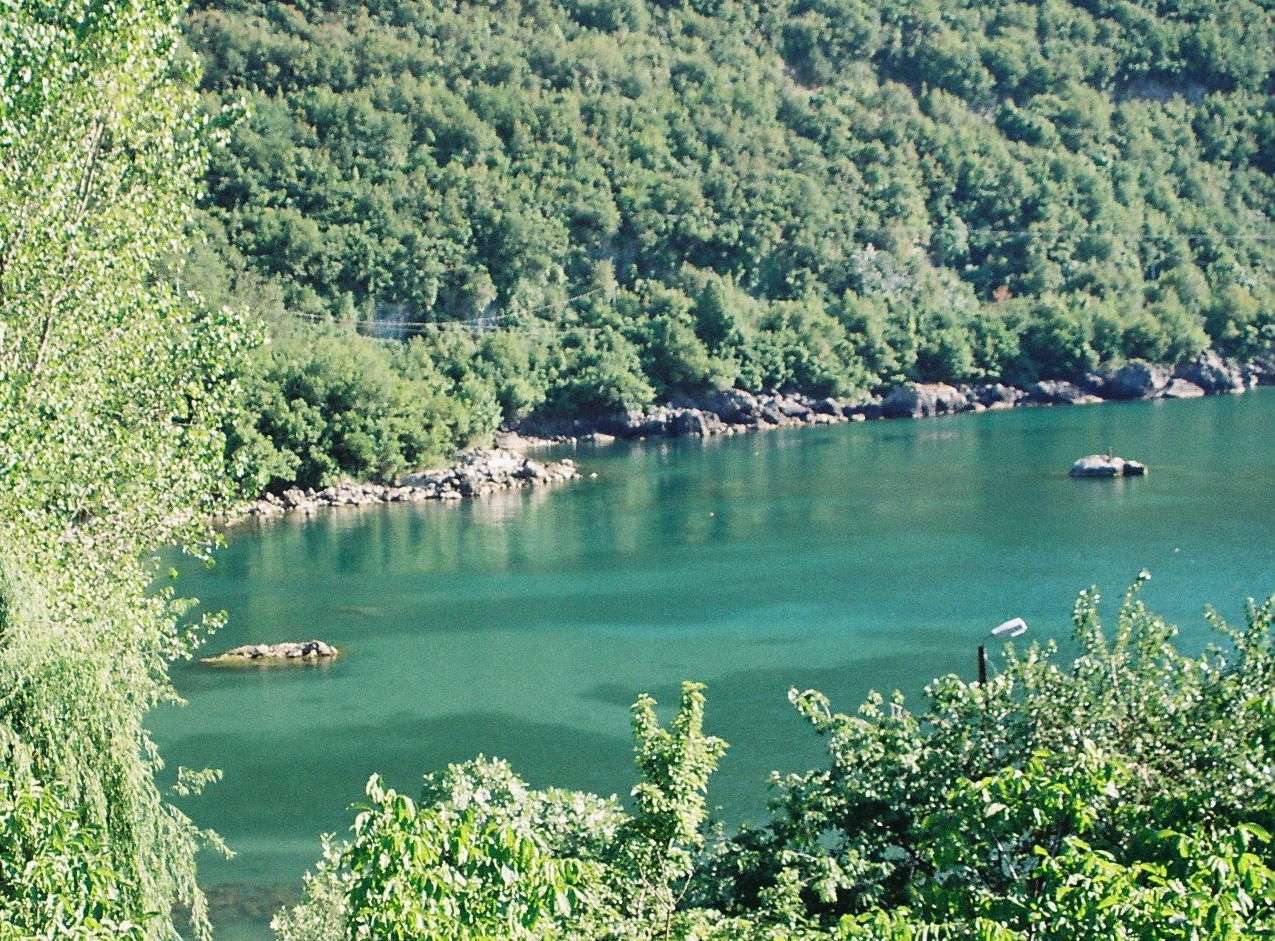
Gideros bay, Cide

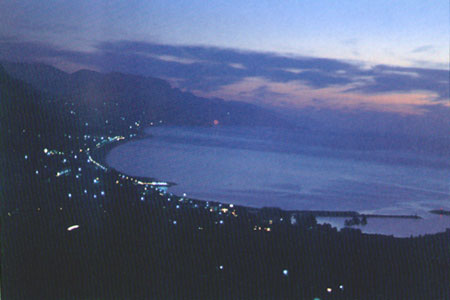
A panorama of Cide by night

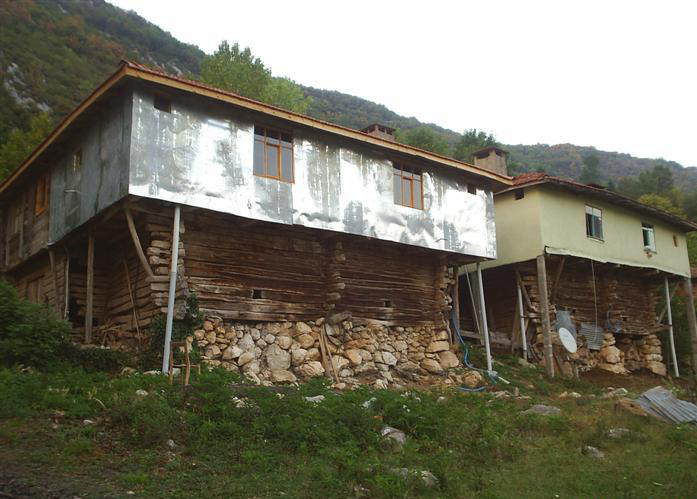
Old Cide houses
