= Kethüda, Cide =

Village in Turkey

Kethüda
- Village
- Location in Turkey
- Coordinates: 41.794°N 32.901°E
- Country: Turkey
- Province: Kastamonu
- District: Cide
- Population (2021): 134
- Time zone: UTC+3 (TRT)

Kethüda is a village in the Cide District of Kastamonu Province in Turkey. Its population is 134 (2021).
