= Sağlam, Eğil =

Village in Turkey

Sağlam
- Neighbourhood
- Location in Turkey
- Coordinates: 38°16′N 40°08′E
- Country: Turkey
- Province: Diyarbakır
- District: Eğil
- Population (2022): 471
- Time zone: UTC+3 (TRT)

Sağlam (Kurdish: Metînan) is a neighbourhood in the municipality and district of Eğil, Diyarbakır Province in Turkey. It is populated by Kurds and had a population of 471 in 2022.
