= Olucak, Cide =

Village in Turkey

Olucak
- Village
- Location in Turkey
- Coordinates: 41.844°N 32.949°E
- Country: Turkey
- Province: Kastamonu
- District: Cide
- Population (2021): 67
- Time zone: UTC+3 (TRT)

Olucak is a village in the Cide District of Kastamonu Province in Turkey. Its population is 67 as of 2021.
