= Kazanlı, Cide =

Village in Turkey

Kazanlı
- Village
- Location in Turkey
- Coordinates: 41.760°N 32.894°E
- Country: Turkey
- Province: Kastamonu
- District: Cide
- Population (2021): 128
- Time zone: UTC+3 (TRT)

Kazanlı is a village in the Cide District of Kastamonu Province in Turkey. Its population is 128 (2021).
