= Kuşçu, Cide =

Village in Turkey

Kuşçu
- Village
- Location in Turkey
- Coordinates: 41.932°N 33.078°E
- Country: Turkey
- Province: Kastamonu
- District: Cide
- Population (2021): 142
- Time zone: UTC+3 (TRT)

Kuşçu is a village in the Cide District of Kastamonu Province in Turkey. Its population is 142 (2021).
