= Piotr Ćwielong =

Polish footballer (born 1986)

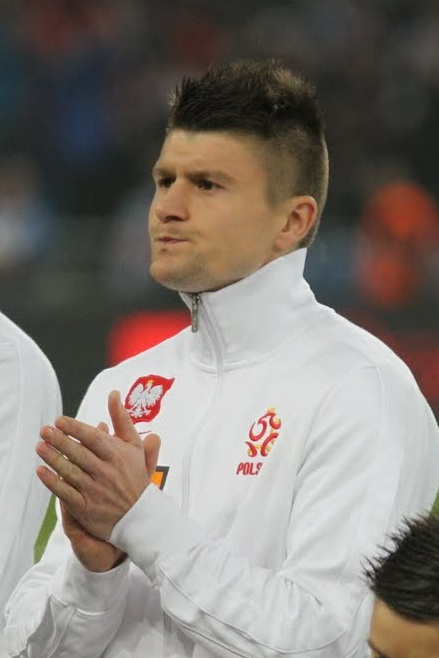
- Ćwielong with Poland in 2013

Personal information
- Full name: Piotr Ćwielong
- Date of birth: 23 April 1986 (age 40)
- Place of birth: Chorzów, Poland
- Height: 1.71 m (5 ft 7 in)
- Positions: Forward; winger

Team information
- Current team: LKS Pogórze
- Number: 23

Youth career
- 1993–1997: Ruch Chorzów
- 1997–2003: Stadion Śląski Chorzów

Senior career*
Years	Team	Apps	(Gls)
2004–2007	Ruch Chorzów	111	(29)
2007–2010	Wisła Kraków	36	(4)
2008	→ Ruch Chorzów (loan)	25	(4)
2010–2013	Śląsk Wrocław	82	(12)
2013–2016	VfL Bochum	39	(1)
2014	VfL Bochum II	3	(3)
2016–2017	Ruch Chorzów	20	(5)
2017	1. FC Magdeburg	5	(1)
2017–2019	GKS Tychy	20	(4)
2019–2022	LKS Goczałkowice-Zdrój	71	(38)
2022–2023	Clearex Chorzów (futsal)	11	(0)
2023–	LKS Pogórze	44	(33)

International career
2004	Poland U18	4	(1)
2004	Poland U19	5	(1)
2007–2008	Poland U21	11	(2)
2009–2010	Poland U23	4	(0)
2013	Poland	1	(0)
- * Club domestic league appearances and goals as of 09:58, 19 June 2025 (UTC)

Piotr Ćwielong (born 23 April 1986) is a Polish footballer and futsal player who plays as a forward or winger for regional league club LKS Pogórze.

== Career ==
Ćwielong was born in Chorzów. At the age of seven he started playing for Ruch Chorzów. Four years later he moved to Stadion Śląski Chorzów – a club known for developing young players. In 2004, he returned to Ruch Chorzów where he played 132 matches and scored 32 goals. Ćwielong scored his first goal for his new team against Pogoń Szczecin at the age of 18.

== Career statistics ==
As of match played 13 June 2026

Appearances and goals by club, season and competition
Club	Season	League			National cup (Note: Includes Polish Cup, DFB-Pokal)		League cup		Continental		Other		Total	
Club	Season	Division	Apps	Goals	Apps	Goals	Apps	Goals	Apps	Goals	Apps	Goals	Apps	Goals
Ruch Chorzów	2003–04	II liga	14	3	0	0	—		—		2 (Note: Appearances in II liga promotion/relegation play-offs)	1	16	4
Ruch Chorzów	2004–05	II liga	31	8	1	0	—		—		2	0	34	8
Ruch Chorzów	2005–06	II liga	31	8	1	0	—		—		—		32	8
Ruch Chorzów	2006–07	II liga	31	9	3	1	—		—		—		34	10
Ruch Chorzów	Total		107	28	5	1	—		—		4	1	116	30
Wisła Kraków	2007–08	Ekstraklasa	6	0	0	0	6	0	—		—		12	0
Wisła Kraków	2008–09	Ekstraklasa	13	2	2	0	—		0	0	0	0	15	2
Wisła Kraków	2009–10	Ekstraklasa	17	2	2	2	—		2 (Note: Appearances in UEFA Champions League)	1	1 (Note: Appearance in Polish Super Cup)	0	22	5
Wisła Kraków	Total		36	4	4	2	6	0	2	1	1	0	49	7
Ruch Chorzów (loan)	2007–08	Ekstraklasa	11	4	2	0	0	0	—		—		13	4
Ruch Chorzów (loan)	2008–09	Ekstraklasa	14	0	2	1	5	1	—		—		21	2
Ruch Chorzów (loan)	Total		25	4	4	1	5	1	—		—		34	6
Śląsk Wrocław	2009–10	Ekstraklasa	12	0	0	0	—		—		—		12	0
Śląsk Wrocław	2010–11	Ekstraklasa	26	3	0	0	—		—		—		26	3
Śląsk Wrocław	2011–12	Ekstraklasa	16	1	3	0	—		3 (Note: Appearances in UEFA Europa League)	0	—		22	1
Śląsk Wrocław	2012–13	Ekstraklasa	28	8	7	1	—		0	0	0	0	35	9
Śląsk Wrocław	Total		82	12	10	1	—		3	0	0	0	95	13
VfL Bochum	2013–14	2. Bundesliga	30	1	2	2	—		—		—		32	3
VfL Bochum	2014–15	2. Bundesliga	6	0	0	0	—		—		—		6	0
VfL Bochum	2015–16	2. Bundesliga	3	0	0	0	—		—		—		3	0
VfL Bochum	Total		39	1	2	2	—		—		—		41	3
VfL Bochum II	2014–15	Regionalliga West	3	3	—		—		—		—		3	3
Ruch Chorzów	2016–17	Ekstraklasa	20	5	1	0	—		—		—		21	5
1. FC Magdeburg	2016–17	3. Liga	5	1	0	0	—		—		—		5	1
GKS Tychy	2017–18	I liga	20	4	3	0	—		—		—		23	4
LKS Goczałkowice-Zdrój	2019–20	IV liga Silesia II	9	6	—		—		—		1 (Note: Appearance in IV liga Silesia promotion play-offs)	2	10	8
LKS Goczałkowice-Zdrój	2020–21	III liga, gr. III	34	19	—		—		—		—		34	19
LKS Goczałkowice-Zdrój	2021–22	III liga, gr. III	27	11	—		—		—		—		27	11
LKS Goczałkowice-Zdrój	Total		70	36	—		—		—		1	2	71	38
LKS Pogórze	2022–23	Reg. league Sil. VI	4	4	—		—		—		—		4	4
LKS Pogórze	2023–24	Klasa A Skoczów	9	7	—		—		—		—		9	7
LKS Pogórze	2024–25	Reg. league Sil. VI	17	15	—		—		—		—		17	15
LKS Pogórze	2025–26	Reg. league Sil. VI	14	7	—		—		—		—		14	7
LKS Pogórze	Total		44	33	—		—		—		—		44	33
Career total			451	131	29	7	11	1	5	1	6	3	502	143

== Honours ==
Ruch Chorzów

- II liga: 2006–07

Wisła Kraków

- Ekstraklasa: 2008–09

Śląsk Wrocław

- Ekstraklasa: 2011–12

LKS Goczałkowice-Zdrój

- IV liga Silesia II: 2019–20
