= Kazanlı, Eğil =

Village in Turkey

Kazanlı
- Neighbourhood
- Location in Turkey
- Coordinates: 38°14′19″N 40°09′35″E
- Country: Turkey
- Province: Diyarbakır
- District: Eğil
- Population (2022): 542
- Time zone: UTC+3 (TRT)

Kazanlı (Kurdish: Qasan) s a neighbourhood in the municipality and district of Eğil, Diyarbakır Province in Turkey. It is populated by Kurds and had a population of 542 in 2022.
