= Oyalı, Eğil =

Village in Turkey

Oyalı
- Neighbourhood
- Location in Turkey
- Coordinates: 38°8′8″N 40°2′16″E
- Country: Turkey
- Province: Diyarbakır
- District: Eğil
- Population (2022): 591
- Time zone: UTC+3 (TRT)

Oyalı (Kurdish: Satiyan) is a neighbourhood in the municipality and district of Eğil, Diyarbakır Province in Turkey. It is populated by Kurds and had a population of 591 in 2022.
