= Kumköy, Cide =

Village in Turkey

Kumköy
- Village
- Location in Turkey
- Coordinates: 41.885°N 33.115°E
- Country: Turkey
- Province: Kastamonu
- District: Cide
- Population (2021): 161
- Time zone: UTC+3 (TRT)

Kumköy is a village in the Cide District of Kastamonu Province in Turkey. Its population is 161 (2021).
