= Ahmet Sağlam =

Turkish footballer

Personal information
- Full name: Ahmet Sağlam
- Date of birth: 9 May 1987 (age 39)
- Place of birth: Bonn, West Germany
- Height: 1.87 m (6 ft 2 in)
- Position: Centre back

Youth career
- Boluspor Bonn
- Bonner SC
- Alemannia Aachen
- VfL Leverkusen

Senior career*
Years	Team	Apps	(Gls)
2006–2007	Beylerbeyi	22	(2)
2007–2008	Eyüpspor	23	(1)
2008–2009	Eskişehirspor	8	(0)
2009–2010	→ Göztepe (loan)	7	(0)
2010–2013	Göztepe	24	(2)
2011–2012	→ Turgutluspor (loan)	25	(5)
2013–2014	Kırklarelispor	28	(2)
2014–2015	Fethiyespor	17	(0)
2015	Tavşanlı Linyitspor	9	(0)
2015–2017	TuS Erndtebrück	52	(4)
2017–2019	VfB Oldenburg	42	(7)
2019	SV Straelen	0	(0)
- * Club domestic league appearances and goals

Ahmet Sağlam (born 9 May 1987), is a Turkish football player currently playing for VfB Oldenburg as a defender.

He previously played for Beylerbeyi, Eyüpspor and Eskişehirspor. Sağlam appeared in five Süper Lig matches during 2008-09 season with Eskişehirspor.

== Career ==
=== SV Straelen ===
In the summer 2019, Sağlam left VfB Oldenburg to join SV Straelen. A few days into his new adventure, he picked up a tibia shaft fracture injury and was never able to play for the club, before the contract was terminated at the end of the year.
