= Cide District =

District of Kastamonu Province, Turkey

- District
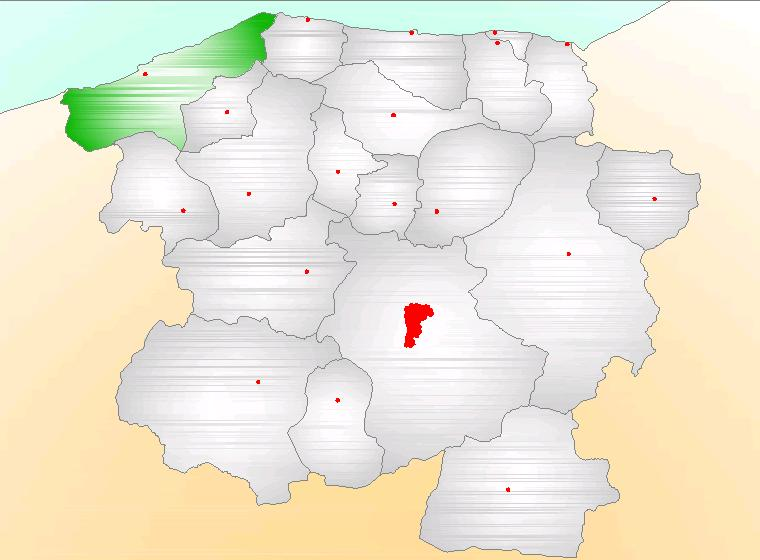
- Map showing Cide District (green) in Kastamonu Province

- Location in Turkey
- Coordinates: 41°53′N 33°02′E
- Country: Turkey
- Province: Kastamonu
- Seat: Cide

Government
  - Kaymakam: Tuncay Karataş
- Area: 652 km^{2} (252 sq mi)
- Population (2021): 22,136
  - Density: 34/km^{2} (88/sq mi)
- Time zone: UTC+3 (TRT)
- Website: www.cide.gov.tr

Cide District is a district of the Kastamonu Province of Turkey. Its seat is the town of Cide. Its area is 652 km^{2}, and its population is 22,136 (2021).

== Composition ==
There is one municipality in Cide District:

- Cide

There are 75 villages in Cide District:

- Abdülkadir
- Ağaçbükü
- Akbayır
- Akça
- Alayazı
- Alayüz
- Aydıncık
- Baltacı
- Başköy
- Beltepe
- Beşevler
- Çakırlı
- Çamaltı
- Çamdibi
- Çataloluk
- Çayüstü
- Çayyaka
- Çilekçe
- Çukurçal
- Denizkonak
- Derebağ
- Derebucağı
- Doğankaya
- Döngelce
- Düzköy
- Emirler
- Gökçeler
- Gökçeören
- Gündoğan
- Günebakan
- Güzelyayla
- Hacıahmet
- Hamitli
- Himmetbeşe
- İlyasbey
- İsaköy
- İshakça
- Kapısuyu
- Karakadı
- Kayaardı
- Kazanlı
- Kethüda
- Kezağzı
- Kıranlıkoz
- Koçlar
- Konuklar
- Köseli
- Kovanören
- Kumköy
- Kuşçu
- Kuşkayası
- Mencekli
- Menük
- Musaköy
- Nanepınarı
- Okçular
- Olucak
- Ortaca
- Ovacık
- Öveçler
- Pehlivanlı
- Sakallı
- Şenköy
- Sırakaya
- Soğucak
- Toygarlı
- Üçağıl
- Uğurlu
- Velioğlu
- Yalçınköy
- Yaylaköy
- Yenice
- Yeniköy
- Yıldızalan
- Yurtbaşı
