= Al Ukhaydir =

Al-Ukhaydir could refer to the following places:

- Al-Ukhaidir Fortress, a fortress in the Karbala Governorate, Iraq
- Al-Ukhaydir, Makkah Province, a village in Makkah Province, Saudi Arabia
- Al-Ukhaydir, Tabuk Province, a fort in Tabuk Province, Saudi Arabia
