= Battlefield 1 =

2016 first-person shooter video game

- Developer: DICE (Note: Additional work by Criterion Games and DICE Los Angeles)
- Publisher: Electronic Arts
- Director: Stefan Strandberg
- Producers: Aleksander Svendsen Grøndal; Andreas Morell; Jamie Keen
- Designers: Lars Gustavsson; Eric Holmes
- Programmer: Vidar Nygren
- Artist: Gustav Tilleby
- Writers: Christofer Emgård; Mikael Säker; Steven Hall
- Composers: Patrik Andrén; Johan Söderqvist
- Series: Battlefield
- Engine: Frostbite 3
- Platforms: PlayStation 4; Microsoft Windows; Xbox One
- Release: October 21, 2016
- Genre: First-person shooter
- Modes: Single-player, multiplayer

Battlefield 1 is a 2016 first-person shooter game developed by DICE and published by Electronic Arts. It is the fifteenth installment in the Battlefield series. It was released for PlayStation 4, Microsoft Windows, and Xbox One in October 2016.

Battlefield 1 marked a departure for the series by setting the game in World War I. Its single-player mode, titled War Stories, explores the experiences of various soldiers across different theaters of the war, including the Western Front, the Italian Front, Gallipoli, and Arabia. Additionally, the game offers multiplayer gameplay marked by large-scale ground battles and intense aerial dogfights.

Battlefield 1 received positive reviews from critics, who saw it as an improvement over the series' previous installments, Battlefield 4 and Battlefield Hardline. Most of the praise was directed towards its WWI setting, single-player campaigns, and multiplayer modes. The game was a commercial success, with estimated sales of over 15 million copies, and was followed by Battlefield V in 2018.

== Gameplay ==
Similar to its predecessors, Battlefield 1 is a first-person shooter game that emphasizes teamwork. It is set in the period of World War I, and is inspired by historical events. Players can make use of World War I weapons, including bolt-action rifles, submachine guns, automatic and semi-automatic rifles, artillery, flamethrowers, and poison gas to combat opponents. Melee combat was reworked, with DICE introducing new melee weapons such as sabres, trench clubs, and shovels into the game. These melee weapons were divided into three groups: heavy, medium and light. Players can also take control of various armored vehicles, including light tanks, landships, heavy tanks, armored cars, cars, torpedo boats, bi- and tri-plane aircraft, armored trains, reconnaissance vehicles, dreadnoughts, M-class zeppelins, as well as ride horses to use in battle. Destructible environments and weapon customization, features present in the previous games, returned in Battlefield 1 and are more dynamic.

The game's world designer, Daniel Berlin, said the campaign mode has larger and more open environments than those in previous installments in the franchise, with more options and choices in terms of paths to completing levels and how to approach combat. Players can control several characters in the campaign. If the player dies in the prologue, they will then take control of another soldier and role instead of reloading from a checkpoint. These roles can range from tank gunner to rifleman. Unlike its predecessors, the game features a collection of war stories, similar to an anthology.

The game's multiplayer mode supports up to 64 players. The new squad system allows a group of players to enter and leave game servers together. According to Berlin, playing without joining a squad would make gameplay significantly more difficult. Multiplayer maps are based on several fronts of WWI around the world, including the Middle East, the Western Front, Gallipoli, and the Alps. Further expansions introduced the Eastern Front and Russian Civil War, as well as naval battles in the North Sea. The game launched with nine maps and six modes, which include Conquest, Domination, Operations, Rush, Team Deathmatch, and War Pigeons, a mode in which players must secure war pigeons and use them to call for an artillery strike.

=== Multiplayer modes ===
Battlefield 1's multiplayer mode features numerous game types seen in previous entries in the franchise, as well as new modes;

- Conquest: One of the standard game modes in the Battlefield series. Teams capture objectives across the map, earning points based on the number of objectives they hold and eliminations they get. If a team is suffering from a major point deficit, a Behemoth-class vehicle (such as a Zeppelin L 30, an armoured train, a Dreadnought, or a Char 2C) becomes available for their use.
- Conquest Assault: similar to Conquest but one team starts with all objectives captured, and the other must take over all the objectives to win or surpass the number of points that the defending team has.
- Domination: a version of Conquest with a smaller map, no vehicles and only 3 control points.
- Rush: another standard game mode in the series, played between a defending and attacking team. An attacking team with a limited number of respawns must attempt to plant bombs in two telegraph stations located within a sector of the map, while the defending team must protect the stations and defuse planted bombs before they explode. If the attackers are successful, their respawns are replenished and the defending team falls back to the next sector. The game ends if the defending team exhausts the attackers' respawn tickets, or the attacking team captures the final telegraph stations. Unlike Rush modes in previous Battlefield games, the telegraph stations can also be used to call for artillery fire against the attackers.
- Operations: A new mode which takes place across multiple maps to simulate a campaign from the war. An attacking team controls a battalion with limited respawn tickets; similarly to Rush, they must progress across sectors of a map by capturing their control points. If the attacking team exhausts their tickets, they lose one of their three battalions, and must try again. If the attackers are successful, the teams move onto a different map. The attacking team wins if they successfully clear all maps without running out of battalions, while the defenders win if they eliminate all three of their opponents' battalions. The attacking team can be granted a Behemoth vehicle if they lose a battalion. Conversely, if the defending team lost all sectors in a map without costing the attacking team one battalion, they will be granted a behemoth to even the odds on the start of the next map in the operation campaign.
- Team Deathmatch: a standard game in which teams compete to reach a target number of kills, or the highest number of kills before time expires.
- War Pigeons: a new, capture the flag-like mode in which two teams must attempt to capture a messenger pigeon used to signal artillery fire. After the pigeon is captured, the player must be defended while they prepare the message to be sent, and the pigeon must be released outside. However, the opposing team can still shoot down the pigeon. The first team to successfully release 3 pigeons wins the game.
- Frontlines: A new mode added in the They Shall Not Pass DLC, described as a "tug of war" combining aspects of Operations and Rush. A map contains five control points along a linear path connecting the bases of the two teams. Beginning at the centre of the map, a team must progress towards their opponents' base by capturing each successive control point. If the point is captured by the opposing team instead, they are pushed back towards their own territory. If a team reaches their opponent's base, they must then destroy the two telegraph stations within to win the game. As in Rush, the defending team can use the telegraph stations to call for artillery fire. If the attacking team does not destroy both stations before they run out of tickets, they are pushed out and must capture the final objective again before they can make another attempt.
- Supply Drop: A new mode was added in the "In the Name of the Tsar" DLC, inspired by the vast areas of the Eastern Front in World War 1. In this game mode, teams fight over supply drops that provide various resources, including ammo, health, vehicles, and pickups for Elite classes. The team that captures more points wins. While ammo and health are more commonly found in the supply drops, vehicles and Elite class pickups are designed to give the attacking team an advantage, potentially turning the tide of battle.
- Air Assault: The newest multiplayer game mode, added as part of the Apocalypse DLC. This game mode, only available on two maps, features "frantic dogfights" and centers on aerial combat. Each opposing vehicle destroyed gains your team points. On the map "Razor's Edge", only single-seat planes are available, while in "London Calling", a wide variety of planes—and a zeppelin—are at each team's disposal.
- Shock Operations: A new mode added in the 2018 June Patch. Shock Operations are like Operations but instead these are shorter, faster with 40 players per server unlike normal 64 players per server and only play on one map. There are only five available maps in this game mode. These maps are called Giant's Shadow, Prise de Tahure, Lupkow Pass, Zeebrugge and River Somme.
- Back to Basic: A game mode in which you can only use standard-issue rifles as main weapon, all other weapon classes are disabled. The vehicles and elite kits are also unavailable.

=== Classes ===
Battlefield 1's multiplayer features four main classes, three spawn-based vehicle classes, and five pick-up based Elite classes:

Infantry-based:

- Assault: The primary CQB/anti-vehicle class. Assault players have submachine guns, machine pistols, and shotguns at their disposal. They contribute using explosives such as dynamite or anti-tank grenades to destroy vehicles such as tanks and armored vehicles. Their AA Rocket guns deal considerable damage to aircraft.
- Medic: The Medic class is primarily focused on reviving teammates and healing them. The primary weapons in this class area are semi-automatic rifles, and some fully automatic rifles. One semi-automatic rifle can also be used in bolt-action mode.
- Support: Support troops have access to light-machine guns and semi-automatic carbines. In addition they have access to smaller explosive devices, such as mortars, limpet charges and crossbows which launch grenades. They also contribute to the team by replenishing their teammates' ammo and repairing stationary weapons and vehicles.
- Scout: Scouts use a variety of bolt-action and lever-action service rifles. The unique contribution to the team of the scout class is spotting enemies either by firing a flare gun, which spots nearby enemies in the vicinity of the flare on all teammates' mini-map, or by using a periscope, which makes spotted enemies' whole silhouette visible even through walls ("3D spotting").

Vehicle-based:

- Tanker: Players choosing to spawn into a tank automatically spawn as the tanker class. The class is new to the series, and features a hammer wrench that can repair allied vehicles and damage enemy vehicles, in addition to self-repairings.
- Pilot: Players who spawn into a plane automatically spawn as the pilot class. Outside of tanks and planes, tankers and pilots have access to pistol carbines and a sawed-off shotgun.
- Cavalry: Players who choose to spawn on a horse spawn as the cavalry class. The cavalry class is equipped with a cuirass granting them extra defense, a Russian 1895 cavalry rifle, a cavalry saber or a cavalry lance as well as the ability to replenish health and ammo to both themselves, their horse and their teammates through the use of medical packs and ammunition packs.

Elite Classes:

- Flame Trooper Kit: Players who pick up the Flame Trooper Kit automatically equip a Gas mask, a Wex flamethrower, and three Incendiary grenades. They are also equipped with a trench club.
- Sentry Kit: Players who pick up the Sentry Kit gain plate armour and a MG 08/15 or Villar Perosa, as well one Frag grenade and a trench club. The plate armour includes a helmet which prevents headshots to the player, but leaves them unable to don a gas mask.
- Tank Hunter Kit: Players who pick up the Tank Hunter Kit equip both a Mauser 1918 T-Gewehr, capable of doing massive amounts of damage to vehicles and infantry, and a sawed-off shotgun. They also gain access to a periscope and Geballteladung anti-tank grenades. Furthermore, the player dons a respirator and goggles, granting them a permanent Gas Mask, while being able to aim down their sights without obscured vision. Their armor remains the same as that of a normal soldier.
- Trench Raider Kit: Players who pick up the Trench Raider Kit wield a Trench Club that kills enemies in one hit, Smoke Grenades, a Medical crate, and a No. 3 Revolver, and three Frag grenades. This kit is exclusive to the They Shall Not Pass expansion.
- Infiltrator Kit: Players who pick up this kit receive a Martini-Henry Grenade Launcher, a sawed-off shotgun, a spawn beacon in the form of a heliograph, and a signal flare gun that calls in artillery strikes. As with the Sentry, the player is unable to don a gas mask. This elite class is exclusive to the Turning Tides expansion.

== Campaigns ==
=== Characters ===
During the single-player campaigns, the player controls six different characters from a first-person perspective over six different chapters (known as War Stories). Unlike previous campaigns in the series, Battlefield 1's single-player story mode is composed of six separate "War Stories", each shown through the eyes of separate Allied soldiers from different nationalities:

- "Storm of Steel" – the prologue of the game, set in the Western Front through the eyes of several American Harlem Hellfighters
- "Through Mud and Blood" – set in the Battle of Cambrai through the eyes of a British tank driver
- "Friends in High Places" – set in France and the UK and seen through the eyes of a Royal Flying Corps fighter pilot
- "Avanti Savoia" – set in the Italian Alps and seen through the eyes of a mournful survivor and member of the Arditi
- "The Runner" – taking place on the Gallipoli Peninsula (part of the Ottoman Empire) through the eyes of an ANZAC runner
- "Nothing is Written" – set in the Arabian Desert through the eyes of a Bedouin warrior under the command of Lawrence of Arabia

=== Plots ===
==== Storm of Steel ====
The prologue, set in 1918, sees players take control of different members of the Harlem Hellfighters as they defend their positions against a German offensive in France during the Second Battle of the Marne. The player initially starts out near the front line and must survive as long as possible against waves of German soldiers. If the player survives the attack, an artillery barrage will rain down on them and then the game's perspective will shift to another soldier, who is manning a Vickers machine gun. The position is bombarded by an airship, forcing the soldier to abandon the weapon and defend the church in which it was located. During the course of the gameplay, an unnamed narrator (one of the Hellfighters) gives commentary on the nature of the war as the battle continues and player-controlled soldiers are killed.

The Hellfighters initially lose ground to the Germans, but British tanks force the German troops into a retreat until the tanks are stalled by German artillery. The Hellfighters mount a counterattack and push forward, sustaining casualties as the Germans hold their ground. When the player switches perspective to the final soldier in the gameplay, a German soldier attempts to kill the player character with a shovel but is stopped short by an artillery barrage that wipes out all of the combatants on the battlefield and renders the player unconscious. When the player character regains consciousness, he initially appears to be the lone survivor but quickly encounters a German survivor. Although the two point their weapons at one another, exhaustion and battle fatigue set in as both realize the futility of their situation, inclining both men to lower their weapons. The game then proceeds to an introduction cinematic that opens up to the other War Stories.

==== Through Mud and Blood ====
Set in the autumn of 1918 during the Battle of Cambrai in the Hundred Days Offensive, players assume the role of Daniel Edwards, a former chauffeur who enlists in the war as a British tank driver. Edwards is assigned to a Mark V tank dubbed "Black Bess," and meets the rest of his crew: Townsend, the tank crew's commander; McManus, a cynical gunner who doubts Edwards' abilities and the likelihood of the crew's success; Pritchard, another gunner; and Finch, the friendly mechanic.

The crew must penetrate German lines to reach the French town of Cambrai and help capture strategic positions and destroy artillery batteries. Finch is killed by machine-gun fire early on while trying to repair the tank, and later on, the tank becomes trapped in mud and surrounded by German infantry. Townsend decides to summon an artillery strike on their own position with the tank's messenger pigeon to save the tank, which McManus objects to vehemently. Pritchard is shot and killed trying to release the pigeon, forcing Edwards to do so, which enables British artillery to save the tank. Encountering thick fog in the nearby Bourlon Wood, Edwards acts as a forward scout to guide the tank. Clearing the forest, the tank becomes beset with mechanical problems, and Townsend sends Edwards and McManus to salvage spark plugs from British tanks captured by the Germans. McManus expresses his disdain for their orders and abandons the mission, deserting. However, McManus has a change of heart later on and returns just in time to save Edwards from a German soldier.

With the tank repaired, the crew proceeds to a railway station defended by German forces. Although Bess is the only British tank in the area, the crew attacks the railway station to deceive the Germans into thinking that a large British offensive is underway. Eliminating the German forces at the railway station, the tank proceeds to Cambrai but is immobilized by artillery and attacked by German soldiers. Edwards and McManus are wounded defending the tank, and an injured Townsend sacrifices himself by igniting a gas leak inside the tank, killing himself and the Germans. With Bess destroyed and Edwards and McManus the only survivors, the two proceed alone on foot to Cambrai. Closing subtitles indicate that with the participation of more than 300 tanks at the Battle of Cambrai, the war ended a month later.

There has been criticism of this mission due to its historical inaccuracy and a missed opportunity to include a new nation to the game. It was the Canadian 2nd Division which entered Cambrai.

==== Friends in High Places ====
In this story, set in the spring of 1917 during the Battle of Arras players control Clyde Blackburn, an American pilot and gambler with a habit of deceitful behavior. Early on, Blackburn cheats George Rackham, a pilot of British nobility, in a game of cards and steals the latter's Bristol F.2. Posing as Rackham, Blackburn introduces himself to Rackham's gunner, Wilson, and the two set off on an aerial exercise. During the exercise, German aircraft ambush the duo, and the two pilots take photographs of a German munitions base they stumble upon after fighting off the enemy fighters. Although Wilson is reluctant to show the photos to British Command out of fears of being accused of insubordination, Blackburn cajoles him into doing so with the prospect of winning medals. Wilson agrees on the condition that Blackburn returns them both safe from future missions.

Blackburn and Wilson escort British bombers in an assault on the photographed German munitions base. Although the base is destroyed, Blackburn and Wilson are caught in a bomb explosion and crash behind enemy lines, separated. Blackburn sneaks through German positions and discovers Wilson is injured. Knowing that he will be unable to return to British lines safely while carrying Wilson, Blackburn contemplates putting his companion out of his misery but changes his mind when Wilson reveals he knew Blackburn's true identity all along. Blackburn carries Wilson through no-man's land to friendly lines but is detained by British Provosts under the orders of Rackham.

On the way to the court-martial in London, the vessel carrying Blackburn, Rackham, and Wilson is attacked by a German aerial raid, and Rackham is killed. Blackburn and Wilson commandeer a plane and fight off the German raid. Blackburn and Wilson first destroy a wave of German bombers and fighters before crashing into a German Zeppelin and using its anti-aircraft gun to destroy another Zeppelin. The two pilots jump into the River Thames after the Zeppelin plummets to the ground. The story ends with Blackburn climbing out of the river unharmed, reflecting on his experiences. He notes that mixed accounts of his exploits may arise due to the confusing nature of the war, but suggests that his version of events is the truth. The story ends on an ambiguous note by leaving the question open as to whether the events of the story truly occurred as they did.

==== Avanti Savoia! ====
Taking place during the autumn of 1918, on the Italian front during the Battle of Monte Grappa, in the Dolomites of Northern Italy, players assume the role of Luca Vincenzo Cocchiola, a member of the Arditi unit. The story is conveyed by an aged Luca years after the war as he recounts his memories to his American daughter on his birthday. He and his twin brother, Matteo, take part in a major offensive to seize an Austro-Hungarian fortress, days after their 21st birthday. While Matteo takes part in the main thrust of the offensive, Luca's unit plays an auxiliary role, eliminating barriers to the main advance forces. Donning heavy body armor and using a MG08/15 Luca spearheads the assault on key Austro-Hungarian positions, capturing strongpoints, destroying an artillery gun, and thwarting an enemy aerial assault.

In desperation to stop the assault on the fort, the Austro-Hungarian bombers trigger a landslide to obstruct the Italian offensive. Desperate to save his brother, Luca sets off alone into the battlefield to find his brother's unit, armed with a Villar Perosa and a Beretta M1915. Along the way, he assists trapped Italian units and pushes toward the direction of the enemy fort. After clearing the fortress, Luca finds the remains of his brother's unit and stumbles upon his deceased brother; much to his grief and dismay. A mourning Luca in the present-day bids his brother farewell and happy birthday, while a concluding subtitle states that the war affected both nation-states and empires, as well as families, with survivors and the deceased of the war named the "Lost Generation."

==== The Runner ====
Set during the Gallipoli Campaign of 1915, the player takes on the role of Australian messenger and Second Boer War veteran, Frederick Bishop. The story starts with Bishop encountering young Jack Foster, who says he is Bishop's new charge. While initially cynical, Bishop reluctantly relents and takes Foster under his wing, but warns Foster to refrain from battle due to his inexperience and young age. Bishop storms the beaches of Gallipoli at Cape Helles and captures a strategic enemy position. Bishop fires a flare to signify the capture of the position but is startled by a lone Foster, who disobeyed Bishop's command to only move up with the rest of the Allied forces. Bishop berates Foster for his naivety and view of war as a glorious activity, given that Foster had lied about his age to enlist. Foster becomes appalled at the sight of the carnage around him, but Bishop softens his rhetoric and reassures Foster that they will be alright.

The next day, Bishop volunteers as a runner in place of Foster, whom Bishop considers inexperienced for the task. Bishop returns to HQ to deliver a message and is saved by Foster, who shoots a nearby Ottoman soldier. British officer Whitehall dispatches Bishop to a rear command post to inform them that the British intend to advance further. Bishop finds the rear CP deserted, and discovers that the British intend to retreat and cover the withdrawal with artillery fire. Remembering that Foster is still on the frontlines, Bishop rushes back to retrieve him. Finding Whitehall, Bishop is shocked to discover that Foster has joined an assault on an Ottoman fortress. Bishop decides to pursue Foster, while a distressed Whitehall permits Bishop to disobey the fallback order to get Foster, telling him he has not much time.

Bishop finds Foster and informs him of the imminent artillery strike, but the young Australian says that they cannot abandon their wounded. Bishop attacks the fort to cover the withdrawal, but tells Foster to fire a flare when the retreat is completed so that the former can make his own escape. Bishop then single-handedly captures the fort and is mortally wounded in the process, but sees Foster's flare and is relieved to see that the retreat was successful. The story ends with Bishop watching as British warships shell the fort. Closing subtitles state that the Ottomans eventually won the Battle at Gallipoli, and several notable survivors went on to found a new postwar Republic of Turkey. Australian and New Zealand troops fought at Gallipoli under their own flags, distinguishing themselves in combat after marking the Anzac Day.

==== Nothing is Written ====
Al-Ajdar as shown on the Hejaz railway

Taking place in the spring of 1918, players assume control of Zara Ghufran, a Bedouin rebel working directly alongside British intelligence officer T. E. Lawrence (better known as Lawrence of Arabia) as they fight to undermine the Ottoman occupation of the Arabian Peninsula. Zara infiltrates a derailed Ottoman train in Al-Ajdar and retrieves a manual with Ottoman communication codes. Although caught in a trap by Tilkici, an Ottoman officer, Zara is rescued by Lawrence and several Bedouin insurgents. Zara and Lawrence decide to interrogate Tilkici on how to use the code manually to lure the Canavar, an Ottoman armored train, into a trap, but Tilkici scoffs that the rebels will not triumph.

Having interrogated Tilkici, the rebels discover that they must use message capsules held by three Ottoman officers to ask the train to stand down. Zara proceeds alone, successfully infiltrating Ottoman camps to release two message capsules by a pigeon while eliminating the Ottoman commanders. However, as she prepares to release the third capsule, she is knocked unconscious by Tilkici, who managed to escape from Lawrence. Tilkici drags Zara out into the desert and taunts her, having already ordered the Canavar to strike Lawrence's camp. However, Zara kills Tilkici before he can execute her.

Returning to Lawrence, who survived the attack by relocating following Tilkici's escape, Zara and Lawrence decide to attack the armored train while it stops for supplies. Zara infiltrates the village where the Canavar stops and destroys segments of the train to impede the train's movement. Zara and the rebels destroy the train in an intense battle, ending the threat to their forces. Having achieved her "revenge" against the Canavar, Zara joins Lawrence to strike at targets in the Suez Canal. The closing subtitles indicate that although the Ottomans driven from Arabia, the Allies refused to grant the Arabs full autonomy and that conflicts in the region continue into the 21st century.

== Development ==
According to game designer Daniel Berlin, the team picked World War I as the game's setting as they believed that the weapons and gadgets featured in that period of time suit players with different playstyles. The game was named Battlefield 1, since the team considered World War I as "the dawn of all-out warfare". Melee weapons were reworked so as to introduce more depth to the system. According to creative director Lars Gustavsson, the setting was a concept for a very long time, and it had been the "dream" for the team to create a game based on that period. According to Berlin, gameplay was the most important aspect when they were developing the game, and he promised that it would not be slowed down due to the game's historical setting. The story of the game is told through multiple protagonists, and explores the stories of unknown war heroes. Patrick Söderlund, the executive at Electronic Arts responsible for overseeing DICE, originally rejected the idea of having a World War One shooter as he thought that it would not be fun to play. He later accepted the pitch after being convinced by a demo created by DICE. Aleksander Grøndal, Senior Producer at DICE, prepared his own research into the war by looking at visual references. He favored colored images of the war in an attempt to visualize what the soldiers lived through. “I wanted to see the pictures and I wanted to imagine how they'd look with a mobile lens,” Grøndal expressed when interviewed. “I wanted to start off with all the footage and imagine that footage in our game with a modern take.” He specifically favored Apocalypse: World War I, a 2014 colorized French documentary, and World War I in Colour by Charles Messenger, a 2004 book of colorized war time photographs. Grøndal favored colored material as he felt, "It's quite interesting and it sucks you in because it feels much closer when you see everything in color." Despite his personal penchant for colored visuals, his self ascribed "big inspiration" was Blueprint for Armageddon, a six-part audio documentary by Dan Carlin for the latter's Hardcore History podcast series.

In June 2015, DICE revealed that they were working on an unannounced game. In January 2016, EA announced that Titanfall 2, Mass Effect: Andromeda and an unannounced video game set in the Battlefield universe would be released prior to the end of the company's fiscal year. Both the title, the game's release date, and the plot of the game were leaked prior to the official announcement on May 6, 2016. The game was officially unveiled on that day through a livestream on Twitch, showcasing a reveal trailer of the game featuring a remix of The White Stripes' "Seven Nation Army" by The Glitch Mob. The game's Collector's Edition includes items such as a statue of a Harlem Hellfighter, a code for exclusive downloadable content (DLC) of the Doughboy M1911 Pistol, and a Steelbook case. Pre-order bonuses include early access to a DLC map named Giant's Shadow which takes place in the Battle of the Selle, and the Harlem Hellfighter Pack. The Heroes Bundle includes the pre-order bonuses, as well as three days early access to the game, the Red Baron Pack, the Lawrence of Arabia Pack, and five Battlepacks. Battlefield 1 was released worldwide on October 21, 2016, for PlayStation 4, Microsoft Windows, and Xbox One.

Battlefield 1's open beta became available on August 31, 2016, for PlayStation 4, Microsoft Windows, and Xbox One. It ended on September 8, 2016. The open beta allowed the team to ensure that major technical bugs, glitches, and crashes can be patched prior to the game's official launch. 13.2 million players participated in the beta.

== Downloadable content ==
DICE released four downloadable content expansions for Battlefield 1; They Shall Not Pass, In the Name of the Tsar, Turning Tides, and Apocalypse.

=== They Shall Not Pass ===
In December 2016, DICE announced the first major expansion for Battlefield 1, They Shall Not Pass, which was released on March 14, 2017, with a two-week exclusivity period for Premium holders. It focuses on the new playable faction, the French Army; the expansion features four new maps set in the Battle of Verdun and the Second Battle of the Marne; Fort de Vaux, Soissons, Rupture, and Verdun Heights. They Shall Not Pass adds new weapons and vehicles, the Char 2C behemoth, as well as the new melee-oriented "Trench Raider" elite class. Two additional maps named Nivelle Nights and Prise de Tahure, both set during and after the Nivelle Offensive, are included as part of the expansion and were released in Summer 2017. As of May 5, 2018, "They Shall Not Pass" is free for all players via the Xbox, PC, and PlayStation websites, and remained free until May 15 as part of The Road to Battlefield V.

=== In the Name of the Tsar ===
In April 2017, DICE released the first images of the In the Name of the Tsar DLC. This DLC was confirmed during EA Play 2017, where a short amount of footage of it was also shown. In the Name of the Tsar focuses on the Russian Empire during the Great War. The Scout class for the Russian Empire faction features a female soldier representing the Women's Battalion. Four maps in the expansion are set on the Eastern Front; Lupkow Pass, Galicia, Brusilov Keep, and Albion, while two other maps are set in the Russian Civil War between the Russian White Guard and Red Army; Tsaritsyn and Volga River. It also adds 11 new infantry weapons to the game and various new vehicles. In the Name of the Tsar also features a new horseback weapon called the Cavalry Lance. The expansion was released on September 5, 2017, for Premium Pass, with a worldwide release two weeks later. The cover art for this downloadable content expansion features Vendela Lindblom, the Playmate of the Month for the January 2019 issue of Playboy, as a female soldier.

=== Turning Tides ===
The Turning Tides DLC is focused on aspects of the naval and amphibious combat during World War I. DICE released the first half of the expansion to Premium Pass holders on December 11, 2017, containing 2 maps set during the Gallipoli Campaign: Achi Baba and Cape Helles. This expansion adds six new infantry weapons to the game, as well as a new "Infiltrator" elite class, which is equipped with a heliograph spawn beacon gadget, signal flare gun, and the Martini-Henry Grenade Launcher. Turning Tides also brings back the Conquest Assault game mode from previous Battlefield installments. The L-Class Destroyer was introduced as a new naval vehicle in the DLC. For the second half of the expansion, released on January 30, 2018, Turning Tides: North Sea brought more locations involving naval warfare from the Great War. Two new maps were added: Heligoland Bight and Zeebrugge, along with the Royal Marines as a new faction to battle the German Army. The North Sea release also introduced the C-Class Airship as a new air vehicle.

=== Apocalypse ===
The fourth and final DLC for Battlefield 1, the Apocalypse DLC, is centered around some of the most brutal battles of the Great War. The DLC was released on February 20, 2018, containing five maps, six guns, and a new game mode, among other additions.

The three infantry-based maps of Apocalypse reflect three of the bloodiest battles of World War I; "Caporetto" set in present-day Slovenia, "Passchendaele" in Belgium, and "River Somme" in France. The remaining two maps—"Razor's Edge" set in the Alps and "London Calling" over the eponymous city of London—were designed for the new "Air Assault" game mode focused on airplanes and zeppelins. While both maps feature combat above detailed landscapes, neither are based on real battles.

Apocalypse brought no new factions to the game, but introduced new weapons, vehicles, and infantry gadgets. The stationary Livens Projector/Gaswurfminen was added, located on each of the three infantry-based maps. The DLC also features two new air vehicles, the Airco DH.10 Amiens and the Hansa-Brandenburg G.I.

== Reception ==
Reception

Aggregate score
Aggregator	Score
Metacritic	PC: 88/100; PS4: 89/100; XONE: 87/100

Review scores
Publication	Score
Destructoid	8/10
Electronic Gaming Monthly	8/10
Game Informer	9.25/10
GameRevolution	4.5/5
GameSpot	9/10
GamesRadar+	4/5
IGN	9/10
PC Gamer (US)	89/100
Polygon	9/10
PC World	4.5/5

Edit on Wikidata

=== Pre-release ===
The game received positive response from the community after its official announcement. As of May 9, 2016, the Battlefield 1 reveal trailer had become the most liked trailer on YouTube, with over 2 million likes. Electronic Arts expected the game to sell at least 14 million units in its first year of release. Writing for Wired, Julie Muncy felt worried that the game may not be able to reflect the complex situations in World War I, and thought that the war may not be an ideal setting for a video game. In contrast, Zam's Robert Rath reflected on the same themes, and noted that World War I was largely forgotten in popular culture due to its inability to inspire passion or interest; Rath suggested Battlefield 1 could rejuvenate popular interest in the war. For The Guardian, Alex Hern criticized what he perceived as the hypocrisy of those objecting to a video game portrayal of WWI, writing: "Asking whether the First World War is an appropriate topic for a first-person shooter may reveal a more pressing question: why do we think any war is?"

=== Post-release ===
Battlefield 1 received "generally favorable" reviews from critics, according to review aggregator website Metacritic.

Reviewers praised the game's unique, refreshing setting, as well as the risk DICE took when developing a WW1-themed game. The multiplayer component was praised for its solid mechanics, the new game mode Operations, the soundtrack, and the maps, amongst other things. Although International Business Times gave praise to the single-player campaign for its story and level design, they nonetheless criticized it for being too short. PC World also criticized that all six campaigns take place from the viewpoint of the Allied Powers and the viewpoint from the Central Powers is absent.

=== Sales ===
Battlefield 1 was the best-selling retail game in the UK in its week of release. Its launch week sales surpassed the combined sales of both Battlefield 4 and Battlefield Hardline. The PlayStation 4 version topped sales charts in Japan, selling 113,083 copies in its first week. As of January 18, 2017, the PlayStation 4 version had sold 249,053 copies in Japan. Battlefield 1 was the top-selling game in the US in the month of its release. As of April 2018, it is believed that over 15 million copies of the game have been sold worldwide.

=== Accolades ===
Year	Award	Category	Result	Ref.
2016	Game Critics Awards 2016	Best of Show	Nominated	
2016	Game Critics Awards 2016	Best Console Game	Nominated	
2016	Game Critics Awards 2016	Best PC Game	Nominated	
2016	Game Critics Awards 2016	Best Online Multiplayer	Nominated	
2016	Game Critics Awards 2016	Best Action Game	Won	
2016	The Game Awards 2016	Best Game Direction	Nominated	
2016	The Game Awards 2016	Best Music/Sound Design	Nominated	
2016	The Game Awards 2016	Best Multiplayer	Nominated	
2016	The Game Awards 2016	Best Action Game	Nominated	
2016	17th Game Developers Choice Awards	Best Audio	Nominated	
2016	17th Game Developers Choice Awards	Best Technology	Nominated	
2016	17th Game Developers Choice Awards	Audience Award	Won	
2016	Canadian Videogame Awards 2016	Fans' Choice: Best International Game	Nominated	
2017	20th Annual D.I.C.E. Awards	Game of the Year	Nominated	
2017	20th Annual D.I.C.E. Awards	Action Game of the Year	Nominated	
2017	20th Annual D.I.C.E. Awards	Outstanding Achievement in Game Direction	Nominated	
2017	20th Annual D.I.C.E. Awards	Outstanding Achievement in Art Direction	Nominated	
2017	20th Annual D.I.C.E. Awards	Outstanding Achievement in Online Gameplay	Nominated	
2017	20th Annual D.I.C.E. Awards	Outstanding Achievement in Original Music Composition	Nominated	
2017	20th Annual D.I.C.E. Awards	Outstanding Achievement in Sound Design	Won	
2017	20th Annual D.I.C.E. Awards	Outstanding Technical Achievement	Nominated	
2018	Writers' Guild of Great Britain Awards 2018	Best Writing in a Video Game	Nominated	

== See also ==
- List of World War I video games
