= History of the Hajj =

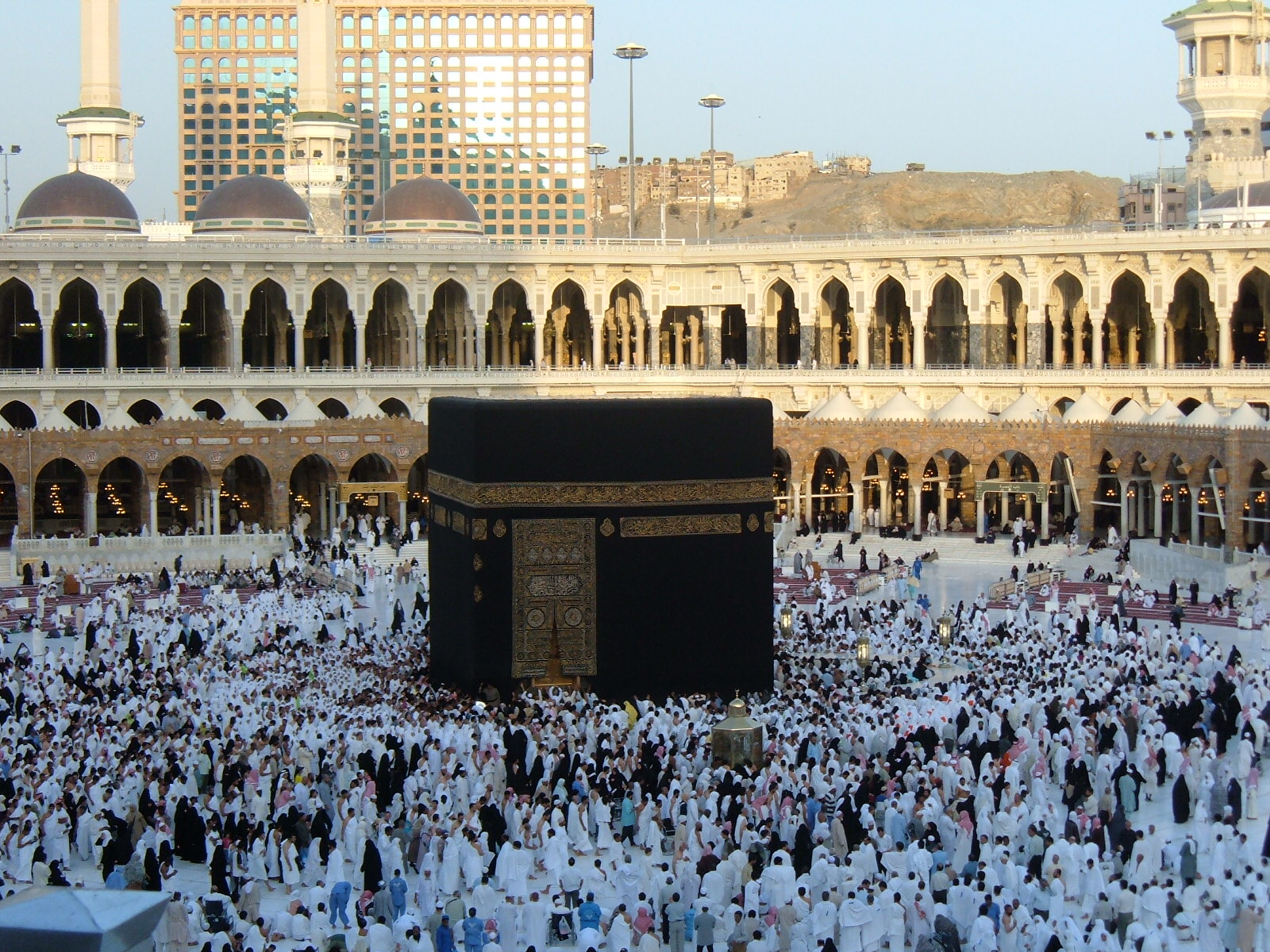
The Kaaba in Mecca is the destination of pilgrimage for the Muslims

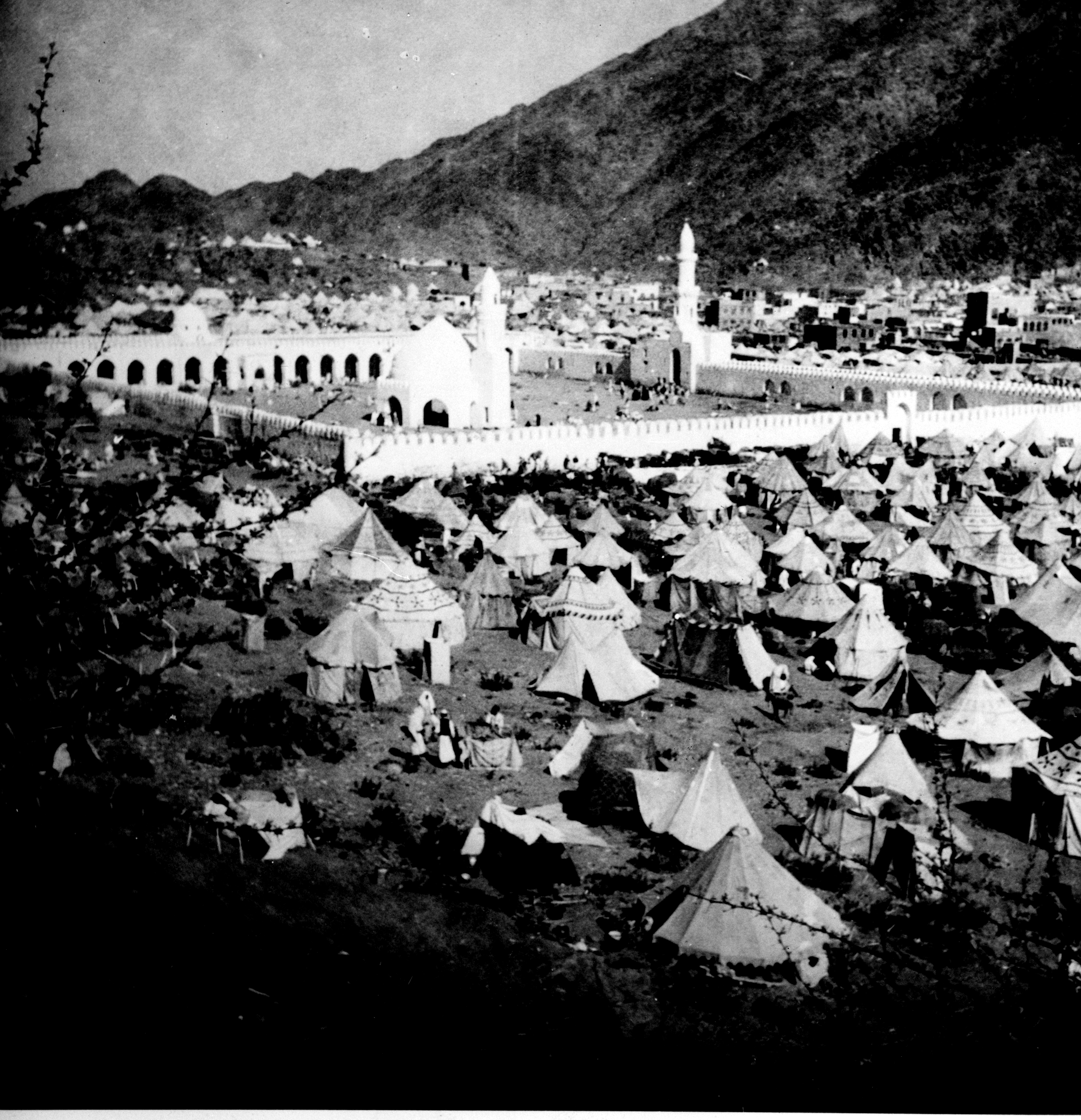
Pilgrim encampment c. 1910

The hajj is a pilgrimage to Mecca performed by millions of Muslims every year, coming from all over the Muslim world. Its history goes back many centuries. The present pattern of the Islamic Hajj was established by Islamic prophet Muhammad, around 632 CE, who reformed the existing pilgrimage tradition of the pagan Arabs. According to Islamic tradition, the hajj dates from thousands of years earlier, from when Abraham, upon God's command, built the Kaaba (the "house of God"). This cubic building is considered the most holy site in Islam and the rituals of the hajj include walking repeatedly around it (circumambulation).

In medieval times, pilgrims would gather in cities like Basra, Damascus, and Cairo to go to Mecca in groups and caravans comprising tens of thousands of pilgrims. Some came from further afield in sailing ships. The Sultans of the Ottoman Empire supported the pilgrims, appointing the Amir al-Hajj ("Commander of the Hajj") to organise and lead the caravans. As other modes of transport including steamships and trains were introduced, pilgrims were able to make the trip to Mecca more quickly.

The nomadic tribes of the desert – known as Bedouin – had been a persistent security issue for the hajj caravans. The annual pilgrimage offered pilgrims as well as professional merchants the opportunity to conduct various merchandising activities both on route and in Mecca, Damascus, and Cairo. Through its history, the hajj has influenced literature and art as pilgrims have written guides and created artistic depictions of the holy sites and rituals.

== Origin ==
In Islamic tradition, pilgrimage was introduced during the time of prophet Ibrahim (Abraham). According to tradition, by God's command, Abraham left his wife Hagar (Hajar) and his son Ishmael (Ismail) alone in the desert of ancient Mecca with little food and water that they soon used up. Mecca was then an uninhabited place. In search of water, Hagar desperately ran seven times between the two hills of Safa and Marwah but found none. Back in despair to Ishmael, she saw the baby scratching the ground with his leg and a water fountain underneath. Because of the presence of water, tribes started to settle in Mecca, Jurhum being the first such tribe to arrive. When grown up, Ishmael married in the tribe and started living with them. The Quran states that Ibrahim, along with his son Ishmael, raised the foundations of a house that is identified by most commentators as the Kaaba. After the placing of the Black Stone in the Eastern corner of the Kaaba, Ibrahim received a revelation in which Allah told the aged prophet that he should now go and proclaim the pilgrimage to mankind. The Quran refers to these incidents in 2:124-127 and 22:27-30. Islamic scholar Shibli Nomani mentions that the house raised by Abraham was 27 feet high, 96 feet long, and 66 feet wide.

== History ==
=== Pre-Islamic Arabia ===
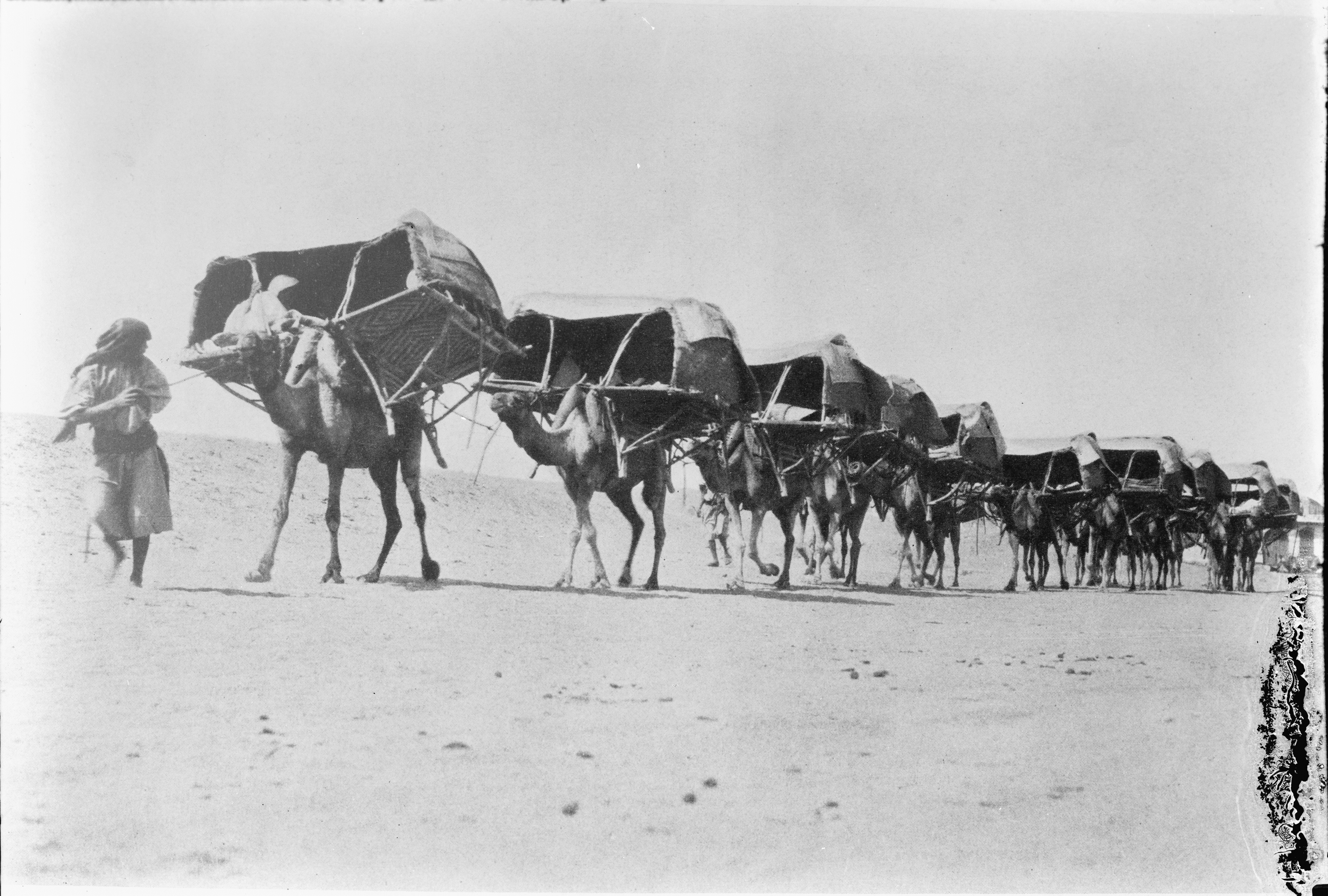
A camel caravan traveling to Mecca for the annual pilgrimage, c. 1910.

The pilgrimage to Mecca is attested in some pre-Islamic Arabic poetry. Compared to Islamic-era poetry where the Hajj appears ubiquitously, only a small number of references are found to it in pre-Islamic poetry, indicating that its Arabian centrality was a development of Islamic times. Among the references that do exist, they are concentrated among poets who resided near Mecca with a notable absence among those in northern, eastern, and southern Arabia. Pre-Islamic poetry consistently associates the Hajj with a single deity (Allah), correlating with the rise of pre-Islamic Arabian monotheism indicated by inscriptions, although the survival of vestigial pagan rites is indicated by the mention of sacrifice stones in these contexts. The rites of the pre-Islamic Hajj in the sixth century were similar to those in the Muslim era, and evidence from the poetry of Zuhayr bin Abi Sulma found in the Mu'allaqat shows that, by the sixth century, the Quraysh (and perhaps earlier, Jurhum) were the custodians of the Kaaba. Some of the main changes between the pre-Islamic and Islamic Hajj instituted by Muhammad appear to have been his decoupling of the Hajj from animal hunting and animal sacrifice rites.

Pre-Islamic Arabia was a region of many pilgrimage rituals beyond that of Hajj. Many words were used to describe pilgrimage, including the Semitic ḥgg. The most important pilgrimage ritual in South Arabia was the one to the Temple of Awwam, dedicated to the god Almaqah, which was associated with a ḥaram or maḥram. A number of other South Arabian deities were also associated with special sanctuaries and pilgrimages, including Dhu Samawi, Qaynan, Siyan, and several more.

=== Muhammad and the Hajj ===
The present pattern of the Hajj was established by Islamic prophet Muhammad who made reforms to the pre-Islamic pilgrimage of the pagan Arabs. Mecca was conquered by the Muslims in 630 CE. Muhammad then destroyed all the pagan idols within the Kaaba, and consecrated the building to Allah. Next year, at the direction of Muhammad, Abu Bakr led 300 Muslims to the pilgrimage in Mecca where Ali delivered a sermon stipulating the new rites of Hajj and abrogating the pagan rites. He especially declared that no unbeliever, pagan, and naked man would be allowed to circumambulate the Kaaba from the next year. In 632 CE, shortly before his death, Muhammad performed his only and last pilgrimage with a large number of followers, and taught them the rites of the Hajj and the manners of performing them. In the plain of Arafat, he delivered a famous speech – known as The Farewell Sermon – to those who were present there. From then, Hajj became one of the Five Pillars of Islam. Hajj was made compulsory in 9th Hijri.

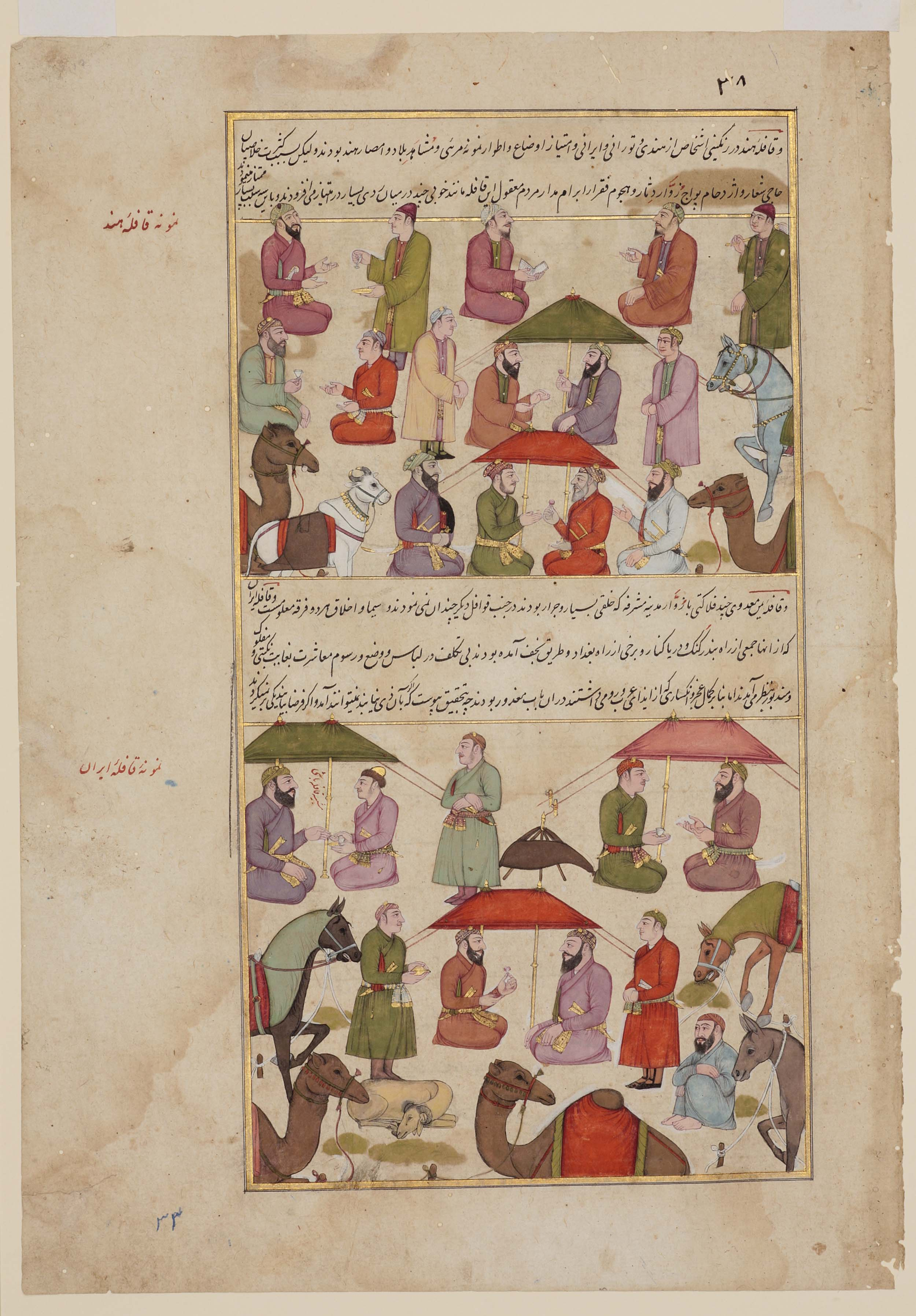
Indian (top) and Iranian (bottom) pilgrim camps depicted in the 1677 Anis al-Hujjaj

=== Caliphate era ===
During medieval times, pilgrims would gather in the capital cities of Syria, Egypt, and Iraq to go to Mecca in groups and caravans comprising tens of thousands of pilgrims. The Muslim rulers would undertake the responsibility of the Hajj, and provide state patronage for organizing such pilgrimage caravans. To facilitate the pilgrimage journey, a road measuring 900 miles was constructed, stretching from Iraq to Mecca and Medina. The road's construction was probably undertaken during the third Abbasid caliph al-Mahdi, father of fifth Abbasid caliph Harun al-Rashid, around 780 CE. It was later named the 'Way of Zubayda' (Darb Zubaidah), after Harun's wife, as she is noted for conducting improvements along the route and furnishing it with water cisterns and eating houses for pilgrims at regular intervals. Both Harun and Zubayda performed the Hajj several times. They also conducted improvement activities in Mecca and Medina, which included the construction of an extensive aqueduct system.

A good deal of information on the medieval hajj comes from the firsthand observations of three Muslim travelers - Nasir Khusraw, Ibn Jubayr, and Ibn Battuta - who themselves performed the pilgrimage and recorded detailed accounts. Khusraw performed the hajj in 1050. Starting his first journey from Granada in 1183, Ibn Jubayr, a native of Spain, performed his pilgrimage in 1184 and then went to Baghdad. Ibn Battuta, a native of Morocco, left his home in 1325 and performed his pilgrimage in 1326. After the fall of Baghdad in 1258 (during Mamluk period), Damascus and Cairo became the main assembly points for the pilgrims. While pilgrims from Syria, Iraq, and Iran, and Anatolia regions joined the Damascus caravan, those from North Africa and Sub-Saharan regions joined the Cairo caravan.

=== Ottoman era ===
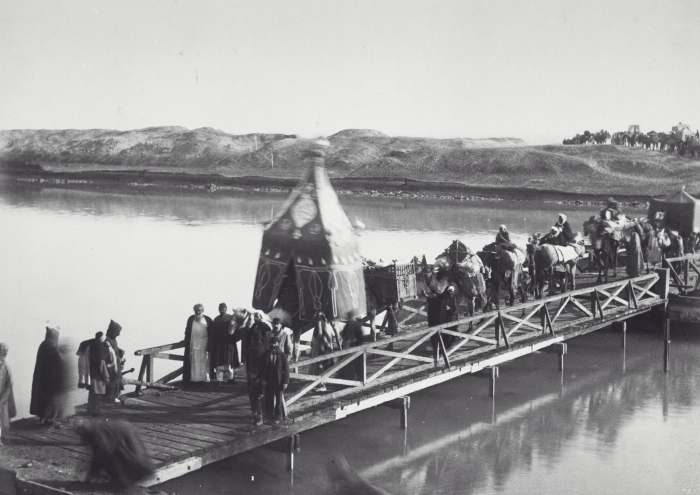
The Egyptian pilgrim caravan crossing the Suez Canal on its way to Mecca, circa 1885

After the Ottomans came into power, the sultans of Ottoman Empire concerned themselves with the management of hajj program, and allocated annual budget for its arrangement. During this period, Damascus and Cairo were still the main points from where the chief hajj caravans would depart and come back. These caravans included thousands of camels for carrying pilgrims, merchants, goods, foodstuff, and water. A lot of people also made their pilgrimage journey on foot. The rulers would supply necessary military forces to ensure security of hajj caravans. Commanders for the caravans leaving from Cairo and Damascus were designated by the Muslim sovereign and were known as Amir al-Hajj. They were in charge of protecting the pilgrims of the caravan, and securing funds and supplies for the journey. Surgeons and physicians were also sent with Syrian caravans to doctor the pilgrims free of costs. During this period, around 20,000 to 60,000 people made their pilgrimage annually.

=== Modern period ===
The route of Hejaz Railway

During the second half of the nineteenth century (after 1850s), steamships began to be used in the pilgrimage journey to Mecca, and the number of pilgrims traveling on sea route increased. With the opening of Suez Canal in 1869, the travel time for pilgrimage was shortened. Initially, the British ship companies had a monopoly in these steamship business and they offered little facilities to the pilgrims. In 1886, the then government of India adopted some regulations to improve the pilgrimage journey from India to Hejaz. During the early twentieth century, the Ottoman Sultan Abdul Hamid II constructed the Hejaz Railway between Damascus and Medina which further facilitated the pilgrimage journey: the pilgrims traveled in relative ease and reached Hejaz in only four days. Starting from Damascus in September 1900, the railway reached Medina in September 1908 having a span of 1,300 kilometers (810 mi). The railroad was damaged during the First World War by an Arab Revolt force led by British officer T. E. Lawrence. Plague used to break out almost every year until 1918.

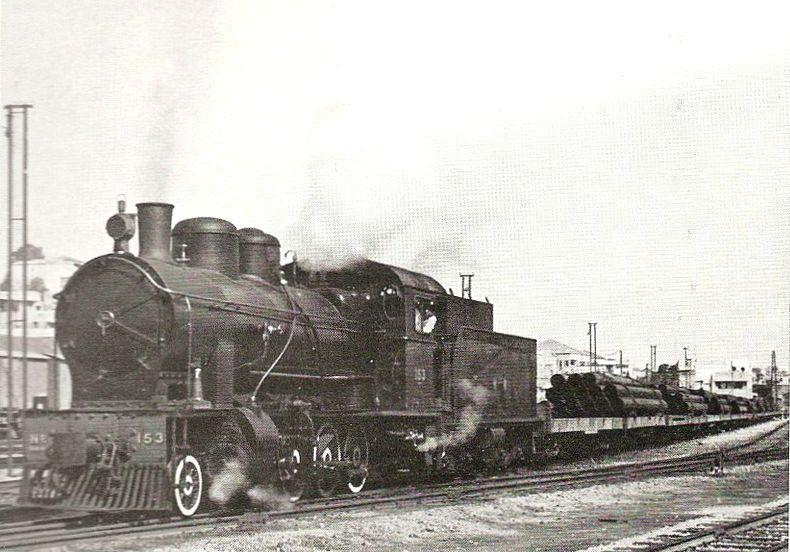
Swiss Locomotive and Machine Works in Switzerland built a class of ten 2-8-0 locomotives for the Hejaz Railway in 1912, numbered 87–96.

After a contract between the Saudi Arabian government and the Misr Airlines of Egypt in 1936, the Misr Airlines introduced the first airline service for Hajj pilgrims in 1937. The subsequent engine trouble of the aircraft disrupted the hajj flights, and the Second World War from 1939 to 1945 caused a decrease in pilgrims' number. Modern transportation systems in the pilgrimage journey effectively began only after the Second World War. Saudi Arabia established the Arabian Transport Company and the Bakhashab Transport Company, in 1946 and 1948, respectively, in order to transport the pilgrims at various Hajj sites which proved highly effective in later years, and the use of camels as a means of transport for pilgrimage journeys virtually ended in 1950. According to one account, during the pilgrimage seasons of 1946–1950, around 80% of the total foreign pilgrims arrived by sea, 10% by land, and 7% by air transport. The 1970s and subsequent decades saw a dramatic increase in the number of pilgrims because of the availability of affordable air travel system.

In 1979, a large group of rebels seized the mosque. This was known as the Grand Mosque seizure. It took two weeks for the authorities to bring the situation under control and the rebels were later executed. In recent years there have been several notable incidents such as human crushes in 2004 and 2006, a crane collapse in 2015 and a crush in the same year; the government of Saudi Arabia has spent billions of dollars in crowd control and safety measures. During the COVID-19 pandemic, only 10,000 people were allowed to participate in the Hajj of 2020, with pilgrim numbers rising to 59,000 in 2021. Amidst the lifting of COVID-19 pandemic restrictions, Hajj participation figures rebounded to 926,000 in 2022, and roughly doubled to 1.84 million in 2023.

== Hajj routes ==
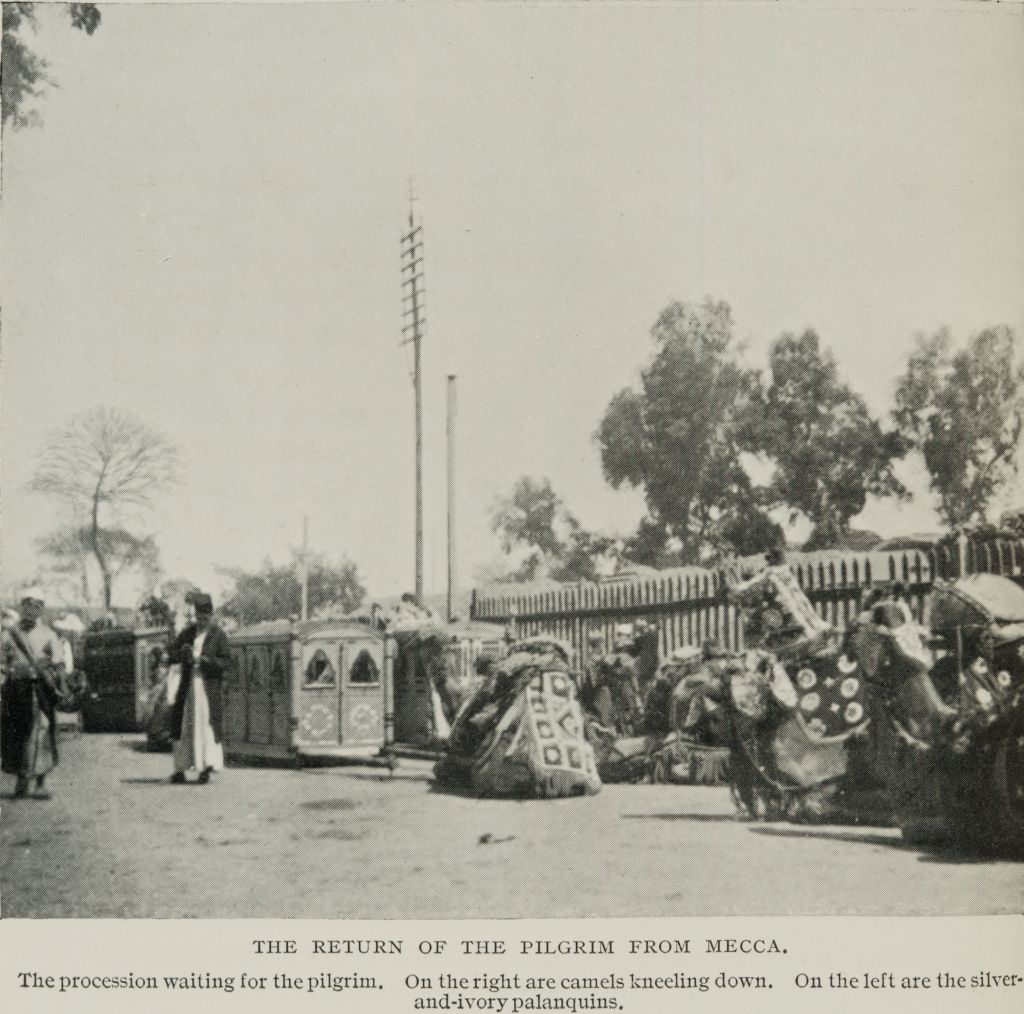
The procession waiting for the pilgrim. On the right are camels kneeling down. On the left are the silver-and-ivory palanquins, 1911.

=== Syrian route ===
The Syrian Hajj caravan (darb al-Hajj al-Shami) traveled a preexisting route, the King's Highway, which was improved by the Umayyads (632-750). During their rule, the route also served as one of the main arteries of the Islamic world, connecting the Umayyad capital of Damascus with Mecca and Medina. Following the Abbasid Revolution in 750 and the corresponding shift of the Islamic center of power from Damascus to Baghdad, the Hajj route from Damascus waned in importance. Nonetheless, the Syrian route continued to be used through the 11th century and the number of pilgrims traveling it may have increased as well. During Crusader rule in Palestine and Transjordan during the 12th and 13th centuries, the Syrian Hajj was significantly disrupted, partly due to the establishment of Crusader fortresses at al-Karak, Shawbak and Ayla, which blocked the traditional caravan route to the Hejaz. At times, the Hajj was suspended for years and pilgrims sought alternative routes. This state of affairs continued until the Ayyubid expulsion of the Crusaders from Transjordan in the late 1180s and the Crusaders' complete expulsion from Palestine by the Mamluks in the late 13th century.

The onset of Mamluk rule was a major stabilizing factor for the Syrian Hajj because Syria, Egypt and the Hejaz were unified under a single centralized authority. The Mongol destruction of Abbasid Baghdad also contributed to the resurgence of Damascus's importance as an assembly point for pilgrims; Iraqi, Persian and Khurasani pilgrims who had previously used Baghdad and Kufa as marshaling points now used Damascus. The other principal marshaling point after 1258 was the Mamluk capital of Cairo. While Damascus was the official marshaling point of Syria, Aleppo in the north and al-Karak in the south, sometimes served as semi-official marshaling points. The pilgrim caravan leaving Damascus was under the official leadership of the amir al-hajj (Hajj caravan commander), who was mostly appointed by the Mamluk viceroy of Damascus, but sometimes directly appointed by the sultan in Cairo. With the exception of Birket Ziza (modern-day al-Jiza), the Mamluks did not fortify the stops along the Syrian Hajj route or build facilities, unlike the Egyptian caravan route, whose way-stations were well-fortified.

By 1517, the Ottoman Empire conquered the Mamluk realm, and adopted the religious authority of the caliphate and the guardianship of Mecca and Medina. With this came the responsibility of protecting and supplying the annual Hajj caravan. The Ottomans adopted a two-pronged approach to ensuring the caravan's safe passage: bribing the Bedouin tribes to desist from raiding the pilgrims and building a network of desert fortifications at the water sources and rest stops along the route to Medina. The forts served to both demonstrate Ottoman religious authority and deter marauders. Sultan Selim I (r. 1512–1520) built such forts at al-Sanamayn, Muzayrib and Tell Far'un, all located in the Hauran hinterland of Damascus. By 1563, the Ottomans built forts in the southern expanses of Transjordan and the northern Hejaz, including al-Qatrana, Ma'an, Dhat al-Hajj, Tabuk, al-Ukhaydir and al-Ula. In 1576, a fort was built at Hadiyya north of Medina. The forts were mostly commissioned by the governors of Damascus with imperial sanction. The 16th-century Hajj forts were generally built around a square courtyard and consisted of three stories. Their ground floors were typically composed of small vaulted rooms, and open staircases led to the second and third floors, the latter of which had a parapet.

After the 1570s, Ottoman building activity along the Hajj route ceased until the 18th-century military construction boom in Palestine, Transjordan and the Hejaz. Hajj forts built during this period included Dab'a and Hasa in Transjordan, and Fassu'a, al-Mudawwara, Mada'in Saleh and al-Nakhlayn in the Hejaz. The major innovation to the 18th-century forts was the increase in gunner slits and the increase in the number and size of gateways. The forts lacked decoration and were mostly simple structures. The 18th-century construction wave coincided with an uptick of Bedouin raids against the Hajj caravans, with the most serious being the 1757 raid by the Bani Sakhr, in which 20,000 pilgrims died. The increased attacks were due to the successive Shammar and Annizah invasions of the Bani Sakhr's territory and sources of income, and the Ottomans' failure to make their traditional payments to the Bedouin tribes in return for peace on the desert route.

==== Course ====
The exact course of the medieval Syrian route is unclear, though it is known that the route changed depending on the time of year when the Hajj started (the lunar calendar is used in Islam), security conditions and availability of water. The route followed the King's Highway until al-Karak where it veered to the southeast of the route, bypassing the fortified urban centers of Shawbak and Ayla on its way to Tabuk. From there, the caravan proceeded to Medina, the first pilgrimage site of the Hajj. The Ottomans continued to use this route, but built a network of forts at the numerous rest stops and watering places along the route.

By modern country:

- Syria: forts 1-7 (Sulaymaniyya Takiyya - Muzayrib)
- Jordan: forts 8-17 (Mafraq - Mudawwara)
- Saudi Arabia: forts 18-32 (Dhat al-Hajj - Hafira at Medina)
1. Sulaymaniyya Takiyya
2. Maydan
3. Kiswa (Al-Kiswah)
4. Khan Dannun
5. Ghabaghib
6. Sanamayn
7. Muzayrib
8. Mafraq: Khan or Qal'at el-Mafraq
9. Manzil az-Zarqa or Qasr Shabib/ Shebib (32°03′48″N 36°04′56″E)
10. Birkat Zizia: Manzil or Qal'at Zizya
11. Dab'ah: Manzil or Qal'at Dab'ah (see pin map at Theeb: Qasr Dab'ah about 40 km SSE of Amman; previously Qal'at Balqa'; 31°35′46″N 36°03′02″E)
12. Qatrana: Khan Qatrana/Qasr al-Qatraneh (31°14′30″N 36°02′23″E)
13. Hasa/el-Hassa: Khan al-Hasa/ Qal'at al-Hasa (1760), stands next to a bridge (c. 1730–33) over Wadi el-Hasa in its upper course, 5 km northwest of the Hejaz railway station, at 30°50′21″N 35°56′01″E.
14. Uneiza ('Unayzah): Khan al-'Unayzah/ Qal'at 'Unaiza (30°29′17″N 35°47′43″E)
15. Ma'an: Manzilt or Qal'at Ma'an
16. Fassu'a: Manzilt or Qal'at Fassu'a (29°45′55″N 35°52′51″E)
17. Mudawwara: Manzilt or Qal'at al-Mudawwara (29°19′23″N 35°59′28″E)
18. Dhat al-Hajj
19. Tabuk: Tabuk Castle
20. Qalandariyya
21. al-Ukhaydir: Qal'at al-Akhdar
22. Muazzem/Al-Mu'azzam
23. Dar al-Hamra
24. Mada'in Saleh/Meda'in Saleh (Al-Hijr/Hegra)
25. Al-'Ula
26. Bir al-Ghannam
27. Zumurrud/Zumrud
28. Sawrah
29. Hadiyya (Hadiyyah, Al Madinah)
30. Nakhlatayn
31. Wadi al-Qura
32. Hafira/al-Hafirah

==== Administration ====
The Ottoman government financed and organized the Hajj caravans from Syria and Egypt. Although the imperial government was responsible for some formalities, the Syrian caravan was largely the prerogative of the beylerbey (governor) of Damascus. The chief government official of the caravan was the amir al-hajj. The Ottomans' first Damascus governor, Janbirdi al-Ghazali, cleared the route between Damascus and Aqaba (Ayla) of nomadic raiders and ensured the caravan's safe passage by 1520. However, he revolted and was killed and replaced by Ayas Mehmed Pasha, who established what historian F. E. Peters called a "dangerous and expensive precedent" by bribing the Bedouin tribes not to attack the caravan. The office of amir al-hajj of the Syrian Hajj was initially filled by senior Mamluk leftovers in Damascus, then after 1571, by an array of local leaders who often held the governorships of Gaza, Nablus, Ajlun and al-Karak. Beginning in 1708, the Sublime Porte established a policy whereby the governor of Damascus was required to serve as amir al-hajj.

The imperial government calculated the projected expenses and income of the Hajj, which were assessed by the bashdefterdar (treasury minister). Based on the devised budget, the grand vizier instructed the governor of Damascus to collect the necessary taxes; the governor was the chief collection and disbursement officer of the caravan. A major part of the tax revenues of Damascus, namely from land and poll taxes, were earmarked for the Hajj. The Hajj budget was deducted from the total annual revenues Damascus owed the imperial government. According to Peters, the expenses of the caravan virtually amounted to the cost of an annual military campaign. Among the typical expenses of the caravan were the wages and gifts of government and mercenary troops, transport camels, provisions and protection payments to Bedouin tribes. The expenses consistently rose over time, making up an increasingly larger part of the provincial expenditures. To acquire the necessary funds, the governor of Damascus began an expedition called the dawra (collection tour) to areas under his jurisdiction to collect or extort dues from the inhabitants. Eventually, the government could not meet the required expenses and relied on wealthy individuals to contribute, often in return for appointment as amir al-hajj.

The payoff to Bedouin tribes was not clearly listed in the expenditure records, often being characterized as "general expenses". While some particularly pious pilgrims made the trek to the Muslim holy cities on foot, most pilgrims, along with merchants, troops and government officials and their servants traveled on camels. Thus, thousands of camels had to be purchased or leased annually for the Hajj. The camels of the Syrian caravan were supplied by peasants from the Hawran or the Bedouin tribesmen of the Syrian steppe around Palmyra. The camels were typically transacted between the amir al-hajj and brokerage corporations called muqawwimat, though a few individuals made direct transactions with suppliers. Muzayrib in Hawran, rather than Damascus, served as the main delivery point for the camels. The government attempted to breed their own camels on occasion, but these initiatives were often short-lived projects.

Funds also had to be provided for the troops manning the forts along the route, who all came from the garrisons in Damascus, which were divided into main categories: imperial Janissaries sent from the imperial capital Constantinople and locally recruited Janissaries. Imperial Janissaries served at Muzayrib, Unayzah, Mu'azzam and Ma'an, while local Janissaries served as-Sanamayn, al-Qatranah, al-Karak, Mada'in Salih and al-Ukhaydir. In the 16th through 18th centuries, an individual soldier's pay remained steady at five akçe a day. However, the troops derived additional funds by engaging in their own commerce whereby they would buy cheap goods from the local inhabitants and sell them at high prices to the Hajj pilgrims. At times, they would also illegally sell supplies and foodstuffs reserved for the pilgrims to Bedouin tribesmen.

The Hajj was an "annual budgeted enterprise", which "took the better part of a year" to complete, according to Peters. In the third month of the year, the Sublime Porte began devising the budget of the caravan. In the seventh month, the Sublime Porte sent Damascus funds to be distributed to the inhabitants of Mecca and Medina and the upkeep of the cities' holy sites. The dawra took place during the eighth and ninth months. The Hajj caravan departed from Damascus around the 10th of Shawwal (tenth month of the Islamic calendar), with most pilgrims having arrived in Damascus from other parts of Syria, Anatolia, Iraq, Iran and far eastern regions by the previous week. An armed relief caravan called the jarda departed Damascus in the eleventh or twelfth month to meet the returning caravan and assist in its protection. Both the main and jarda caravans would make it back to Damascus in the second month of the new year.

=== Iraqi routes ===
The 1,140-kilometer-long Hajj route from Kufa to Mecca was called the Darb Zubayda ('Zubaydah Trail'). It was established by the Abbasids in the 9th century, its chief patrons being Caliph Harun al-Rashid (r. 786–809) and his consort, the route's namesake Zubayda bint Ja'far (d. 831). The route consisted of numerous structures along the way to support the pilgrims en route. These included over 1,300 wells, over 100 reservoirs, 54 way-stations and several underground canals, fire beacons and milestones. According to historian Marcus Milwright, "The construction of a passage through harsh and arid terrain was a major undertaking ... The diversity of technology represented in hydraulic engineering suggests that skilled craftsmen were brought from many regions of the Abbasid Caliphate to work on the Darb Zubayda". The route from Baghdad and Kufa was largely disused after the destructive Mongol invasion of Iraq in 1258. Afterward, pilgrims from Iraq, Iran and Khurasan, most of whom were Shia Muslims, assembled at Damascus. They typically reaching Damascus by first assembling in Baghdad, then crossing through Upper Mesopotamia and then eastward to Aleppo, where they joined pilgrims heading southward.

The principal gathering points for the pilgrims were Kufa and Basra. Darb Zubayda started from Kufa, ran through Fayd (a place near Jabal Shammar in north-central Saudi Arabia), crossed the Najd region (a region in central Saudi Arabia), proceeded to Medina, and then reached Mecca.

=== Egyptian route ===
For the Egyptian route, the pilgrims would gather in Cairo, and after four days, start for the ground of Ajrud (24 kilometers northwest of Suez), and from there they would reach Suez, and crossing the Sinai Peninsula through Al-Nakhl point, they would reach Aqaba (in south part of present-day Jordan), then traveling parallel to the Red Sea, they reach Yanbu, then proceed to Medina, and finally reach Mecca. The hajj caravans would start their pilgrimage journey from there, traveled by land or sea and through deserts, and, after the performance of pilgrimage, return there. The total journey would take approximately two to three months on average.

=== Yemeni route ===
The pilgrim assembly point in Yemen was Sana'a, where the caravan split into two parts, with one using the highland route and the other taking the coastal route. The highland route was leveled and paved, and in some places curbs were built. There were numerous reservoirs, wells, mosques and milestones along the highland route.

=== From further afield ===
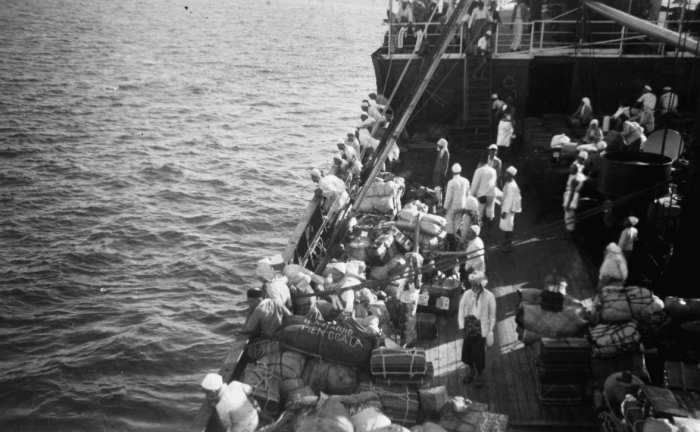
Mecca pilgrims from the Netherlands East Indies (today Indonesia) on board of the Rotterdamsche Lloyd steamer Kota Nopan, in the Red Sea, 1937.

The pilgrimage to Mecca was mainly an overland journey using camels as a means of transport. Throughout the history, however, many distant pilgrims from the Maghreb, the Indian subcontinent, and Southeast Asia also had to use various sea routes to reach Hejaz. The Anis Al-Hujjaj is an illustrated account of a Hajj taken in 1677 by a member of the Mughal court. With other pilgrims, he crossed in a ship from Surat to Jeddah via Mocha, Yemen. Pilgrims from Maghreb (Tunisia, Algeria, Libya) would travel through the lower coast of Mediterranean sea to reach and join the Cairo caravans. Some pilgrims coming from Africa would cross the Red Sea to reach the Hejaz, and then to Mecca.

== Mahmal, royal power symbols ==
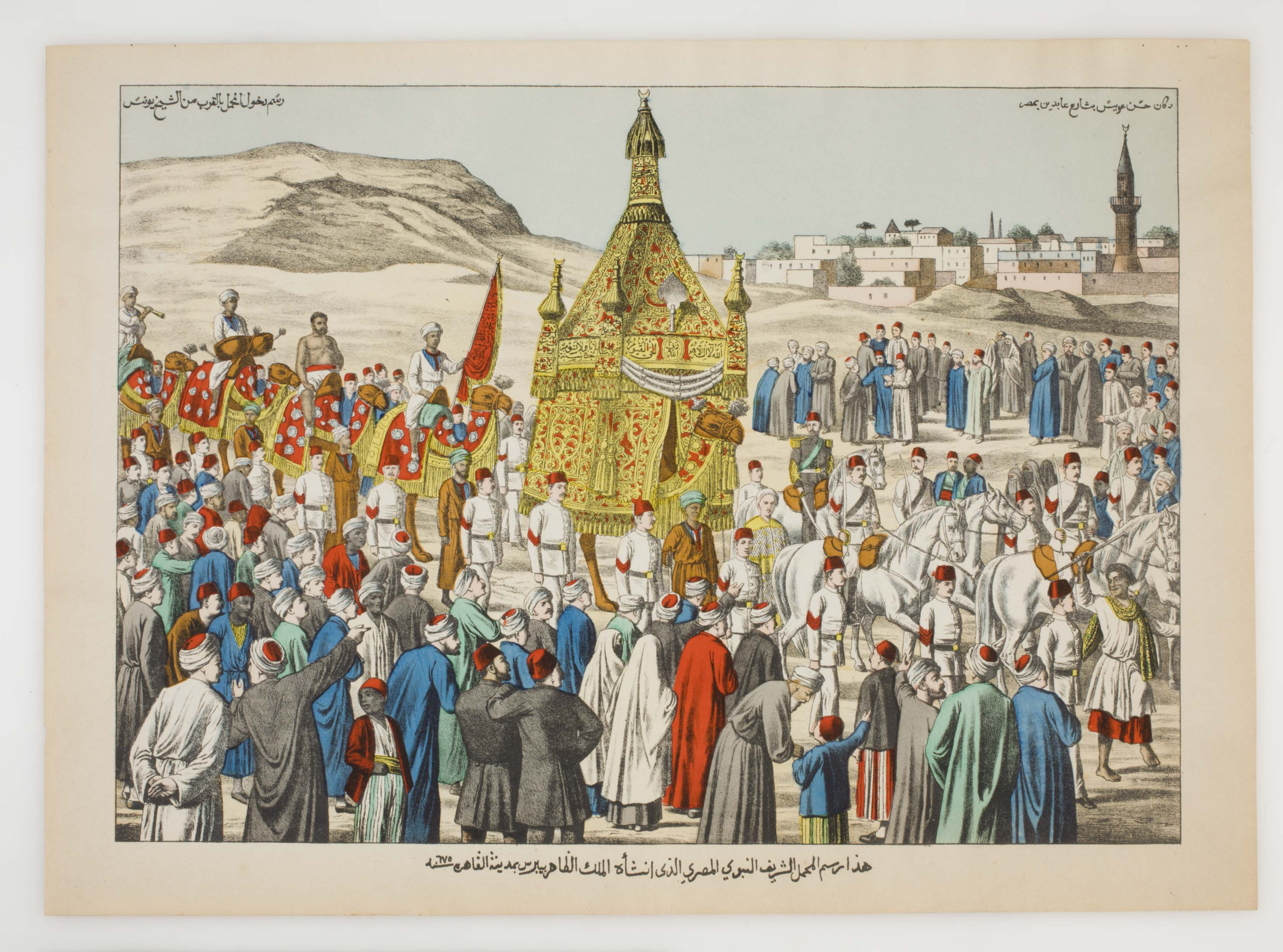
The Egyptian Mahmal on its way to Mecca, c. 1880

A mahmal was a ceremonial passenger-less litter that was carried on a camel among the pilgrim caravan each year from the 13th century to the mid-20th. It symbolised the political power of the sultans who sent it, demonstrating their custody of Islam's holy sites. Mahmals were sent from Cairo, Damascus, Yemen, Hyderabad, Darfur, and the Timurid Empire in different periods. The arrival of a mahmal in Mecca was a significant occasion which local people and pilgrims came out to watch. Before entry to the city, the simple textiles which had covered the mahmal on its journey were replaced with the kiswah: an ornate, colourful textile embroidered with verses from the Quran and the tughra (emblem) of the sponsoring sultan. Mahmals from different countries competed for the best position in front of the Kaaba. A mahmal returning from Mecca to its city of origin was regarded as carrying barakah (blessing). As the procession returned, parents brought out their children to touch the mahmal, and people briefly put their handkerchiefs inside it.

== Taxation on pilgrims ==
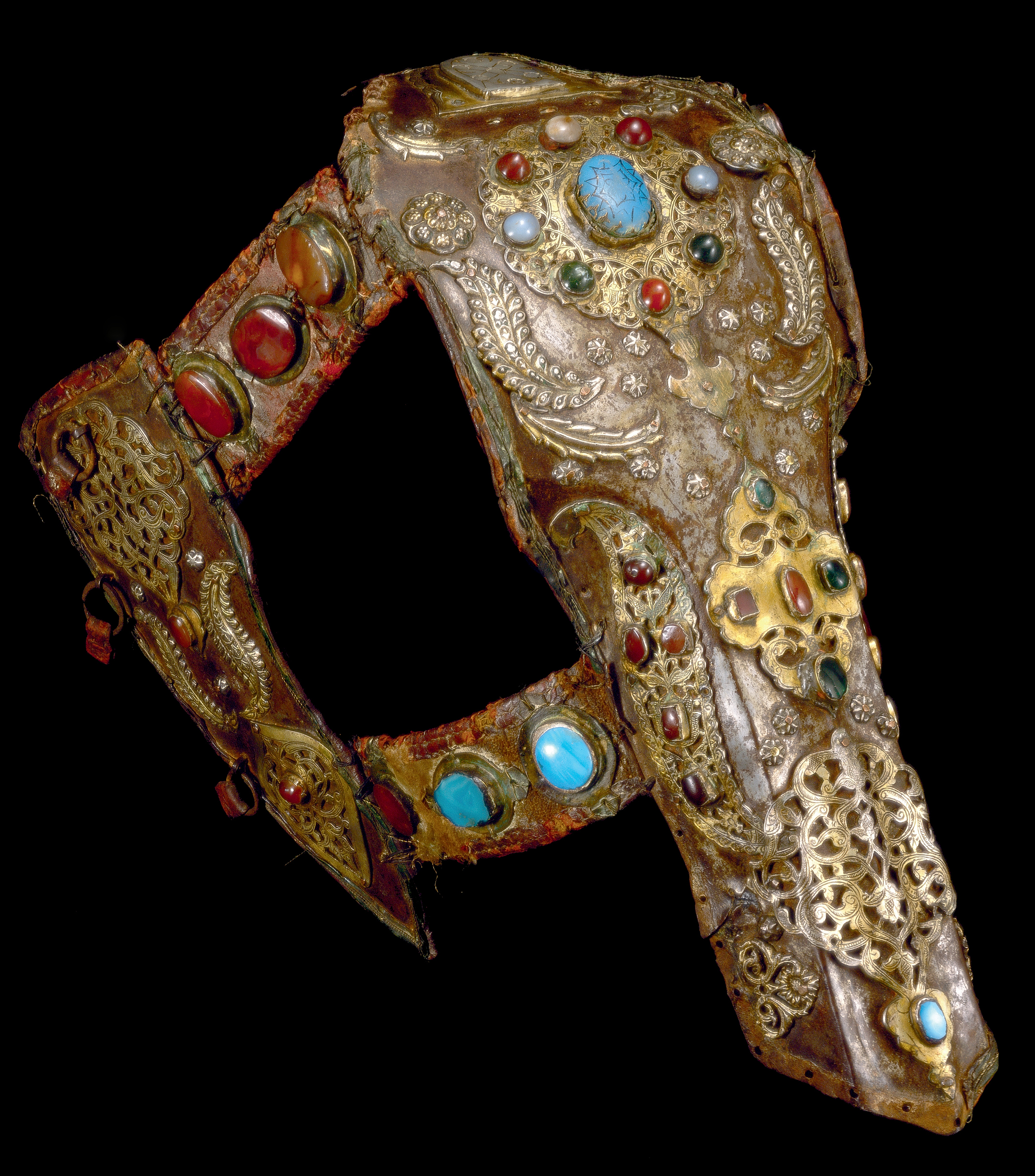
Ornamental chamfron (face armour) for a camel or horse in the Mahmal procession, Ottoman Empire, 18th century.

According to Ibn Jubayr, during the period of Fatimid overlordship over the Hejaz, taxes were imposed on the pilgrims by the local rulers of Hejaz at the rate of seven and a half gold dinar per head. Those who were unable to pay them had to suffer extreme physical torture. However, imposing taxes on the pilgrims was considered illegal by the Islamic jurists. After Saladin overthrew the Fatimid Caliphate around 1171 and established the Ayyubid dynasty, attempts were made by him to abolish the taxes on the pilgrims. Saladin's removal of illegal taxes was praised by Ibn Jubayr. Saladin's measures, however, proved insufficient, especially in later times, partly because there were other taxes (like taxes on hajj caravans or camels) and also because the administrative decisions, taken in Damascus or Cairo, were not easy to be applied effectively in Hejaz due to long distance. Some of the later Mamluk sultans – like Baybers and Hassan – made active attempts to control the Meccan local rulers from taxing the pilgrim caravans by compensating the Meccan rulers with annual allocation of a fixed sum of money. Al-Suyuti mentions that in the year 384 AH (around 994 CE), pilgrims who came from Iraq, Syria, and Yemen to perform hajj went back unsuccessful because they were not allowed to perform hajj without paying tax. Only Egyptian pilgrims performed hajj that year.

== Bedouin security issues ==
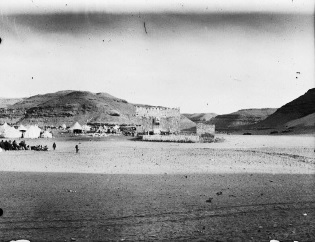
An Ottoman fort in Saudi Arabia, adjacent to Bedouin encampments, 1907.

Throughout the history of the hajj, the nomadic tribes of desert – known as Bedouin – have been a persistent security issue for the hajj caravans. They often used to attack the caravans – hajj or merchandise – that passed their territories. They had to be paid in exchange for the security of the hajj caravans. The head of the regime would hand over the payment to the Amir al-Hajj – the commander in charge of the hajj caravans – who would then make the payments to the Bedouin according to the demands of the situation. Even then, there were occasional casualties. In 1757, a Bedouin tribe, Bani Sakhr, attacked the hajj caravans that resulted in the death of many pilgrims, immediately and afterwards, as well as other casualties.

== Trading activities ==
Throughout the history, the pilgrimage journey to Mecca had offered the pilgrims as well as the professional merchants the opportunity to conduct various merchandising activities both en route and in Mecca, Damascus, and Cairo. The exemption of customs on land and the security provided to the hajj caravans further made it a lucrative field for trading. Many pilgrims brought goods, produced in their respective lands, in order to sell them, thus becoming an occasional trader, and managing some expenses for hajj trip. According to John Lewis Burckhardt, the Afghans brought coarse shawls, beads of stone, tooth-brush; the European Turks brought shoes, slippers, knit silk purse, embroidered items, and sweetmeats; the Anatolian Turks brought Angora shawls and carpet; the pilgrims of Maghreb brought cloaks made of wool. The professional businessmen conducted large-scale merchandising activities that included transportation of goods between Mecca and their own towns as well as sales alone the hajj route. The Indian and other Eastern goods, brought to Mecca by ships, were purchased by big merchants of Cairo and Damascus who, upon return, then sold them in their own markets. These goods generally included Indian textile, various spices, coffee, drugs, and precious stones.

== Hajj certificates ==
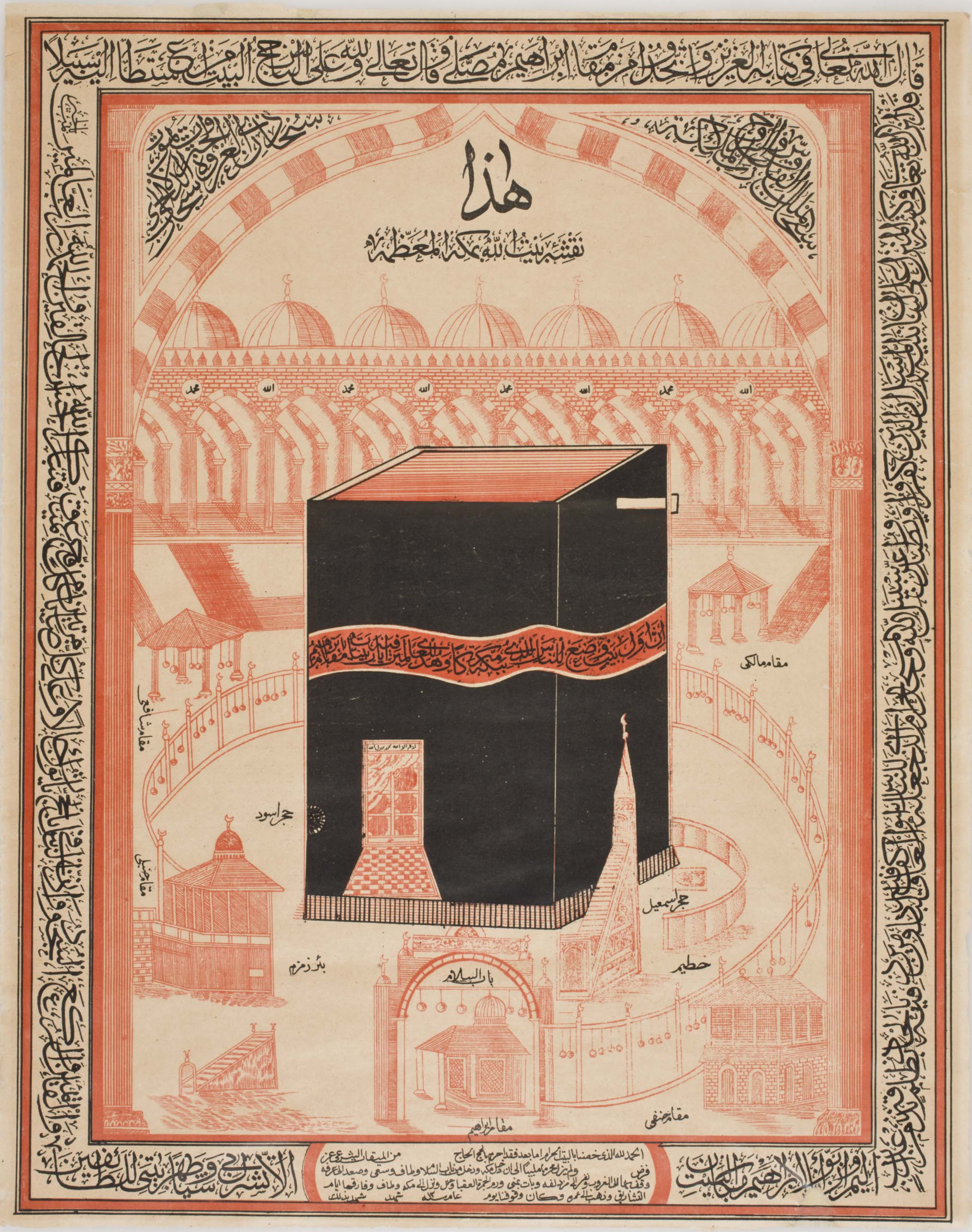
Early 20th century Hajj certificate illustrating, with captions, features of the Mecca sanctuary.

From the 11th century to the early 20th century, pilgrims could obtain paper Hajj certificates which they would typically display in their homes. The earliest known certificates, from the 11th century, are purely calligraphic works. From the late 12th century onwards, they included depictions of the Kaaba and other holy sites, either hand-painted or woodblock printed. These are some of the earliest surviving figurative depictions of these sites. Over the years, the certificates became more colourful. Being distributed throughout the Muslim world by returning pilgrims, they were used as references for other artistic depictions of the holy sites. They served as maps and guides to the pilgrimage routes. Later certificates listed the rites that a pilgrim had performed at each location, and illustrated the locations in vertical sequence. By confirming the devotional activities of the pilgrim in the sight of Allah, the certificates were seen as a source of barakah (blessing), which was enhanced by them being made near the holy site of Mecca and bearing Quranic text. Certificates that survive include that of the 16th century Ottoman prince Mehmed.

== See also ==
- 1757 Hajj caravan raid
- Hajj: Journey to the Heart of Islam, 2012 British Museum exhibition
- History of Islam
- Khalili Collection of Hajj and the Arts of Pilgrimage
- Sack of Mecca (930)
- Udhruh for similar Ottoman-period fort

== Bibliography ==
- Al-Hariri Rifai, W. (1990). The Heritage of the Kingdom of Saudi Arabia. Washington DC: GDG Publications. p. 37. ISBN 0-9624483-0-3.
- Al-Suyuti, J. Tarikh al-Khulafa (History of the Caliphs).
- Campo, Juan E., ed. (2009). "Muhammad". Encyclopedia of Islam. Facts On File. p. 494. ISBN 978-0-8160-5454-1.
- Cosman, M. P.; Jones, Linda G. (2008). Handbook to Life in the Medieval World. New York: Facts On File. p. 814. ISBN 978-0-8160-4887-8.
- Davidson, Linda Kay; Gitlitz, David Martin (2002). Pilgrimage: From the Ganges to Graceland: An Encyclopedia, Volume 1. California: ABC-CLIO. p. 220. ISBN 1-57607-004-2.
- Dost, Suleyman (2023). "Pilgrimage in Pre-Islamic Arabia: Continuity and Rupture from Epigraphic Texts to the Qur'an". Millennium. 20 (1): 15–32.
- Friedman, John Block; Figg, Kristen Mossler, eds. (2013). "Ibn Jubayr (1145–1217)". Trade, Travel, and Exploration in the Middle Ages: An Encyclopedia. Routledge. p. 270. ISBN 978-1135590949.
- Haykal, M.H. (2008). The Life of Muhammad. Selangor: Islamic Book Trust. ISBN 978-983-9154-17-7.
- Maraqten, Mohammed (2015). "The Pilgrimage to the Awām Temple/Maḥram Bilqīs, Ma'rib, Yemen". In Arbach, Mounir; Schiettecatte, Jérémie (eds.). Pre-Islamic South Arabia and its Neighbours: New Developments of Research. Archaeopress. pp. 107–133.
- Maraqten, Mohammed (2021). "The Pilgrimage to the Awām Temple/Maḥram Bilqīs, Ma'rib, Yemen". In Hatke, George; Ruzicka, Ronald (eds.). South Arabian Long-Distance Trade in Antiquity. Cambridge Scholars Publishing. pp. 430–462.
- Milwright, Marcus (2014). "Archaeology". In Fitzpatrick, Coeli; Walker, Adam Hani (eds.). Muhammad in History, Thought, and Culture: An Encyclopedia of the Prophet of God. ABC-Clio.
- Munt, Harry (2015). "Pilgrimage in Pre-Islamic Arabia and Late Antiquity". In Tagliacozzo, Eric; Toorawa, Shawkat (eds.). The Hajj: Pilgrimage in Islam. Cambridge University Press. pp. 13–30.
- Peters, F. E. (1994). The Hajj: The Muslim Pilgrimage to Mecca and the Holy Places. New Jersey: Princeton University Press. ISBN 0-691-02120-1.
- Petersen, Andrew (2012). The Medieval and Ottoman Hajj Route in Jordan: An Archaeological and Historical Study. Council for British Research in the Levant. ISBN 1842175025.
- Robin, Christian Julien (2018). "Marib et Makka : deux pèlerinages de l'Arabie préislamique qui se tenaient à la veille de l'équinoxe de printemps". Graeco-Arabica, 12, 2017 (= 13th Internat. Congress on Graeco-Oriental and African Studies, Proceedings). Herodotus. pp. 661–673.
- Robinson, F., ed. (1996). The Cambridge Illustrated History of the Islamic World. Cambridge University Press. ISBN 9780521669931.
- Singer, A. (2002). Constructing Ottoman Beneficence: An Imperial Soup Kitchen in Jerusalem. SUNY Press. p. 141. ISBN 9780791453513.
- Tagliacozzo, E.; Toorawa, S., eds. (2016). The Hajj: Pilgrimage in Islam. New York: Cambridge University Press. p. 113. ISBN 978-1-107-61280-8.
- Webb, Peter (2023). "The Hajj Before Muhammad: The Early Evidence in Poetry and Hadith". Millennium. 20 (1): 33–63. doi:10.1515/mill-2023-0004. hdl:1887/3674390.
