= Vendela Lindblom =

Swedish Brazilian model

Playboy centerfold appearance
- January 2019
- Preceded by: Jordan Emanuel
- Succeeded by: Megan Moore

Personal details
- Born: November 11, 1995 (age 29); Stockholm, Sweden
- Height: 5 ft 6 in (1.68 m)

Vendela Lindblom (born November 11, 1995) is a Swedish Brazilian model, and the first Playboy Playmate of the Month with a shaved head.

== Life and career ==
Lindblom was born and raised in Stockholm, Sweden and moved to Los Angeles in 2016.

She was chosen as Playmate of the Month for the January 2019 issue of Playboy magazine, becoming the first model to ever pose for the magazine with a shaved head.

Lindblom has done numerous campaigns as a model and was featured in various music videos.

Lindblom has appeared on the cover of the video game Battlefield 1 - In the Name of the Tsar, where she posed as the model for the game's first female multiplayer character.

== See also ==
- List of people in Playboy 2010–2019
