= Tabuk Castle =

Historical castle in Tabuk, Saudi Arabia

Tabuk Castle قلعة تبوك
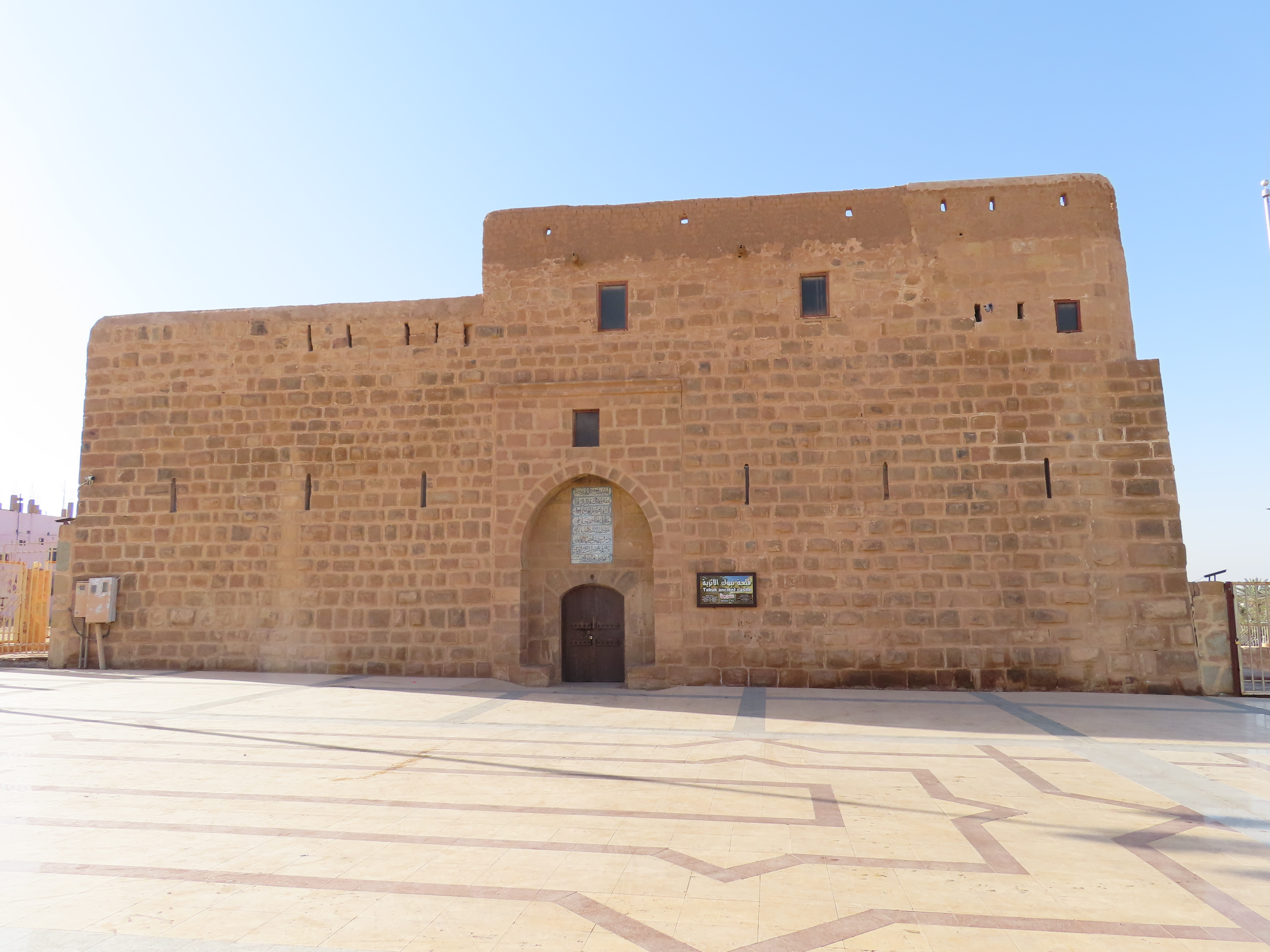
- Tabuk Castle in 2022

- Location within Saudi Arabia Location within Middle East Location within West and Central Asia
- 28°22′58″N 36°33′24″E
- Location: Tabuk, Saudi Arabia

History
- Built: 1559; 467 years ago

Site notes
- Current use: Museum
- Governing body: Ministry of Tourism
- Owner: Ministry of Tourism

Tabuk Castle (also known as Tabuk Fortress) (Arabic: قَلْعَة تَبُوْك, romanized: Qalʿat Tabūk; Ottoman Turkish: تبوق قلعه, Tabūq Qal‘ah) is a historic 16th-century castle located in Tabuk, the seat of Tabuk Province in northwestern Saudi Arabia. The castle dates back to 1559. It has been restored and converted into a museum, which is accessible to the public.

== History ==
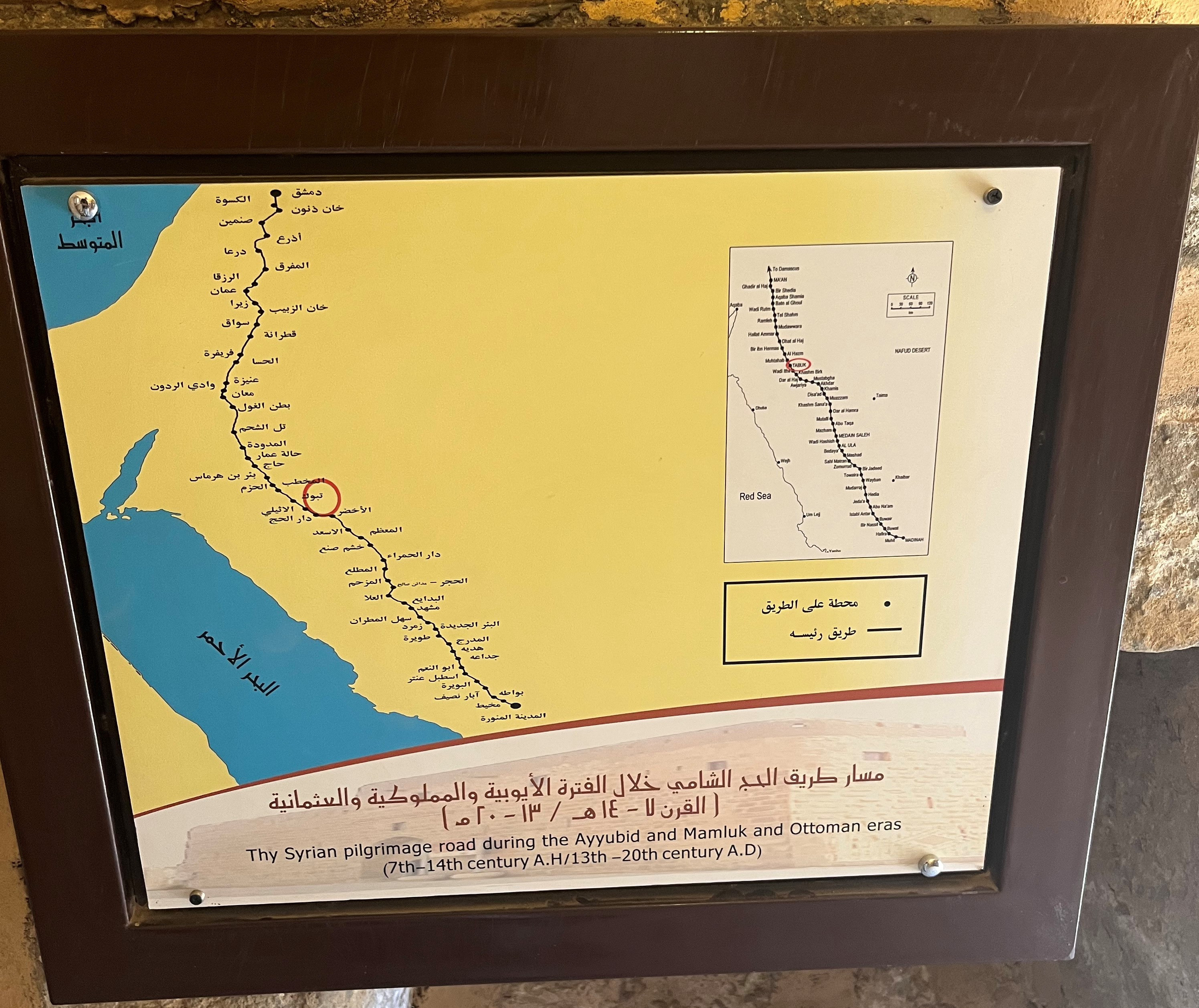
Display in Tabuk Castle (2022)

The existing fortress dates back to 1559 during the Ottoman period. It was built to protect the water station and served as a security and surveillance post. It was also one of the stations established for pilgrims traveling along the Hajj route connecting the Levant with Medina via the Syrian route.

Restoration work was carried out during the reign of Mehmed IV (r. 1648–1687), including the addition of decorative ceramic tiles that remain visible at the entrance. A major renovation took place in 1844 under Abdülmecid I, marked by a commemorative inscription placed in the mosque's mihrab. Further restoration occurred in 1950 during the Saudi era, followed by a comprehensive renovation in 1992 overseen by the Ministry of Education's Antiquities and Museums Agency.

Currently, the castle is overseen by the Ministry of Tourism, which is responsible for its preservation as a key cultural and historical site.

== Structure ==
The castle consists of two stories connected by a stairway and encompassing a mosque and various rooms where the second floor involves an open mosque.

== See also ==
- Hejaz
- List of museums in Saudi Arabia
