= Tabuk, Saudi Arabia =

Capital of Tabuk Province, Saudi Arabia

Tabuk تبوك
- City
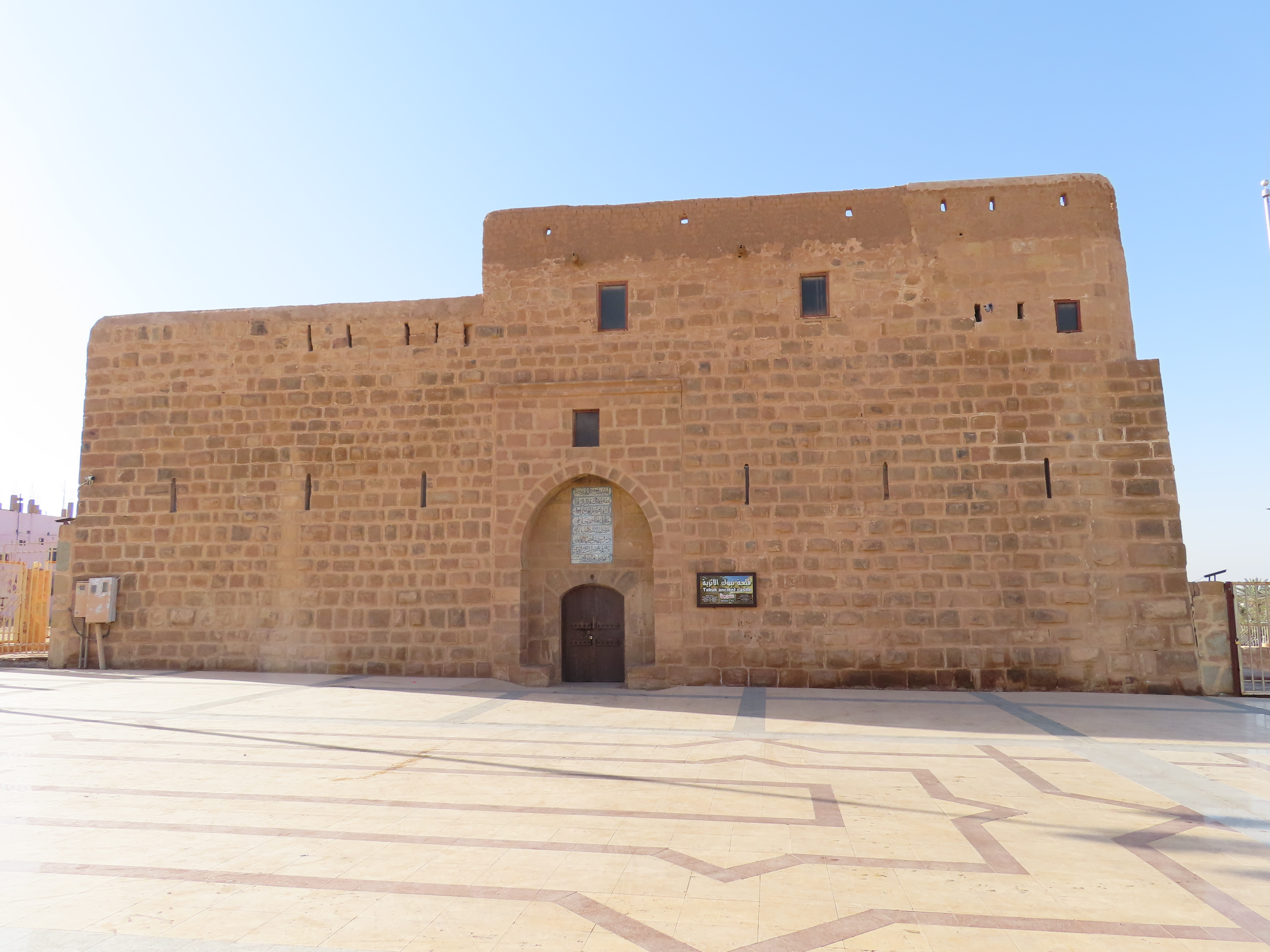
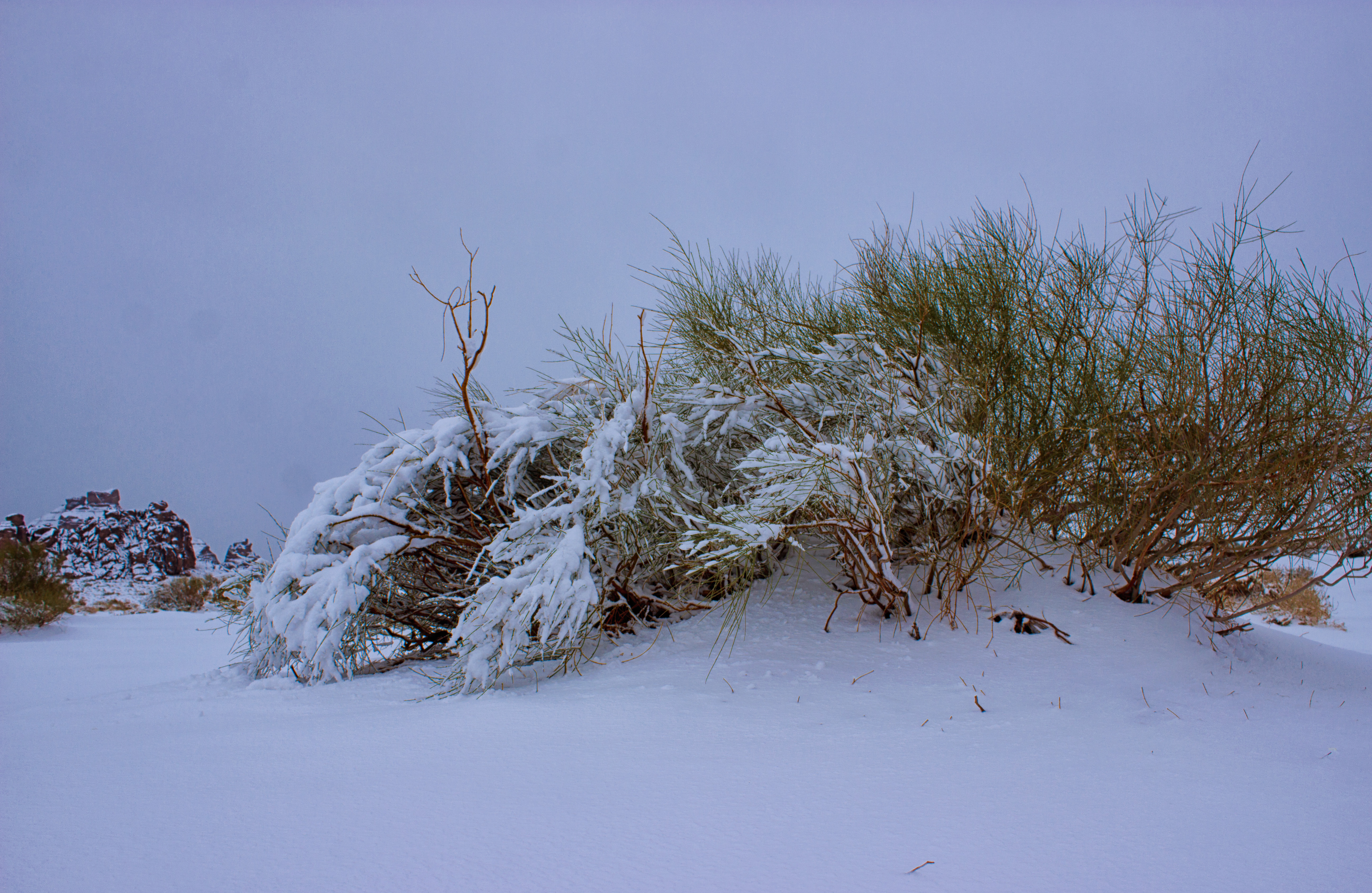
- Tabuk Castle Snow in the Midian Mountains

- Location of Tabuk within Tabuk Province

- Location in Saudi Arabia Tabuk (Near East) Tabuk (West and Central Asia)
- Coordinates: 28°23′50″N 36°34′44″E
- Country: Saudi Arabia
- Province: Tabuk Province
- Region: Hejaz

Government
  - Type: Municipality
  - Body: Tabuk Municipality

Population (2022 census)
  - City: 594,350
  - Metro: 623,665 (administrative center)

GDP (PPP, constant 2015 values)
  - Year: 2023
  - Total (Metro): $29.6 billion
  - Per capita: $43,100
- Time zone: UTC+03:00 (SAST)
- Area code: 014

Tabuk (Arabic: تَبُوك Tabūk, Arabic: [taˈbuːk]) is a city in northwestern Saudi Arabia, and the capital of Tabuk Province. It is located near the Jordan–Saudi Arabia border.

== History and prehistory ==
The 1068 Near East earthquakes were a pair of major earthquakes that occurred in 1068; the first of which whose epicentre was in the area of Tabuk.

Tabuk Province is rich in antiquities and archaeological sites such as petroglyphs, inscriptions, forts, palaces, sections of the Syrian and Egyptian pilgrimage (Hajj) routes, as well as remains of the Hejaz railway, an important station of which is located in Tabuk.

Hundreds of localities with rock art and inscriptions dating to different archaeological periods ranging from the Paleolithic to the Islamic period were recorded at Wadi Dam and the region west of Tabuk. A study of the art revealed rich stylistic variability with representations of both human and animal figures. Numerous sites in the area with Thamudic, Greek and Nabataean inscriptions have been found.

The ancient region of Midian roughly corresponds to what is now the Tabuk Province. According to tradition, a fortified place belonging to the Aṣ-ḥāb al-Aykah ("Companions of the Wood"), the term used in the Quran for the Midianites, is identified with Tabuk or even its fort, although the extant one is less than five centuries old.

2nd-century Alexandrine geographer Ptolemy mentioned a place by the name 'Tabawa', at the northwestern corner of Arabia. This name may be a reference to 'Tabuka' or 'Tabuk'. If this is true, the town may be as old as Ptolemy's time. Pre-Islamic Arab poets such as Antra and Nabiqa mention the mountain 'Hasmi' in their poems.

Tabuk became famous for the Expedition of Tabuk in 630, during the period of the Islamic prophet Muhammad. Since then, it remained a gateway to North Arabia.

Ain Sukkrah is an ancient ‘ayn (Arabic: عَيْن, romanized: spring) dating back to Pre-Islamic Arabia ("Era of Ignorance"). It is remembered that Muhammad camped for more than ten days near the spring during the expedition of Tabuk, and drank from its water.

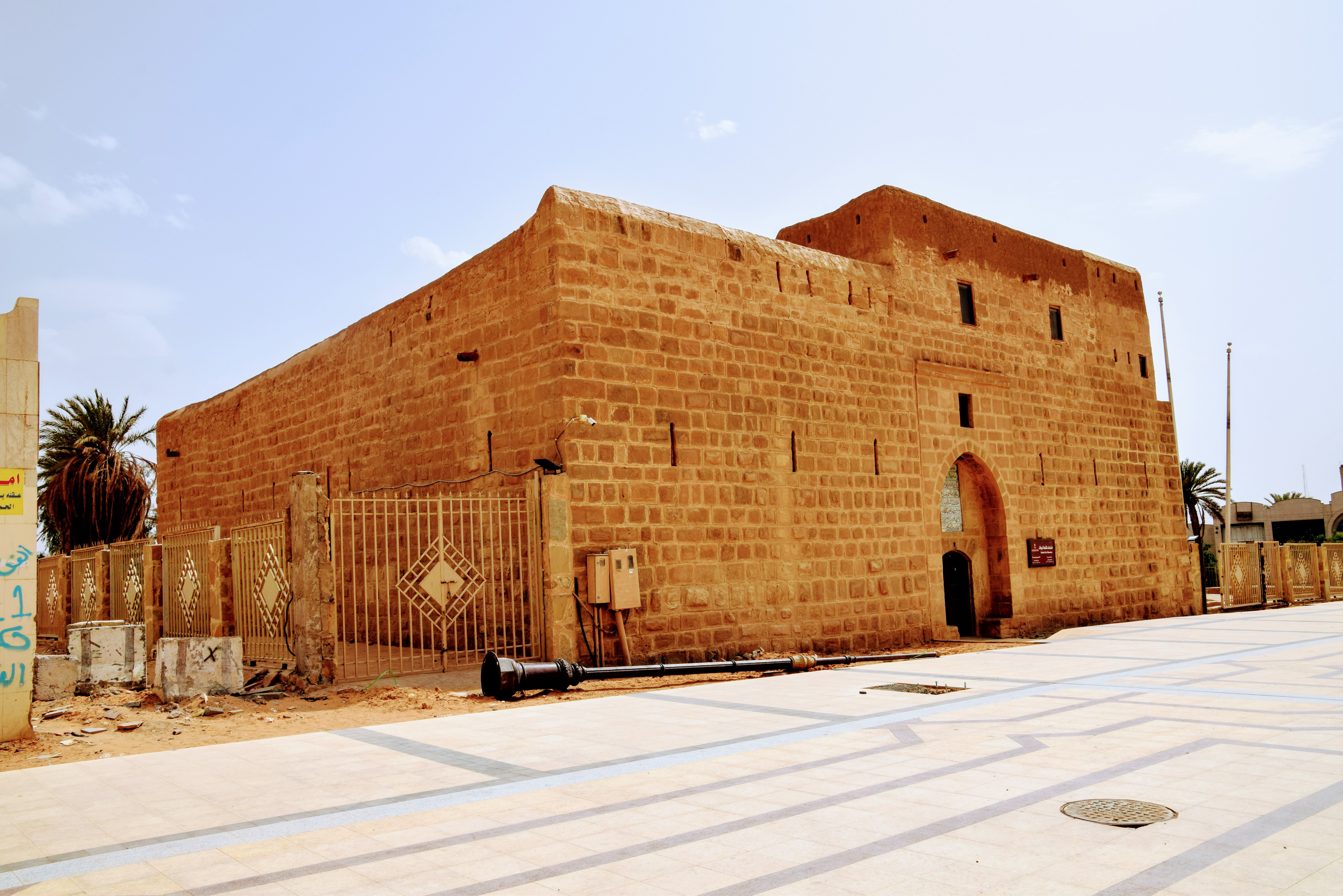
The 16th-century Ottoman Hajj fort

The Hajj fort of Tabuk seen today dates back to the 16th century, during the Ottoman period and has been restored many times since. Several forts and stations were built along the Syrian Hajj (pilgrimage) route, from Damascus to Medina, to welcome and protect the pilgrims performing the Hajj. The fort consists of two floors built around an open courtyard with a mosque, a well, and a stairway leading to the watch towers used by the guards. The Tabuk fort is considered a historical landmark of the region and is open to visitors.

Tabuk was visited by Charles Montagu Doughty in 1877.

Tabuk was captured by the Arab forces in 1918, three weeks after the British capture of Damascus.

Tabuk became a centre of military activity during the 1991 Gulf War as the city faced threats from Iraqi Scud missiles and air attacks.

== Education ==
=== University of Tabuk ===
The University of Tabuk (UT) was established in 2006 as part of a national effort to expand higher-education access across the Kingdom. Since its founding, the university has grown to include multiple colleges and specialized research centers, offering undergraduate and graduate programs in fields such as Medicine, Engineering, Business Administration, Computer Science, and Education.

UT also operates several branch campuses across the province, including in Umluj, Haql, Tayma, and Duba, providing educational opportunities to students outside the city of Tabuk.

=== Other Universities and Institutions ===
Tabuk is home to additional higher-education institutions, most notably Fahd bin Sultan University (FBSU), a private university offering programs in Engineering, Business, Computer Science, and Humanities. The province also hosts a branch of the Saudi Electronic University, offering flexible online and on-campus bachelor's and graduate programs.

=== Technical and Vocational Education ===
Technical and vocational training in Tabuk Province is overseen by the Technical and Vocational Training Corporation (TVTC). Institutions for male students include Tabuk Technical College, Umluj Technical College, Haql Technical College, Al-Wajh Technical College, and branches in Tayma and Duba. For female students, the Technical College for Girls in Tabuk provides diploma programs and vocational training in a range of technical and administrative fields.

=== General Education ===
Public schools in Tabuk—covering elementary, intermediate, and secondary levels—operate under the supervision of the Ministry of Education, serving communities throughout the province.

== Geography and climate ==
Climate data for Tabuk (1991–2020)
Month	Jan	Feb	Mar	Apr	May	Jun	Jul	Aug	Sep	Oct	Nov	Dec	Year
Record high °C (°F)	28 (82)	29 (84)	35 (95)	37 (99)	41 (106)	42 (108)	44 (111)	44 (111)	41 (106)	38 (100)	33 (91)	28 (82)	44 (111)
Mean daily maximum °C (°F)	17.7 (63.9)	20.6 (69.1)	24.9 (76.8)	29.5 (85.1)	33.8 (92.8)	36.9 (98.4)	38.2 (100.8)	38.7 (101.7)	36.1 (97.0)	31.1 (88.0)	23.8 (74.8)	18.9 (66.0)	29.2 (84.5)
Daily mean °C (°F)	10.5 (50.9)	13.1 (55.6)	17.3 (63.1)	21.8 (71.2)	26.2 (79.2)	29.3 (84.7)	30.9 (87.6)	31.2 (88.2)	28.4 (83.1)	23.4 (74.1)	16.7 (62.1)	11.7 (53.1)	21.7 (71.1)
Mean daily minimum °C (°F)	3.3 (37.9)	5.3 (41.5)	8.7 (47.7)	12.9 (55.2)	17.0 (62.6)	20.0 (68.0)	22.0 (71.6)	22.2 (72.0)	19.3 (66.7)	15.1 (59.2)	9.6 (49.3)	4.7 (40.5)	13.3 (56.0)
Record low °C (°F)	−7 (19)	−7 (19)	−4 (25)	0 (32)	7 (45)	11 (52)	15 (59)	15 (59)	10 (50)	5 (41)	−3 (27)	−6 (21)	−7 (19)
Average precipitation mm (inches)	9.1 (0.36)	2.3 (0.09)	4.4 (0.17)	1.2 (0.05)	1.8 (0.07)	0.1 (0.00)	0.1 (0.00)	0.8 (0.03)	0.1 (0.00)	2.9 (0.11)	3.3 (0.13)	1.7 (0.07)	27.8 (1.09)
Average precipitation days (≥ 1.0 mm)	1.0	0.7	0.8	0.3	0.5	0.0	0.0	0.1	0.0	0.7	0.5	0.4	5.0
Average relative humidity (%)	51	42	35	27	24	22	22	24	27	34	43	51	34
Average dew point °C (°F)	0 (32)	−1 (30)	0 (32)	0 (32)	2 (36)	4 (39)	6 (43)	7 (45)	6 (43)	5 (41)	3 (37)	1 (34)	3 (37)
Mean monthly sunshine hours	263.5	251.4	282.1	282.0	300.7	348.0	368.9	347.2	306.0	288.3	252.0	244.9	3,535
Mean daily sunshine hours	8.5	8.9	9.1	9.4	9.7	11.6	11.9	11.2	10.2	9.3	8.4	7.9	9.7
Source 1: World Meteorological Organization, Jeddah Regional Climate Center (humidity 1985-2010) (Red Sea International Airport)
Source 2: Deutscher Wetterdienst (sun 1986-1990), Time and Date (dewpoints, 1985-2015)

== Transportation ==
=== Air ===
Prince Sultan International Airport serves as the primary airport for the city, offering both domestic and international flights that connect Tabuk to major destinations across Saudi Arabia (such as Riyadh and Jeddah) and abroad.

== See also ==
- Provinces of Saudi Arabia
- List of governorates of Saudi Arabia
- List of cities and towns in Saudi Arabia
- Hejaz Mountains
