= Al-Ukhaydir, Tabuk Province =

Al-Ukhaydir
- Tabuk Province, Saudi Arabia
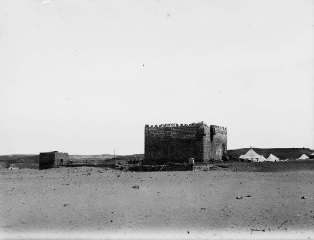
- The fort in 1907

Site information
- Controlled by: Saudi Arabia
- Condition: Well-preserved

Location
- Location within Saudi Arabia
- Coordinates: 28.091633°N 37.125917°E
- Length: 20 by 20 meters (66 ft × 66 ft)

Site history
- Built: 1531
- Built by: Turabay ibn Qaraja

Al-Ukhaydir (Arabic: الأخيضر; also spelled al-Akhthar, al-Akhdar, al-Akhider, Akhizer), also known as Haydar or Aqabat, is a site in the Tabuk Province in Saudi Arabia, located southeast of Tabuk. During early Ottoman rule, a fort, Qal'at al-Akhdar, was built at the site, part of the larger network of fortifications along the Hajj caravan route to Medina and Mecca.

== Etymology ==
The fort's name al-Ukhaydir is Arabic for "the small green place". According to archaeologist Andrew Petersen, the exact origin of the name is unclear. A likely possibility is that it was linked to the tradition of Elijah, who is commonly identified by Levantine Muslims as al-Khadr. Al-Khadr is also the subject of local Arabian legend. The association with al-Khadr was mentioned by travelers and visiting historians throughout the Ottoman era (1517–1917) and a shrine dedicated to al-Khadr was situated within the fort's walls.

Petersen suggests that "the name may reflect the greenness of this site, in an area of overwhelming aridity". Historian Richard Blackburn also relates that the "sparse greenery thereabouts is said to account" for its name, "little green place or Wadi al-Ukhaydir (slightly green valley)".

== Location ==
Al-Ukhaydir is located south of Tabuk in the Tabuk Province of Saudi Arabia. It was a midway point in the Syria–Hejaz route, being 760 kilometers (470 mi) south of Damascus and 560 kilometers (350 mi) north of Medina. It is situated on sandy grounds in a deep gorge surrounded by rocky slopes, partly covered by lava.

== History ==
Al-Ukhaydir is first clearly mentioned in the early 13th century, during Ayyubid rule, by Syrian geographer Yaqut al-Hamawi, who noted that the Islamic prophet Muhammad prayed at the site on his way to Tabuk in 630. A mosque was built at the place where he prayed, which was located in the center of a wadi (dry riverbed) called "Wadi al-Ukhaydir". The 14th-century traveler Ibn Batuta remarked that Wadi al-Ukhaydir was isolated in the wilderness and referred to it as a "valley of hell" where many Hajj pilgrims had died one year because of a water shortage at the site. Moreover, he recorded that the story of the deadly episode had been inscribed on a rock at the site by one of the pilgrims.

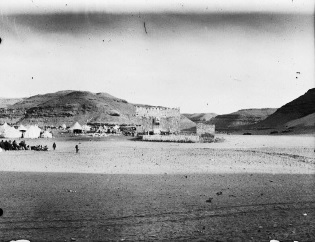
A view of the fort from the southeast, with the Hejaz mountains in the background and Bedouin encampments immediately to the west of the fort, 1907

The Ottoman Empire conquered Hejaz, including al-Ukhaydir, from the Mamluks by 1517. Not long before then, a reservoir had been built at al-Ukhaydir, because in 1517 an anonymous source described intertribal fighting at the pool, which rendered it unusable by the Hajj pilgrims that year. As an unprotected rest stop and watering place on the Hajj route from Damascus to Medina, the Ottomans sought to fortify the site, along with numerous others throughout the 16th century. A particularly urgent reason to fortify al-Ukhaydir was due to the poisoning of its reservoir with colocynth by a certain Mulhim, the chieftain of the Bedouin tribe of Banu Lam al-Mafarija, in 1530. Mulhim continued to sabotage the Hajj caravan's rest stops until being defeated by the pilgrim caravan at al-Mu'azzam at significant loss of life to the pilgrims.

To prevent recurrent sabotage by the Bedouin, including Mafarija and Bani 'Uqbah, Sultan Sulayman the Magnificent decreed the construction of a fort at al-Ukhaydir in 1531/32. Accordingly, the governor of Damascus, Mustafa Ablaq Pasha, commanded the Lajjun-based Arab strongman, Turabay ibn Qaraja, to build a fort at the site, which was completed in forty days. Twenty local Janissaries from Damascus were regularly posted at al-Ukhaydir, and a tax on pilgrims' goods was collected at the fort to contribute to the troops' wages.

In 1672, the Turkish traveler Evliya Celebi visited al-Ukhaydir and described it as a strongly-built, square building with a mosque, enough rooms to house forty soldiers, a separate room for the Janissary commander, twelve long cannons and a reservoir was supplied by three channels. Celebi also noted that the site and its vicinity was inhabited by Bedouin from the Haydari Sufi order who claimed their ancestor, Ali Haydar al-Qarrar, built a fort at the site in 667 CE. Based on 20th-century excavations at the site, archaeologist Andrew Petersen concludes that a fort pre-dating the Ottomans likely existed at the site. Celebi further noted that the fort had been previously restored by a Damascene official named Haydar Pasha. The Sufi traveler Abd al-Ghani al-Nabulsi also noted the fort's strength and claimed it was named "al-Ukhaydir" after the Muslim holy figure of al-Khadr (identified with Elijah), who according to legend, dug the fort's well, which contained high-quality water. In the early 18th century, al-Ukhaydir was controlled by the Bani Manjak tribe. Further religious association to the site was reported by the Turkish traveler Mehmed Edib in the late 18th century, including that Ali Haydar's tomb was located there and was a pilgrimage site for Bedouin tribesmen and that it was the place where Job was covered with insects which were turned into stones.

The viceroy of Egypt, Muhammad Ali Pasha, had al-Ukhaydir inspected in 1825 and according to his engineers' report, the fort was in good condition and contained three functioning cisterns and one cistern in need of repair. In Charles Doughty's description of the site in 1875, he noted that there was a shrine within the fort dedicated to Elijah (i.e. al-Khader to Muslims) and a large cistern outside the fort's wall which was supplied by a well within the walls. He also mentioned that there were huts around the fort inhabited by local cultivators of "camel knot-grass" under the Ottoman garrison's protection.

=== Modern era ===
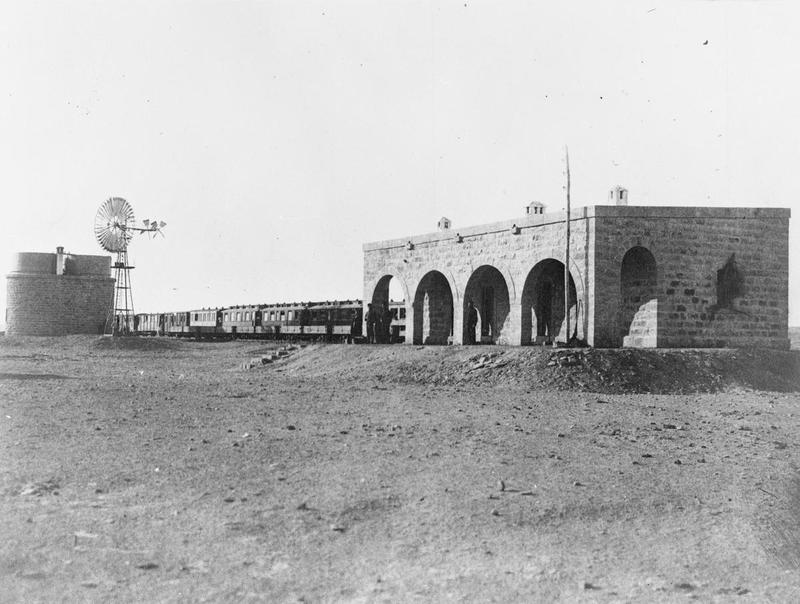
The Hejaz Railway station at al-Ukhaydir, 1916 or 1917

In 1906, the Hejaz Railway, which was established partly to replace the traditional Hajj caravan route, was extended to al-Ukhaydir. Al-Ukhaydir was the southernmost point in the Hejaz where Christians were permitted by the Ottoman Empire to travel. Thus, construction of the remainder of the line south of al-Ukhaydir was overseen by Egyptian engineers, rather than many of the Europeans who were used for the northern line of the railway.

By 1907, the fort was being used as a telegraph station with three operators. That year, French archaeologists A. Jaussen and R. Savignac carried out the first major excavation at al-Ukhaydir, producing photos, site plans and Arabic inscription squeezes. They also identified an old mosque 400–500 meters north of the fort, which they claimed was the mosque Yaqut al-Hamawi associated with Muhammad centuries earlier. At the time, local Arabs continued to inhabit the area, cultivating camel fodder and serving the garrison.

== Architecture ==
The fort at al-Ukhaydir, built from dressed stone, was one of the smallest on the Hajj route. The square structure measured roughly 20 meters (66 ft) on each side and consisted of three stories, topped by crenelated battlements. Its arched gateway was on the northern end, and on top of it was a projecting, cube-shaped machicolation laying on four, two-tier corbels. At the ground floor there were at least eight gun slits, two of them on either side of the machicolation, a projecting turret on the northeastern corner of the fort, one immediately east of the gateway, two on the west wall and two on the southern wall. The upper floor had a few gun slits as well. Towers are situated at the southwest and northeast corners of the fort. There were six cisterns inside the fort, all but the westernmost one of which were connected to each other. The largest cistern was 19 by 10 meters (62 ft × 33 ft) and the smallest was 3 by 3 meters (9.8 ft × 9.8 ft). Northwest of the fort was a smaller, ruined, square structure with a gate at its southern side, overlooking the fort's largest cistern.

== See also ==
- Al-Ukhaidir Fortress (Iraq)
- List of castles in Saudi Arabia

== Bibliography ==
- Bakhit, Muhammad Adnan (1982). The Ottoman Province of Damascus in the Sixteenth Century. Beirut: Librairie du Liban. p. 109. ISBN 9780866853224.
- Petersen, Andrew (2012). The Medieval and Ottoman Hajj Route in Jordan: An Archaeological and Historical Study. Council for British Research in the Levant. ISBN 978-1842175026.
