= Results of the 2013 Jordanian general election =

Early parliamentary elections were held in Jordan on 23 January 2013. All 150 seats in the House of Representatives were up for election. Voter turnout was reported to be 56.6%.

== Election results ==
Of the 150 available seats, 15 seats were reserved for women, 9 for Christians, 9 for Bedouins, 3 for Chechen or Circassian candidates. A further 27 seats were chosen on the national level, rather than on a constituency basis. The final results of the elections were available on 28 January 2013. More than 90 of the 150 chosen Representatives were new to the House of Representatives. It was reported that a total of 37 Representatives can be seen as Islamist or critical of the government.

=== Ajloun Governorate ===
Ajloun Governorate (2 Districts, 4 Seats)

First District

Representative	Affiliation/ Party	Seat Status
Kamal Zghoul		Muslim
Ali Bani Ata		Muslim
Rida Haddad		Christian

Second District

Representative	Affiliation/ Party	Seat Status
Mohammad Freihat		Muslim

=== Amman Governorate ===
Amman Governorate (7 Districts, 25 Seats)

First District

Representative	Affiliation/ Party	Seat Status
Khalil Atiyeh		Muslim
Mohammad Barayseh		Muslim
Hayel Daaja		Muslim
Ahmad Jaloudi		Muslim
Talal al-Sharif		Muslim

Second District

Representative	Affiliation/ Party	Seat Status
Raed Kouz		Muslim
Mohammad Khalil Dawaimeh		Muslim
Yihya Saud		Muslim
Mohammad Mahseiri		Muslim
Yousef Qorneh		Muslim

Third District

Representative	Affiliation/ Party	Seat Status
Amjad Maslamani		Muslim
Amer Bashir		Muslim
Abdul Rahim Biqaai		Muslim
Ahmad Safadi		Muslim
Atef Qaawar		Christian

Fourth District

Representative	Affiliation/ Party	Seat Status
Ahmad Hmeisat		Muslim
Kheirallah Abu Saalik		Muslim
Assaf Shawabkah		Muslim

Fifth District

Representative	Affiliation/ Party	Seat Status
Mariam Lozi		Muslim
Mousa Abu Sweilem		Muslim
Tamer Bino		Circassian and Chechen

Sixth District

Representative	Affiliation/ Party	Seat Status
Nassar Qaisi		Muslim
Abdul Jalil Zyoud		Muslim
Kheir Eddin Hakouz		Circassian and Chechen

Seventh District

Representative	Affiliation/ Party	Seat Status
Adnan Ajarmeh		Muslim

=== Aqaba Governorate ===
Aqaba Governorate (1 Districts, 2 Seats)

First District

Representative	Affiliation/ Party	Seat Status
Mohammad Badri		Muslim
Mohammad Riyati		Muslim

=== Balqa Governorate ===
Balqa Governorate ( 4 Districts, 10 Seats)

First District

Representative	Affiliation/ Party	Seat Status
Khaled Hiari		Muslim
Nidal Hiari		Muslim
Mohammad Abbadi		Muslim
Mahmoud Kharabsheh		Muslim
Bassam Khalifa		Muslim
Dirar Daoud		Christian
Jamal Gammoh		Christian

Second District

Representative	Affiliation/ Party	Seat Status
Shadi Odwan		Muslim

Third District

Representative	Affiliation/ Party	Seat Status
Mohammad Alaqmeh		Muslim

Fourth District

Representative	Affiliation/ Party	Seat Status
Mustafa Yaghi		Muslim

=== Irbid Governorate ===
Irbid Governorate (9 Districts, 16 Seats)

First District

Representative	Affiliation/ Party	Seat Status
Samir Oweis		Muslim
Salim Batayneh		Muslim
Mohammad Radaideh		Muslim
Qassim Bani Hani		Muslim
Abdul Munim Odat		Muslim

Second District

Representative	Affiliation/ Party	Seat Status
Mohammad Khasawneh		Muslim
Husni Sheyab		Muslim
Jamil Nimri		Christian

Third District

Representative	Affiliation/ Party	Seat Status
ِMohammad Sharman		Muslim

Fourth District

Representative	Affiliation/ Party	Seat Status
Abdul Karim Darayseh		Muslim
Fawaz Zu’bi		Muslim

Fifth District

Representative	Affiliation/ Party	Seat Status
Abdullah Obeidat		Muslim
Bassel Malkawi		Muslim

Sixth District

Representative	Affiliation/ Party	Seat Status
Yassin Bani Yassin		Muslim

Seventh District

Representative	Affiliation/ Party	Seat Status
Khaled Bakkar		Muslim

Eighth District

Representative	Affiliation/ Party	Seat Status
Bassel Alawneh		Muslim

Ninth District

Representative	Affiliation/ Party	Seat Status
Mahmoud Mheidat		Muslim

=== Jerash Governorate ===
Jerash Governorate (1 District, 4 Seats)

First District

Representative	Affiliation/ Party	Seat Status
Abdullah Khawaldeh		Muslim
Mefleh Ruheimi		Muslim
Mohammad Hdeib		Muslim
Wafaa Bani Mustafa		Muslim

=== Karak Governorate ===
Karak Governorate (6 Districts, 10 Seats)

First District

Representative	Affiliation/ Party	Seat Status
Mwafaq Dmour		Muslim
Taha Shorafa		Muslim
Faris Halaseh		Christian

Second District

Representative	Affiliation/ Party	Seat Status
Eteiwi Majali		Muslim
Raed Hijazin		Christian

Third District

Representative	Affiliation/ Party	Seat Status
Bassam Btoush		Muslim
Madallah Tarawneh		Muslim

Fourth District

Representative	Affiliation/ Party	Seat Status
Mahmoud Hweimel		Muslim

Fifth District

Representative	Affiliation/ Party	Seat Status
Mustafa Rawashdeh		Muslim

Sixth District

Representative	Affiliation/ Party	Seat Status
Nayef Leimoun		Muslim

=== Ma'an Governorate ===
Ma'an Governorate (3 Districts, 4 Seats)

First District

Representative	Affiliation/ Party	Seat Status
Amjad Al Khattab		Muslim
Awad Kreishan		Muslim

Second District

Representative	Affiliation/ Party	Seat Status
Bader Toura		Muslim

Third District

Representative	Affiliation/ Party	Seat Status
Adnan Farajat		Muslim

=== Madaba Governorate ===
Madaba Governorate (2 Districts, 4 Seats)

First District

Representative	Affiliation/ Party	Seat Status
Adnan Abu Rukbeh		Muslim
Zaid Shawabkah		Muslim
Mustafa Hamarneh		Christian

Second District

Representative	Affiliation/ Party	Seat Status
Ali Sneid		Muslim

=== Mafraq Governorate ===
Mafraq Governorate (1 District, 4 Seats)

First District

Representative	Affiliation/ Party	Seat Status
Abdul Karim Dughmi		Muslim
Mefleh Khazaaleh		Muslim
Nayef Khazaaleh		Muslim
Mohammad Shdeifat		Muslim

=== Tafilah Governorate ===
Tafilah Governorate (2 Districts, 4 Seats)

First District

Representative	Affiliation/ Party	Seat Status
Ibrahim Shahahdeh		Muslim
Ibrahim Eteiwi		Muslim
Mohammad Qatatsheh		Muslim

Second District

Representative	Affiliation/ Party	Seat Status
Mohammad Saudi		Muslim

=== Zarqa Governorate ===
Zarqa Governorate (5 Districts, 11 Seats)

First District

Representative	Affiliation/ Party	Seat Status
Samir Orabi		Muslim
Krayem Awadat		Muslim
Yousef Abu Huweidi		Muslim
Mirza Bollad		Circassian and Chechen
Tareq Khouri		Christian

Second District

Representative	Affiliation/ Party	Seat Status
Mohammad Yousef Dawaimeh		Muslim
Ali Khalaileh		Muslim
Mousa Khalaileh		Muslim

Third District

Representative	Affiliation/ Party	Seat Status
Wasfi Zyoud		Muslim

Fourth District

Representative	Affiliation/ Party	Seat Status
Mohammad Thahrawi		Muslim
Qusai Dmeisi		Muslim

=== Northern Badia ===
Northern Badia ( 3 Seats)

Representative	Affiliation/ Party	Seat Status
Habes Shabeeb		Muslim
Saad Hayel Srour		Muslim
Deifallah Bani Khaled		Muslim

=== Central Badia ===
Central Badia ( 3 Seats)

Representative	Affiliation/ Party	Seat Status
Sleiman Zaben		Muslim
Thamer Fayez		Muslim
Hadithah Khreisha		Muslim

=== Southern Badia ===
Southern Badia ( 3 Seats)

Representative	Affiliation/ Party	Seat Status
Mohammad Hajaya		Muslim
Saad Zawaideh		Muslim
Deifallah Saeedin		Muslim

=== Women's Quota ===
Women's Quota (15 Seats, 1 woman per previous constituency)

Representative	Affiliation/ Party	Seat Status	Governorate/ District
Naayem Eiadat		Woman	Amman
Fatima Abu Abtah		Woman	Irbid
Amneh Ghawaair		Woman	Balqa
Hamdiyeh Qwaidar		Woman	Karak
Faten Khleifat		Woman	Ma'an
Rudaina Ati		Woman	Zarqa
Reem Abu Dalbouh		Woman	Mafraq
Insaf Khawaldeh		Woman	Tafilah
Falak Jamani		Woman	Madaba
Najah Azzeh		Woman	Jerash
Kholoud Khatatbeh		Woman	Ajloun
Tamam Riyati		Woman	Aqaba
Miasar Sardiyeh		Woman	Northern Badia
Hind Fayez		Woman	Central Badia
Shaha Abu Shosheh		Woman	Southern Badia

=== National List ===
National List (the following candidates were chosen as part of a national list rather than a constituency or quota)

List	Seats	Representative(s)
Muslim Centre Party	3	Mohammad Al Haj, Mustafa Amawi, Zakariya Sheikh
StrongerJordan	2	Rula Hroub, Munir Zawaideh
The Homeland	2	Atef Tarawneh, Khamis Atiyeh
National Union Party	2	Mohammad Khashman, Abdul Majid Aqtash
National Current Party	1	Abdul Hadi Majali
Salvation	1	Ahmad Rqeibat
Labour and Professionalism	1	Mazen Dalaeen
Cooperation	1	Mejhem Sqour
Dignity	1	Ali Zanazneh
Unified Front	1	Amjad Majali
National Unity	1	Mohammad Zboun
Construction	1	Hassan Obeidat
The People	1	Mustafa Shneikat
People of Determination	1	Raed Khalaileh
Free Voice	1	Faisal Aawar
Voice of the Nation	1	Haitham Abbadi
National Labour	1	Abdul Hadi Maharmeh
Al Quds	1	Mohammad Amr
Al Bayareq	1	Hamzeh Akhu Rashideh
The Dawn	1	Saad Bluwi
Shabab Al Wifaq	1	Motaz Abu Rumman
Citizenship	1	Hazem Qashou

== See also ==
- 2013 Jordanian general election
- Jordanian parliamentary election results, 2007

== Literature ==
- Bank, André; Sunik, Anna (2014). "Parliamentary Elections in Jordan, January 23, 2013". Electoral Studies. 34: 376–379. doi:10.1016/j.electstud.2013.08.012.
