= Robert Vere Buxton =

English cricketer, soldier, and banker

Robert Vere Buxton DSO (29 April 1883 – 1 October 1953), known as Robin Buxton, was an English cricketer, soldier and banker.

Buxton was born in Belgravia, London, a son of Francis Buxton, Liberal Member of Parliament, barrister and banker. He was educated at Eton and Trinity College, Oxford.

He was a first-class cricketer. He was in the Eton XI of 1902, scoring 3 and 74 against Harrow. At Oxford he played in the University Match with Cambridge, scored 33 and 28, and received his Blue in 1906. In 1906 and 1907, he played a few times for Middlesex.

Buxton served in the Sudan Civil Service, 1907–11. He then joined Martins Bank, becoming a director in 1913.

In November 1911, Buxton was commissioned in the West Kent (Queen's Own) Yeomanry in the Territorial Force. During the First World War, he served as a captain in the West Kent Yeomanry before he was seconded to the Imperial Camel Corps in 1916. Serving in the Middle East, he became a colleague of T. E. Lawrence. In 1918, a long-distance raid to sever the Hejaz railway, was launched. On 24 July, Nos. 5 and 7 Companies of the Imperial Camel Corps Brigade commanded by Major Buxton, marched from the Suez Canal to arrive at Aqaba on 30 July. On 8 August 1918, the Imperial Camel Corps, supported by the Royal Air Force, seized the well-defended Hejaz railway station at Mudawwara. They captured a large number of Ottoman prisoners and two guns and destroyed the water towers, but suffered 17 casualties in the operation. Buxton's two companies of Imperial Camel Corps continued on towards Amman, where they hoped to destroy the main bridge. However 20 miles (32 km) from the city they were attacked by aircraft, forcing them to withdraw; they eventually arrived at Beersheba on 6 September, a march of 700 miles (1,100 km) in 44 days.

He was awarded the DSO in 1919:

For gallant and successful services when in command of a flying column of Imperial Camel Corps operating in the Northern Hejaz. On August 8th, 1918, this column delivered a surprise attack on the strong Turkish post at Mudawara on the Hejaz Railway, 60 miles south of Maan. As a result the station was captured and destroyed, 35 Turks being killed and 150 prisoners captured. This operation – the success of which was largely due to Colonel Buxton's personal leadership and excellent dispositions – had the effect of completing the isolation of Medina and the Southern Hejaz garrisons from communication with the north.

He was also awarded the 3rd class of the Order of the Nile of Egypt and made an officer of the Order of the Crown of Italy. He was promoted to lieutenant colonel in October 1919.

After the war, Buxton returned to Martins Bank and his association with T. E. Lawrence continued as his banker and effectively the financier of the Subscribers' Edition of Seven Pillars of Wisdom. He was drawn by William Roberts for Seven Pillars of Wisdom. Buxton was invited to revise chapters of the book. From 1945, he was deputy chairman of Martins Bank and chairman of its London board.

He married Irene Marguerite Pix, widow of Sir Richard Levinge, 10th baronet, in 1916. He had no issue. He died in Itchen Abbas, Hampshire.
