= Abdallah Al-Jazi =

Jordanian politician

Abdallah Al Jazi

Minister of State of Jordan
- In office 1994–1995

Member of House of Representatives of Jordan
- In office 1997–2009

Vice Speaker of House of Representatives of Jordan
- In office 2008–2009

Personal details
- Born: 1954 (age 71–72) Udhruh, Ma'an, Jordan
- Died: 2014
- Education: Cairo University

Abdallah Al Jazi (Arabic: عبد الله هارون سحيمان الجازي) was a Jordanian politician and tribal leader of the large Howeitat. He served as Member of the House of Representatives of Jordan from 1997 to 2009, during which he was the Vice Speaker of the House of Representatives of Jordan. He has also been Minister of State.

== Education ==
Al Jazi graduated from the Faculty of Medicine of Cairo University in 1979.

== Career ==
=== Minister of State ===
Prior to his term in the Parliament, Al Jazi held various executive positions in the Government of Jordan. Between 1985 and 1987 he was the General Director of Jordan's Hejaz Railway, during which he was elected as the President of the Arab Union of Railways. Thereafter, he held the position of Secretary General of Post and Transport Ministry until he was appointed as the Minister of State in 1994 as part of the Government Cabinet that has signed the famous Israel–Jordan Treaty of Peace at Wadi Araba Crossing.

=== Member of the House of Representatives of Parliament ===
Al Jazi was a member of the House of Representatives of Jordan, he was elected as a Member of Parliament of Jordan for three successive parliamentary periods from 1997 until 2009 (the 13th, 14th and 15th Parliaments). During that he chaired the International and Arab Affairs Committee, Energy Committee, Jordan France Parliamentary Friendship Committee; additionally he was an active member of the Financial Committee.

=== Vice Speaker of the House of Representatives of Parliament ===
In the 15th Parliament he was elected by the MPs as the Vice Speaker of the House of Representatives of Jordan. His term in office was ended when Abdullah II of Jordan dissolved the House of Representatives of Jordan in November 2009.

=== Political Leadership ===
Al Jazi was engaged in Jordan's political parties affairs since 1989 until he died in 2014. He was the co-founder and one of the main leaders of the National Current Party. The National Current Party was the main rival to the Islamic Action Front, which is the Muslim Brotherhood’s political party in Jordan.

== Tribal Influence ==
Al Jazi was a tribal leader of the Howeitat tribe, which inhabit some of vast territories of Southern Jordan and Northern Saudi. He has been seen as the main political leader of the tribe.

== Personal life ==
Al Jazi was born in 1954 and died in 2014; he was married with four sons and two daughters.
