= Hadiyyah, Al Madinah =

- Hadiyah Railway bridge

General information
- Location: Medina Province, Saudi-Arabia
- Coordinates: 25°32′27″N 38°44′19″E
- Line: Historical Hejaz railway
Location

Hadiyah Railway Station building

Hadiyyah or Hadiya or Hedia was an Ottoman fortress, railway station and railway bridge on the historic Hejaz Railway in the Medina Province of Saudi Arabia. The site is included on Saudi Arabia's Tentative List for UNESCO World Heritage as part of the Hejaz Railway.

== History ==
Hadiyyah was the most important railway station on the historic Hejaz railway between Al-Ula and Medina. The famous overturned Hejaz locomotive, mistakenly associated with the sabotage of the Ottoman railway by Lawrence of Arabia, is located near the Station. The locomotive, a Krauss 0-6-0T steam locomotive, lies on its side, surrounded by scattered carriages. It was originally upright until it was toppled in the 1980s.

The 150 m long Hadiya Railway Bridge is located about one km north of the Station. Its 27 red-and-gray-brick arches, spanning wadi Khaybar, once linked a now dismantled single track from one bank to the other.

Remnants of an Ottoman fortress, mentioned by Ibn Battuta, can be found on a nearby hilltop overlooking the wadi.
