= Al Hafirah, Al Madinah =

Al Hafirah
- Village
- Location in Saudi Arabia
- Coordinates: 24°52′44″N 39°42′28″E
- Country: Saudi Arabia
- Province: Al Madinah Province
- Time zone: UTC+3 (EAT)
  - Summer (DST): UTC+3 (EAT)

Al Hafirah is a village in western Al Madinah Province, in western Saudi Arabia.

== See also ==
- Hajj: Hafirah is on traditional Syrian Hajj caravan route
- Hejaz railway: Hafirah has one of the Ottoman-period stations
- List of cities and towns in Saudi Arabia
- Regions of Saudi Arabia
