= Qal'at Mudawwara =

Desert castle in the South of Jordan

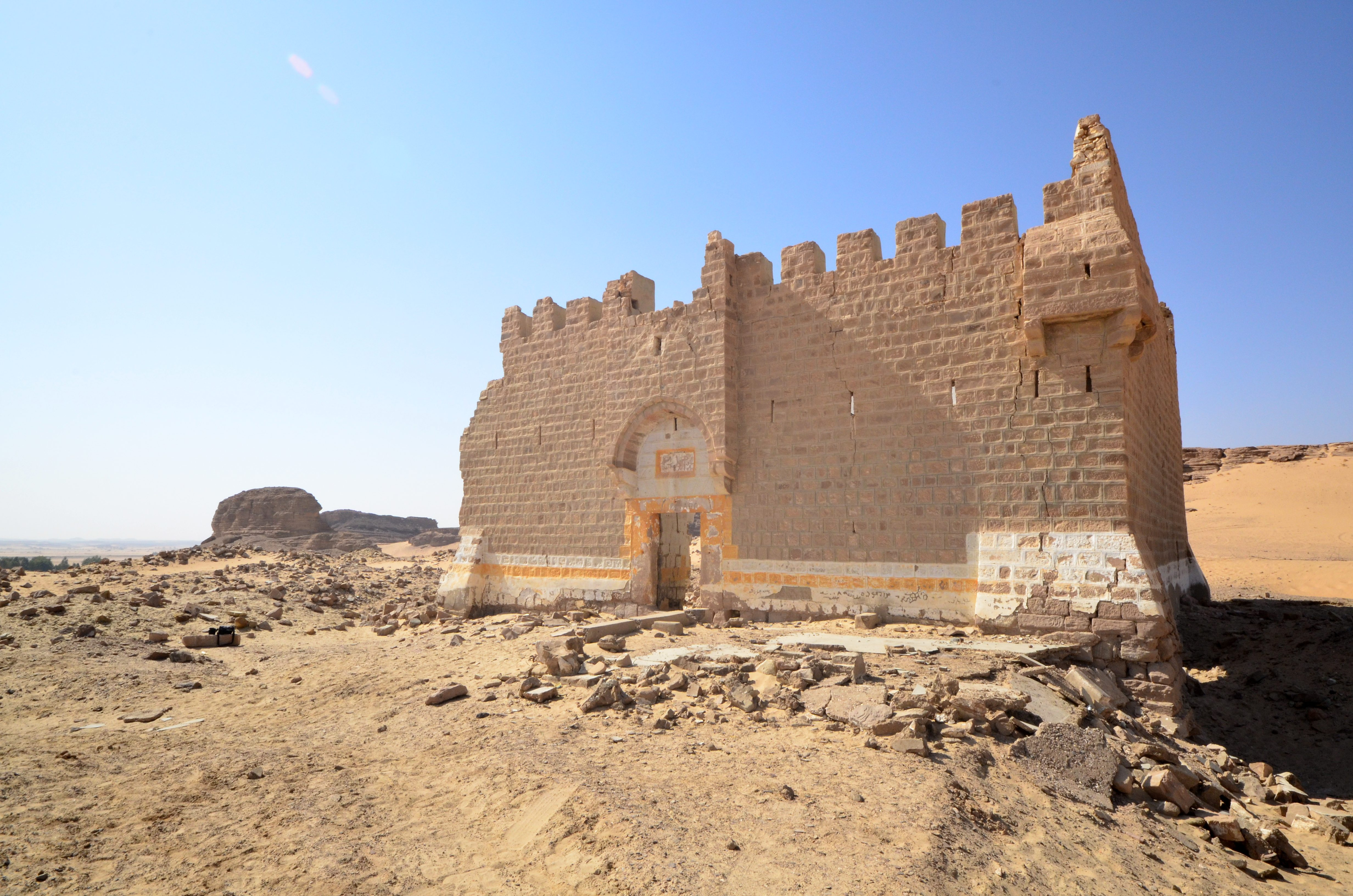
Al-Mudawara Castle, or Fort

Qal'at Mudawara, also Qal'at al-Mudawwara or Jagiman Castle, is a desert fort located near the Jordanian village of Al-Mudawara, 350 km south of Amman and 15 km from the Jordanian-Saudi border. It was used in the Mamluk and Ottoman eras as a stop for Hajj caravans, and is the last pilgrim station to Al-Shami before the start of the sandy plain in northern Hijaz.

== History ==
The first construction of this castle was during the period of the Arab prince Salama bin Fawaz bin Rashid Al-Mufarrajah Lami al-Ta’i, the leader of the Arab tribes in the region that is now Jordan, in the year 1495, i.e. the late Mamluk rule of southern Bilad al-Sham. Salama bin Fawaz was the leader of the Lam and Bani Uqba tribes and others that inhabited the Badia at that time.

There was no mention of the fort in the sources until the Ottomans rebuilt it during their period of rule, and Abdullah Pasha guided me to the governor of Damascus(AH 1142-1145 / AD 1730-1733). It is mentioned in the name of the fortress of Jogivan, which is the name known to the Bedouins to date, and the castle: Castle of Mudevira.

== Building ==
The castle is square-shaped with ribs length of 19 m, and the maximum height of the walls is 9 m. At the four corners of the fortress, pillars were constructed one meter above the floor, on which small towers were built. In its walls there are small open holes in two rows, and its northern and western walls have terraces. The walls are built of two types of stones, in which the upper parts differ from the lower parts, which reflects at least two periods in which the reconstruction was made, perhaps they are the difference between the first construction of the era of the Gezivan leader and the second by the Ottomans.

Entry to the castle is through a rectangular gate leading to a covered corridor with a barrel vault overlooking an inner courtyard measuring 8 x 8 m. The gate is surmounted by a large latch that stands out from the azimuth of the eastern wall, and measures 5.50 x 2.50 m. The ratchet has a front window and a narrow opening on each side. The central courtyard is surrounded by two-storey wings, each consisting of nine rooms, covered with barrel vaults. Ascending to the upper floor was carried out by two stone stairways erected on both sides of the corridor. Other features include a pond and a paved road.
