= Results of the 2007 Jordanian general election =

== Election results ==
The following are the official and final results for the Jordanian Parliamentary Elections held on Tuesday, November 20.

=== Ajlun Governorate (2 Districts, 4 Seats) ===
First District: Al-Qasabah.

Representative	Affiliation/ Party	Seat Status
Najeh Mohammad Al-Momani		Muslim
Mohammad Ta'mah Al-Qudah	IAF	Muslim
Reda Haddad		Christian

Second District: Kufranjeh.

Representative	Affiliation/ Party	Seat Status
Ayman Al-Shwayyat		Muslim

=== Amman Governorate (7 Districts, 23 Seats excluding Center Bedouins Seats) ===
First District: Basman, Marka, and Tariq.

Representative	Affiliation/ Party	Seat Status
Khalil Hussain Atyyeh		Muslim
Ja'afar Marwan Al-Abdallat		Muslim
Hassan Mahmoud Safi		Muslim
Azzam Al-Hunaidy	IAF	Muslim

Second District: Al-Yarmook, Al-Naser, Ras Al-Ain, and Badr.

Representative	Affiliation/ Party	Seat Status
Hamzah Mansour	IAF	Muslim
Mohammad Selmi Al-Kouz		Muslim
Mohammad Hussain Al-Kouz		Muslim
Yousef Ahmad Al-Qarnah		Muslim

Third District: Al-Madina, Zahran, and Al-Abdali.

Representative	Affiliation/ Party	Seat Status
Mamdooh Al-Abbadi		Muslim
Ahmad Al-Safadi		Muslim
Abdul Raheem Al-Beqa'i		Muslim
Yousif Al-Bustanji		Muslim
Tariq Khouri		Christian

Fourth District: Al-Quaismeh, Al-Jwaida, Abu Alanda, Khraibt Al-Sooq, Jawa, Al-yadoodah, Um Qsair, Al-Muqablain, Sahab, Al-Jeezah, and Al-Muaqqar.

Representative	Affiliation/ Party	Seat Status
Khalaf Al-Rakkad		Muslim
Hamad Abu Zaid		Muslim
Nedal Barjas Al-Hadeed		Muslim

Fifth District: Shafa Badran, Abu Nsair, Al-Jubaiha, Swaileh, Tlaa' Al-Ali, Um Al-Summaq, and Khalda.

Representative	Affiliation/ Party	Seat Status
Mohammad Abu Hdaib		Muslim
Ahmad Yousif Al-Odwan		Muslim
Sameeh Bino		Muslim/ Circassian

Sixth District: Badr Al-Jadeeda, West Umm Uthaina, Al-Diar, Al-Swaifyah, and Wadi Al-Seer.

Representative	Affiliation/ Party	Seat Status
Nassar Al-Qaisi		Muslim
Lutfi Al-Deerani		Muslim
Muneer Sobr		Muslim/ Circassian

Seventh District: Na'our.

Representative	Affiliation/ Party	Seat Status
Adnan Khalaf Al-Ajarmih		Muslim

=== Aqaba Governorate (1 Districts, 2 Seats excluding South Bedouins Seats) ===
Governorate of Aqaba District

Representative	Affiliation/ Party	Seat Status
Ziad Al-Shwaikh		Muslim
Mohammad Al-Badri		Muslim

=== Balqa Governorate (4 Districts, 10 Seats) ===
First District: Al-Qasaba, Mahis, and Fuhais.

Representative	Affiliation/ Party	Seat Status
Mahmoud Kharabsheh		Muslim
Yasin Al-Zoubi		Muslim
Bassam Al-Manaseer		Muslim
Mubarak Abu Yamin		Muslim
Sulaiman Ghnaimat		Muslim
Hazim Al-Nasir		Christian
Fakhri Iskandar Al-Dawood		Christian

Second District: Southern Shooneh.

Representative	Affiliation/ Party	Seat Status
Mahmoud Suod Al-Odwan		Muslim

Third District: Deir Alla.

Representative	Affiliation/ Party	Seat Status
Khalid al-Sattari		Muslim

Fourth District: 'Ain al-Basha.

Representative	Affiliation/ Party	Seat Status
Mohammad Khalil Aqel	IAF	Muslim

=== Irbid Governorate (9 Districts, 16 Seats) ===
First District: al-Qasabah.

Representative	Affiliation/ Party	Seat Status
Rasmi al-Mallah		Muslim
Qasim Bani Hani		Muslim
Abdullah Gharaybeh		Muslim
Mohammed al-Zanati		Muslim

Second District: Bani Obayd .

Representative	Affiliation/ Party	Seat Status
Abdul Raouf al-Rawabdeh		Muslim
Husni Fandi al-Shayyab		Muslim
Raji Haddad		Christian

Third District: Northern Mazar.

Representative	Affiliation/ Party	Seat Status
ِAser Al-Shurman		Muslim

Fourth District: Ar Ramtha.

Representative	Affiliation/ Party	Seat Status
Ahmad al-Bashabshah		Muslim
Hashim al-Shboul		Muslim

Fifth District: Bni Kanana

Representative	Affiliation/ Party	Seat Status
Salah al-Zubi		Muslim
Yahia Khalid Obaidat		Muslim

Sixth District: Kora.

Representative	Affiliation/ Party	Seat Status
Yasin Abdul Na'eem Bani Yasin		Muslim

Seventh District: Northern Aghwar.

Representative	Affiliation/ Party	Seat Status
Khalid al-Meesh		Muslim

Eighth District: Tayybeh

Representative	Affiliation/ Party	Seat Status
Sharaf al-Hayajnah		Muslim

Ninth District: Wastiyyeh

Representative	Affiliation/ Party	Seat Status
Mahmoud Al-Mhaidat		Muslim

=== Jerash Governorate (1 District, 4 Seats) ===
Governorate of Jerash District

Representative	Affiliation/ Party	Seat Status
Mohammad Khalid Zraiqat		Muslim
Mefleh al-Rhaimi		Muslim
Ahmad Mustafa al-'Utoum		Muslim
Sulaiman Salamah al-Sa'ad	IAF	Muslim

=== Kerak Governorate (6 Districts, 10 Seats) ===
First District Al Qasabah.

Representative	Affiliation/ Party	Seat Status
Abdul Hameed Thunaybat	IAF	Muslim
Abdul Fattah al-Ma'aytah		Muslim
Abdullah Ghanem Zureqat		Christian

Second District: al-Qaser

Representative	Affiliation/ Party	Seat Status
Abdul Hadi al-Majali		Muslim
Michael Hijazeen		Christian

Third District: Southern Mazar.

Representative	Affiliation/ Party	Seat Status
Aatif al-Tarawneh		Muslim
Yousef al-Sarayreh		Muslim

Fourth District: Southern Aghwar.

Representative	Affiliation/ Party	Seat Status
Jameel Salamah Al-E'shoosh		Muslim

Fifth District: 'Ayy.

Representative	Affiliation/ Party	Seat Status
Ali Al-Dla'een		Muslim

Sixth District Faqqu.

Representative	Affiliation/ Party	Seat Status
Nasr Al-Hamaydeh		Muslim

=== Ma'an Governorate (3 Districts, 4 Seats excluding South Bedouins Seats) ===
First District: al-Qasabah.

Representative	Affiliation/ Party	Seat Status
Tawfiq Mahmoud Kraishan		Muslim
Adel Ebraheem Meshri		Muslim

Second District: al-Shawbak.

Representative	Affiliation/ Party	Seat Status
Wasfi Ali Al-Rawashdeh		Muslim

Third District: Petra

Representative	Affiliation/ Party	Seat Status
Hani Al-Nawafleh		Muslim

=== Madaba Governorate (2 Districts, 4 Seats) ===
First District: al-Qasabeh

Representative	Affiliation/ Party	Seat Status
Yousef Abu-Slaih		Muslim
Mohammed Abu Alhaih		Muslim
Riadh Al-Yacoub		Christian

Second District: Dhiban.

Representative	Affiliation/ Party	Seat Status
Falak al-Jam'ani	only female PM to be directly elected outside women-quota	Muslim

=== Mafraq Governorate (1 District, 4 Seats excluding North Bedouins Seats) ===
First District

Representative	Affiliation/ Party	Seat Status
Abdul Kareem Al-Dughmi		Muslim
Tyseer Shdaifat		Muslim
Ibrahim Al-Husban		Muslim
Meflih Al-Khaza'lah		Muslim

=== Tafilah Governorate (2 Districts, 4 Seats) ===
First District: al-Qasabah.

Representative	Affiliation/ Party	Seat Status
Ibrahim Sulaiman Al-E'taiwai		Muslim
Abdul Rahman Al-Hanaqtah		Muslim
Mohammed Abdul Raheem Awaad		Muslim

Second District: Bisairah.

Representative	Affiliation/ Party	Seat Status
Mohammed al-Saudi		Muslim

=== Zarqa Governorate (4 Districts, 10 Seats) ===
First District

Representative	Affiliation/ Party	Seat Status
Daifalla Al-'Omoosh		Muslim
Fawaz Hamdallah		Muslim
Mirza Qasim Bolad		Muslim/ Circassian
Bassam Haddadeen		Christian

Second District

Representative	Affiliation/ Party	Seat Status
Musa Barakat Al-Zawahreh		Muslim
Musa Rasheed Al-Khalayleh		Muslim
Farhan Noman Al-Ghwairi		Muslim

Third District

Representative	Affiliation/ Party	Seat Status
Nawaf Al-Zyood		Muslim

Fourth District

Representative	Affiliation/ Party	Seat Status
Marzouq Al-Da'ajah		Muslim
Mohammed Al-Hajj		Muslim

=== North Bedouin Tribes Closed District (3 Seats) ===
Representative	Affiliation/ Party	Seat Status
Habis Rakan Al-Shabeeb		Muslim
Sa'ad Hayel Al-Sroor		Muslim
Sowan Talab Al-Shurufat		Muslim

=== Center Bedouin Tribes Closed District (3 Seats) ===
Representative	Affiliation/ Party	Seat Status
Salih Radi Al-Jbour		Muslim
Mejhim Al-Khraisha		Muslim
Mohammed Kannoush Al-Shraa'a		Muslim

=== South Bedouin Tribes Closed District (3 Seats) ===
Representative	Affiliation/ Party	Seat Status
Awwad Al-Zawaydah		Muslim
Sanad Al-Naimat		Muslim
Abdallah Al-Jazi		Muslim

=== Woman Minimum Quota (National District, 6 Seats) ===
Representative	Affiliation/ Party	Seat Status	Governorate/ District
Ensaf Al-Khawaldeh		Woman	Tafila, 2nd District
Hamdiah Al-Qweider		Woman	Kerak, 6th District
Reem Abdul Razzaq		Woman	Zarqa, 3rd District
Tharwat Al-Amro		Woman	Kerak, 2nd District
Nariman Al-Rousan		Woman	Irbid, 5th District
Amnih Al-Gharagheer		Woman	Balqa, 3rd District

== See also ==
- Jordanian parliamentary election results, 2013
- 2007 Jordanian parliamentary election
- 2003 Jordanian parliamentary election
