= Mohammad Mahseiri =

Jordanian politician

Mohammad Mahseiri (died 31 January 2013) was a Jordanian politician. He was chosen as a member of the House of Representatives in the 23 January 2013 elections. He was chosen for the Second District of Amman Governorate and he died of a heart attack only a week after his election. On 21 April 2013 a by-election was held to fill Mahseiri's seat, with the seat being won by his brother Abed Mahseiri.
