= Mahmoud Hweimel =

Jordanian politician

Mahmoud Hweimel (died 20 August 2013) was a Jordanian politician. He served as Member of the House of Representatives three times, and from 1996 to 1997 served as Minister of State in the government of Abdul Karim al-Kabariti.

== Career ==
Hweimel was born in the Gour Al-Mazra'a region of Karak Governorate, Jordan. He was elected to the House of Representatives for the first time in 1989, and once more in 1993. In 1996 and 1997 he served as Minister of State in the government of Abdul Karim al-Kabariti. In January 2013 he was once more elected to the House of Representatives, serving as Representative for the Fourth District of Karak Governorate.

After suffering from cancer for a long time he died on 20 August 2013.

A by-election to determine Hweimel's successor was scheduled for 9 November 2013. It was won by Mifleh Esheibat.
