= Reem Abu Dalbouh =

Jordanian politician

Reem Abu Dalbouh (Arabic: ريم أبو دلبوح) is a member of the Jordanian House of Representatives for Mafraq's first electoral district, having been elected as part of the national quota for seats held by women.

== Early life and education ==
Abu Dalbouh (full name Reem Oqleh Nawwash Abu Dalbouh) was born in 1970. She completed her studies in Jordan, earning a bachelor's degree in law, a master's degree in civil law, and a doctorate in civil law. She taught law at a number of Jordanian universities prior to her career in parliament. She has also served on the legal team for the Jordanian National Commission for Women.

== Parliamentary career ==
Abu Dalbouh was elected to parliament in 2013, 2016, and 2020 as a part of the quota system. She is head of the Jordanian Parliament's Women and Family Affairs Committee and is a member of the women's caucus. In these capacities, she has participated in internationally sponsored events and campaigns on women's participation in economic and public life in Jordan. She has also publicly spoken out against cyber-bullying and its disproportionate impact on women.

She has publicly collaborated with UN Women, the United Nations Development Programme (UNDP), and the International Foundation for Women's Empowerment during her parliamentary career.
