= Hejaz railway =

Narrow-gauge railway line from Damascus to Medina

Hejaz railway سكة حديد الحجاز (Arabic) حجاز دمیریولی (Ottoman Turkish)
- Hedjaz railway
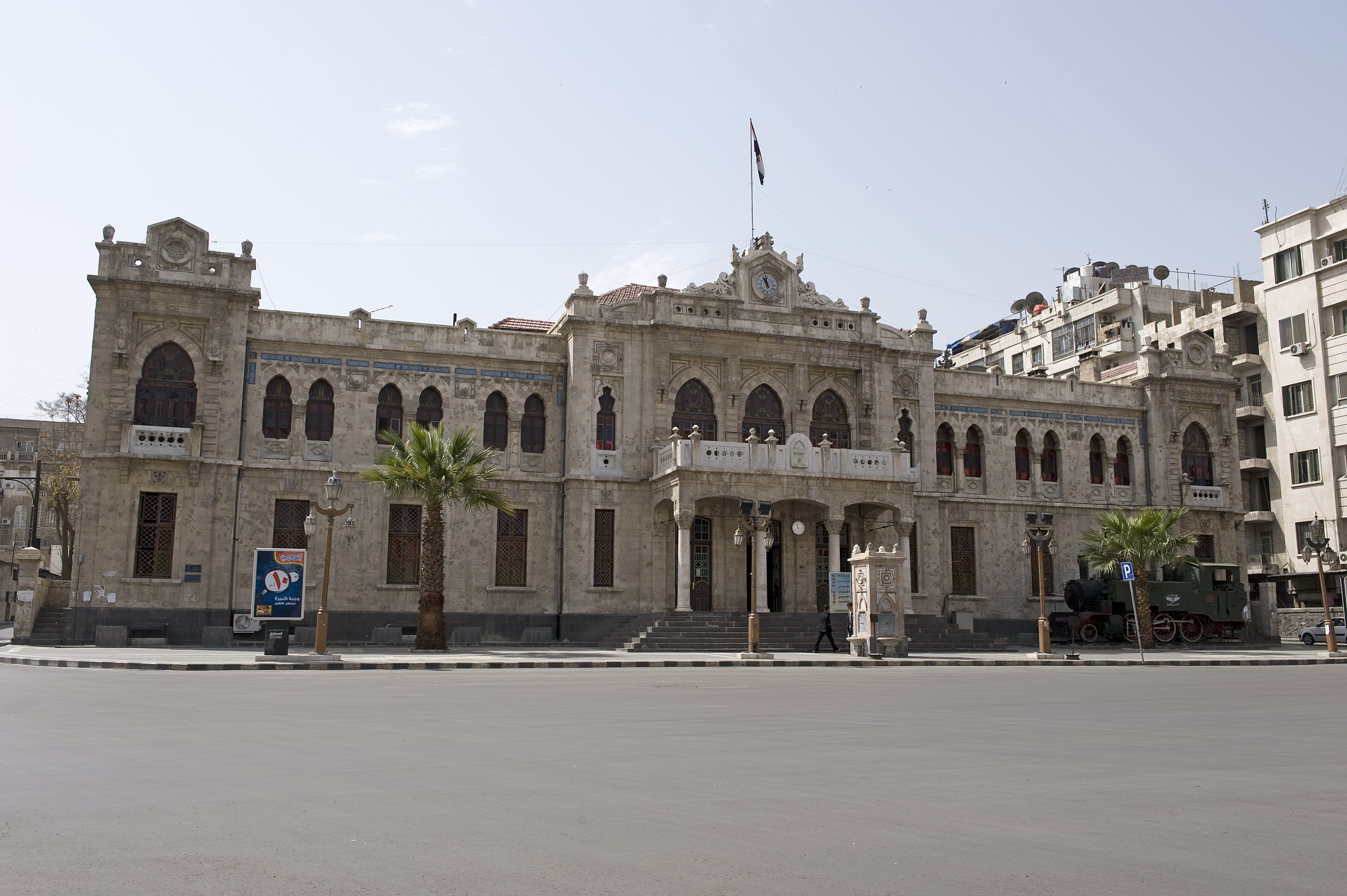
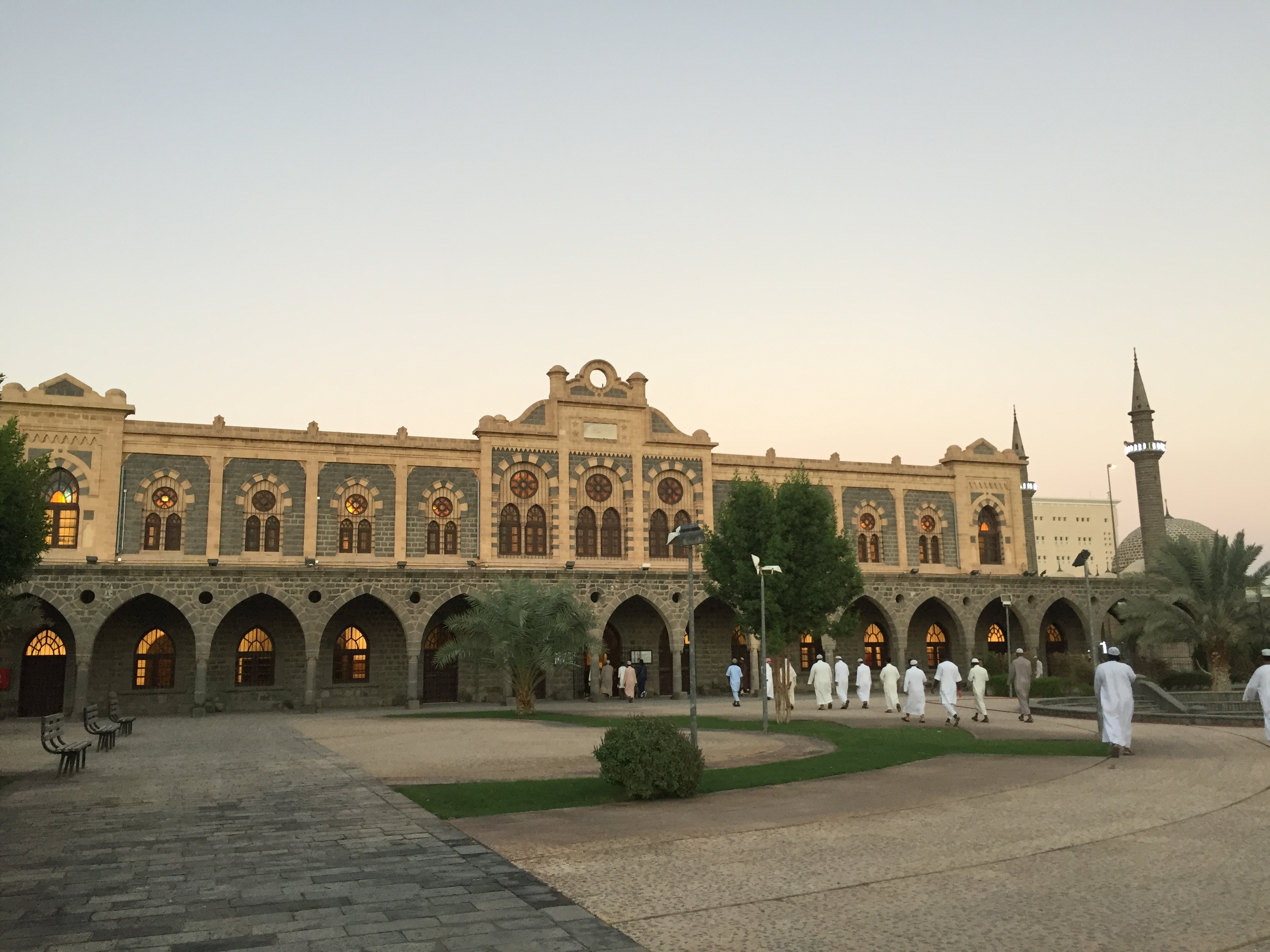
- Hejaz Railway Station in Damascus Hejaz Railway Station in Medina

Overview
- Locale: Palestine, Southern Syria, Jordan, northern Saudi Arabia
- Dates of operation: 1908–1920
- Successor: Aqaba Railway in Jordan; Hedjaz Jordan Railway in Jordan; Haramain High Speed Railway in Saudi Arabia; Jezreel Valley Railway in Palestine; Palestine Railway in Palestine

Technical
- Track gauge: 1,050 mm (3 ft 5 11/32 in)
The railway in 1908

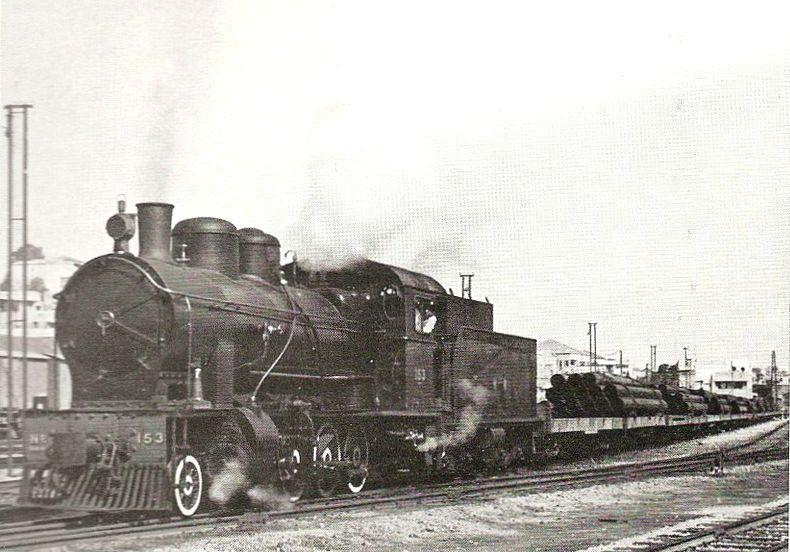
Swiss Locomotive and Machine Works (SLM) in Switzerland built a class of ten 2-8-0 locomotives for the Hejaz railway in 1912, numbered 87–96. They were later renumbered 150–159. Several were captured in 1918 by British imperial forces or transferred in 1927 to Palestine Railways, which had taken over the Hejaz railway's Jezreel Valley branch in 1920. 153 (formerly 90) was transferred in 1927 and is pictured on the Jezreel Valley railway in 1946.

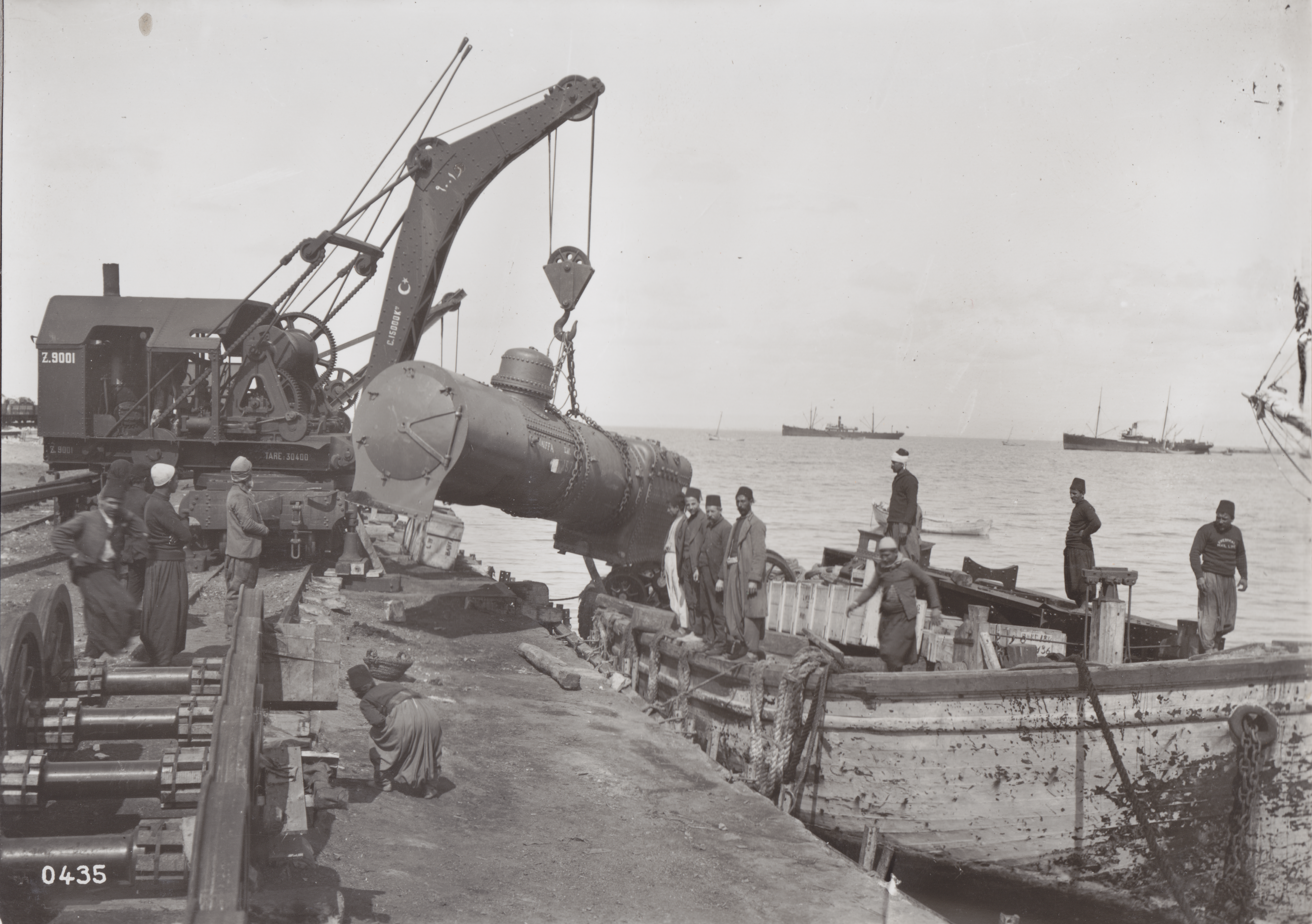
The boiler for an SLM locomotive being unloaded at the port of Haifa, c. 1913

The Hejaz railway (also spelled Hedjaz or Hijaz; Arabic: سِكَّة حَدِيد الحِجَاز sikkat ḥadīd al-ḥijāz or Arabic: الخَط الحَدِيدِي الحِجَازِي, Ottoman Turkish: حجاز دمیریولی, Turkish: Hicaz Demiryolu) was a narrow-gauge railway (1,050 mm / 3 ft 5 11/32 in track gauge) that ran from Damascus to Medina, through the Hejaz region of modern-day Saudi Arabia, with a branch line to Haifa on the Mediterranean Sea. The project was ordered by Sultan Abdul Hamid II in March 1900.

It was a part of the Ottoman railway network and the original goal was to extend the line from the Haydarpaşa Terminal in Kadıköy, Istanbul beyond Damascus to the Islamic holy city of Mecca. However, construction was interrupted due to the outbreak of World War I, and it reached only to Medina, 400 kilometres (250 mi) short of Mecca. The completed Damascus to Medina section was 1,300 kilometres (810 mi). It was the only railway completely built and operated by the Ottoman Empire.

The main purpose of the railway was to establish a connection between Istanbul, the capital of the Ottoman Empire and the seat of the Islamic Caliphate, and Hejaz in Arabia, the site of the holiest shrines of Islam and Mecca, the destination of the Hajj annual pilgrimage. Other objectives were to improve the economic and political integration of the distant Arabian provinces into the Ottoman state, and to facilitate the transportation of military forces.

In the Jordanian and Saudi deserts, treasure hunters searching for golden hoards allegedly hidden by the retreating Turks during the Arab Revolt under or around the railway tracks have led to massive and ongoing destruction of abandoned tracks and stations, as well as of still maintained sections. Rails are pilfered for scrap. The Syrian Civil War has led to further damage to railway structures in Syria.

== History ==
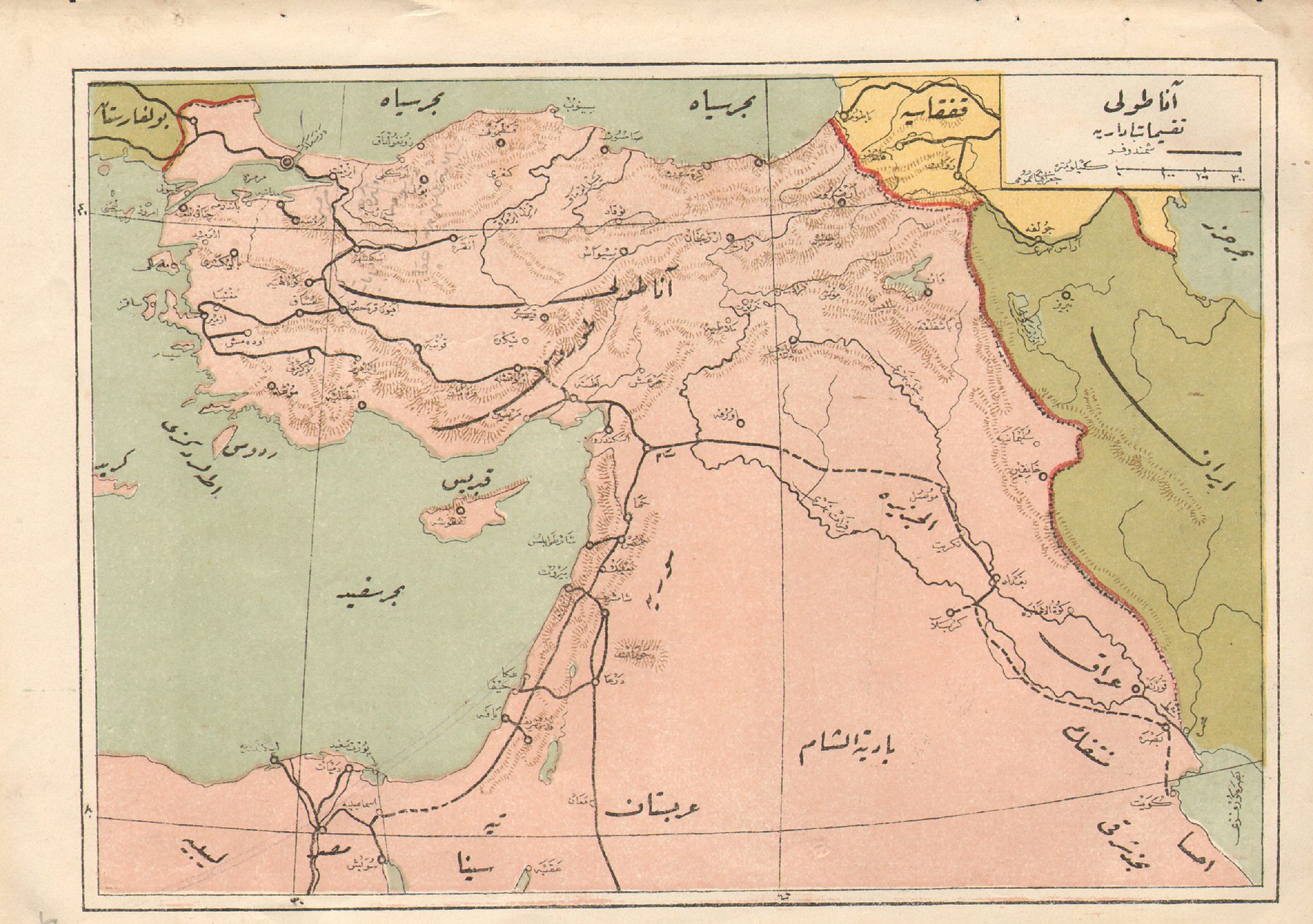
Map showing the Ottoman railways on the eve of World War I

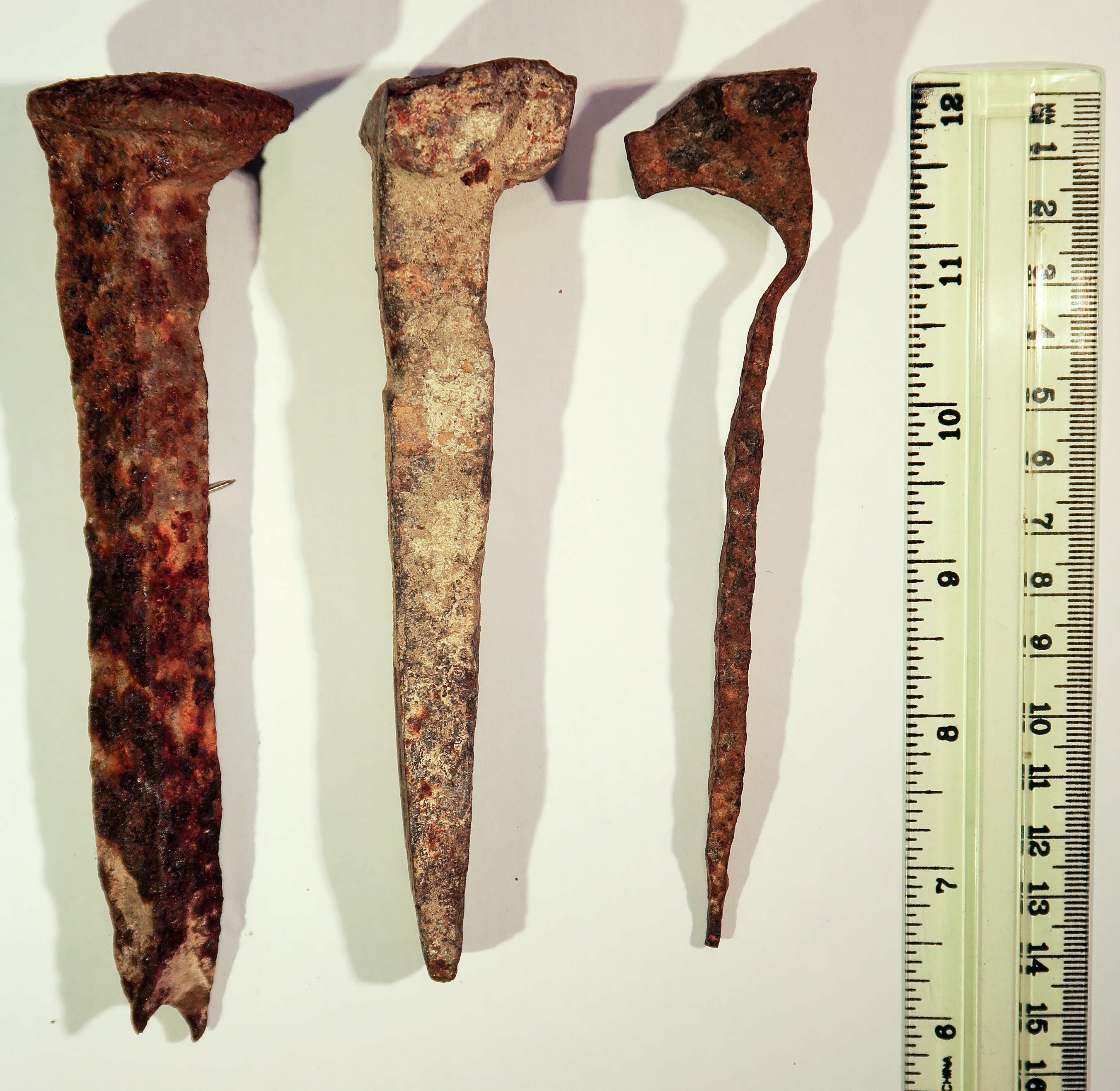
Railroad spikes of the old Jezreel Valley railway (part of the Hejaz railway), found near Kfar Baruch

Prior to the construction of the line, it took 40 days from Damascus to Medina. The railway shortened the time to 5 days. The railway is the only railway which was operated and built by the Ottoman Empire. At first, German engineers were employed as technical support, however over time they were replaced by Ottoman technicians. According to Özyüksel, the Ottomans built the project in order to weaken the Arab nationalist movements and strengthen the empire's Islamist positioning.

The loss of Christian territories in Europe turned the Ottoman Empire into a more Islamic centred entity according to Özyüksel . The empire under Sultan Abdulhamid was concerned with non-Turks in the empire turning to nationalism and thus disintegrating the empire. The Ottomans sought to use Islam to unite their various subjects and prevent the spread of nationalist ideas. The railway was meant to enhance the image of the Sultan as a paramount figure in the Islamic world. The construction of the Hejaz railway would assist the Ottoman empire in preventing Bedouin attacks on pilgrims to Mecca and Medina. According to Özyüksel it was meant to weaken the independence of amirs in Mecca and Medina and strengthen the Ottoman state in the region.

=== Construction ===
==== Project; survey ====
Railways were experiencing a building boom in the late 1860s, and the Hejaz region was one of the many areas up for speculation. The first such proposal involved a railway stretching from Damascus to the Red Sea. This plan was soon dashed however, as the Amir of Mecca raised objections regarding the sustainability of his own camel transportation project should the line be constructed.

Ottoman involvement in the creation of a railway began with Colonel Ahmed Reshid Pasha, who, after surveying the region on an expedition to Yemen in 1871–1873, concluded that the only feasible means of transport for Ottoman soldiers traveling there was by rail. Other Ottoman officers, such as Osman Nuri Pasha, also offered up proposals for a railway in the Hejaz, arguing its necessity if security in the Arabian region were to be maintained.

==== Funding and symbolism ====
Many around the world did not believe that the Ottoman Empire would be able to fund such a project: it was estimated the railway would cost around 4 million Turkish lira, a sizeable portion of the budget. The Ziraat Bankasi, a state bank which served agricultural interests in the Ottoman Empire, provided an initial loan of 100,000 lira in 1900. This initial loan allowed the project to commence later the same year. Abdul Hamid II called on all Muslims in the world to make donations to the construction of the Hejaz Railway. The project had taken on a new significance. Not only was the railway to be considered an important military feature for the region, it was also a religious symbol. Hajis, pilgrims on their way to the holy city of Mecca, often didn't reach their destination when travelling along the Hejaz route. Unable to contend with the tough, mountainous conditions, up to 20% of hajis died on the way.

Abdul Hamid was adamant that the railway stand as a symbol for Muslim power and solidarity: this rail line would make the religious pilgrimage easier not only for Ottomans, but all Muslims. As a result, no foreign investment in the project was to be accepted. The Donation Commission was established to organize the funds effectively, and medallions were given out to donors. Despite propaganda efforts such as railway greeting cards, only about 1 in 10 donations came from Muslims outside of the Ottoman Empire. One of these donors, however, was Muhammad Inshaullah, a wealthy Punjabi newspaper editor. He helped to establish the Hejaz Railway Central Committee. The BBC said the project was funded completely by donations.

The attempt to reach the Hejaz via rail despite major economic incentives outside the Hajj season is probably due to religious and political reasons according to Özyüksel.

==== Resources; construction work ====
Access to resources was a significant stumbling block during construction of the Hejaz Railway. Water, fuel, and labor were particularly difficult to find in the more remote reaches of the Hejaz. In the uninhabited areas, camel transportation was employed not only for water, but also food and building materials. Fuel, mostly in the form of coal, was brought in from surrounding countries and stored in Haifa and Damascus.

Labor was certainly the largest obstacle in the construction of the railway. In the more populated areas, much of the labor was fulfilled by local settlers as well as Muslims in the area, who were legally obliged to lend their hands to the construction. This labor was largely employed in the treacherous excavation efforts involved in railway construction. In the more remote areas the railway would be reaching, a more novel solution was put to use. Much of this work was completed by railway troops of soldiers, who in exchange for their railway work, were exempt from one third of their military service.

As the rail line traversed treacherous terrain, many bridges and overpasses had to be built. Since access to concrete was limited, many of these overpasses were made of carved stone and stand to this day.

==== Engineers ====
Both Ottoman and foreign engineers worked together on the construction of the Hejaz Railway, and it was the first Ottoman railway on which Muslim engineers who had graduated from Ottoman engineering schools worked in significant numbers. The construction of the Hejaz railway progressed slower than expected, primarily due to the inexperience of Ottoman engineers. The Hendese-i Mülkiye, the empire’s first engineering school, had been founded only 16 years earlier, limiting the availability of skilled local engineers. As a result, the Ottoman administration abandoned its initial policy of hiring only locals and brought in foreign experts. Engineers from the Anatolian and Baghdad railways were transferred, and under the leadership of the experienced German engineer Meissner, construction accelerated.

Despite this, Sultan Abdülhamid II remained committed to employing Muslim engineers. In 1904, 17 Muslim engineers were hired, and to further develop local expertise, the Ottomans sent engineers to Germany for training. Over time, Muslim Ottoman engineers became involved at all levels of the project. In particular, the section south of al-Ula was staffed exclusively by Muslims, as Christians were barred from entering. The final stretch from al-Ula to Medina was completed successfully under the leadership of Haji Muhtar Beg, relying entirely on Muslim engineers and workers.

==== Transportation volume ====
The Haifa - Dera - Damascus branch of the Hejaz railway was about a fifth of the total rail built for the Hejaz railway and accounted for three quarters of traffic.

==== Economic influence ====
The Hejaz district did not enjoy significant positive economic effects from the Hejaz railway according to Özyüksel. Haifa, a port at the end of a branch line of the Hejaz railway is said to have enjoyed significant growth partily due to the railway connection.

==== Arab opposition ====
The Emir Hussein bin Ali, Sharif of Mecca viewed the railway as a threat to Arab suzerainty, since it provided the Ottomans with easy access to their garrisons in Hejaz, Asir, and Yemen. From its outset, the railway was the target of attacks by local Arab tribes. These were never particularly successful, but neither were the Turks able to control areas more than a mile or so either side of the line. Due to the locals' habit of pulling up wooden sleepers to fuel their camp-fires, some sections of the track were laid on iron sleepers.

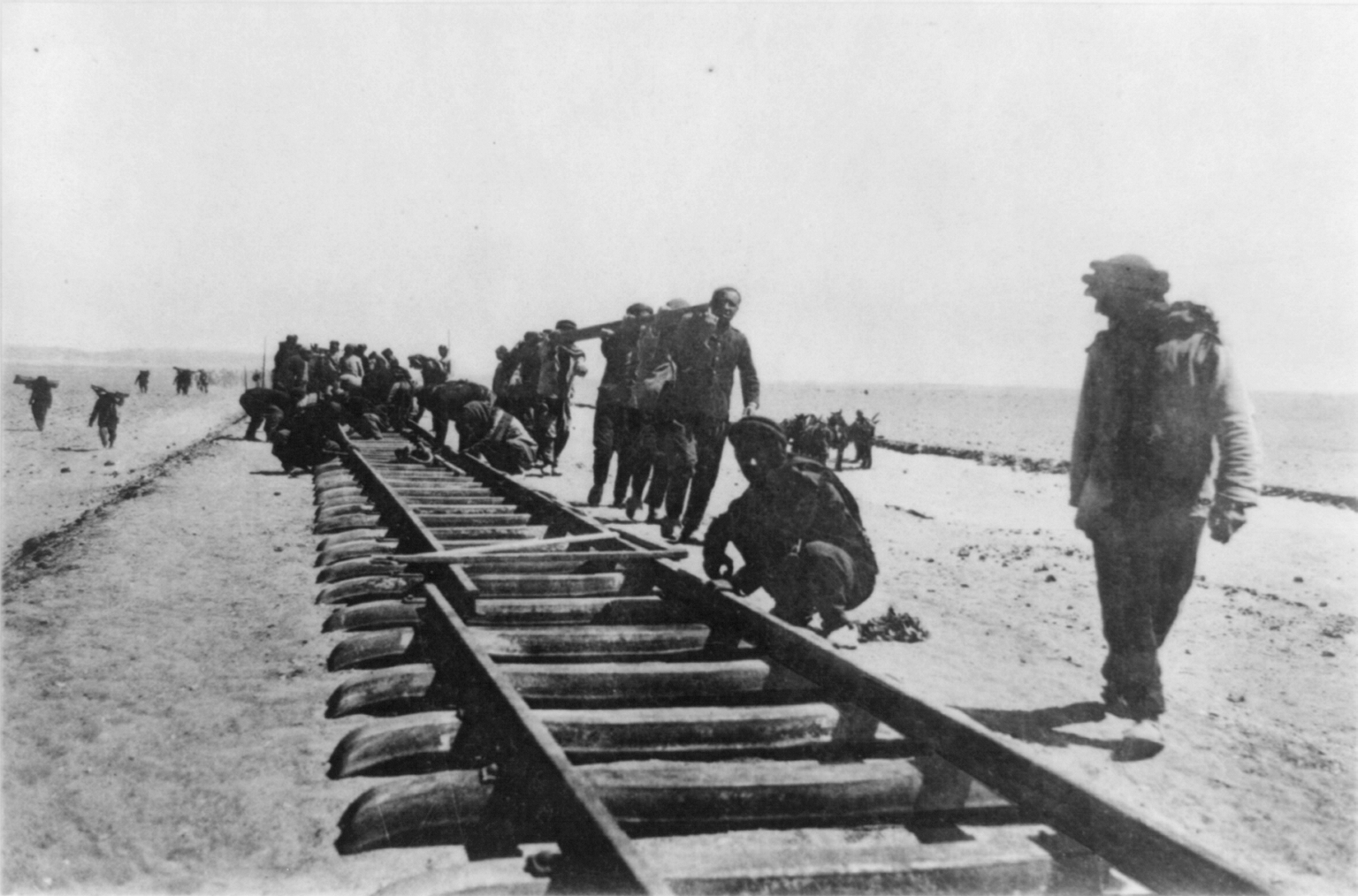
Workers laying track for the Hejaz railway near Tabuk in 1906

In September 1907, as crowds celebrated the rail reaching Al-'Ula station, a rebellion organized by the tribe of Harb threatened to halt progress. The rebels objected to the railway stretching all the way to Mecca; they feared they would lose their livelihood as camel transport was made obsolete. It was later decided by Abdul Hamid that the railway would only go so far as Medina.

==== British opposition ====
Due to a British ultimatum, Özyüksel says the Ottomans were not able to build the Aqaba exit from the Hejaz network. The British backed the publishing of newspaper articles in India against the Hejaz railway in order to prevent Indian muslims from donating to the Hejaz railway. The British also banned the wearing of Hejaz railway medals which were gifted to those who had donated to the construction of the railway. The British claimed that the donations went to the Sultan's own devices and not for the railway itself. British use of the railway included regular trips by Gertrude Bell, who visited Al-Jizah often.

==== French opposition ====
The French opposed the Afula - Jerusalem track, which prevented the Ottomans from completing that segment of the Hejaz Network.

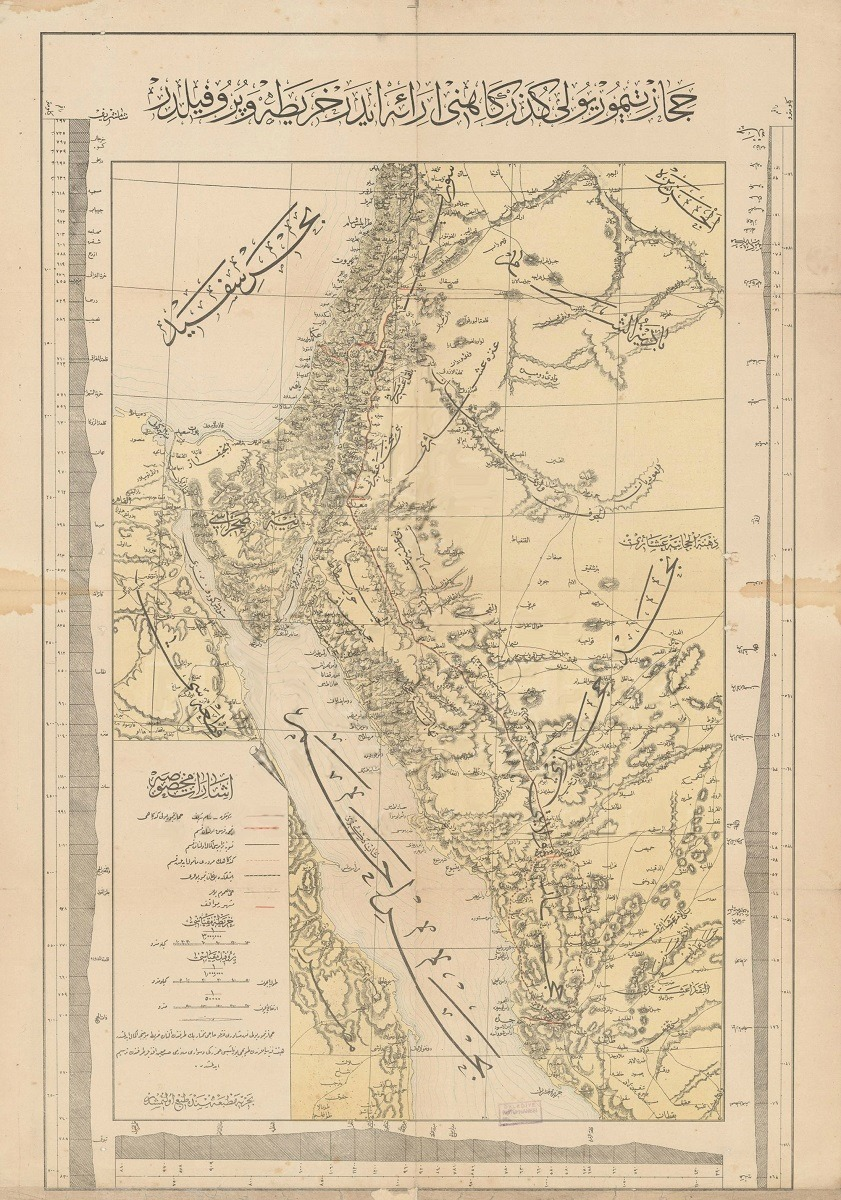
Ottoman map of the railway

==== Completion (1908-13) ====
Under the supervision of chief engineer Mouktar Bey, the railway reached Medina on 1 September 1908, the anniversary of the Sultan's accession. However, many compromises had to be made in order to finish by this date, with some sections of track being laid on temporary embankments across wadis. In 1913 the Hejaz Railway Station was opened in central Damascus as the starting point of the line.

=== Reception ===
The railways were received "enthusiastically" according to Özyüksel. The press in countries with significant Muslim populations outside the Ottoman empire including Egypt and India covered the project and also asked Muslims to assist the Ottoman Caliph in the building of the railway.

=== World War I ===
To fuel locomotives operating on the railway during World War I, the German Army produced shale oil from the Yarmouk oil shale deposit. The Turks constructed a military railway from the Hejaz line to the Beersheba Turkish railway station, opening on 30 October 1915.

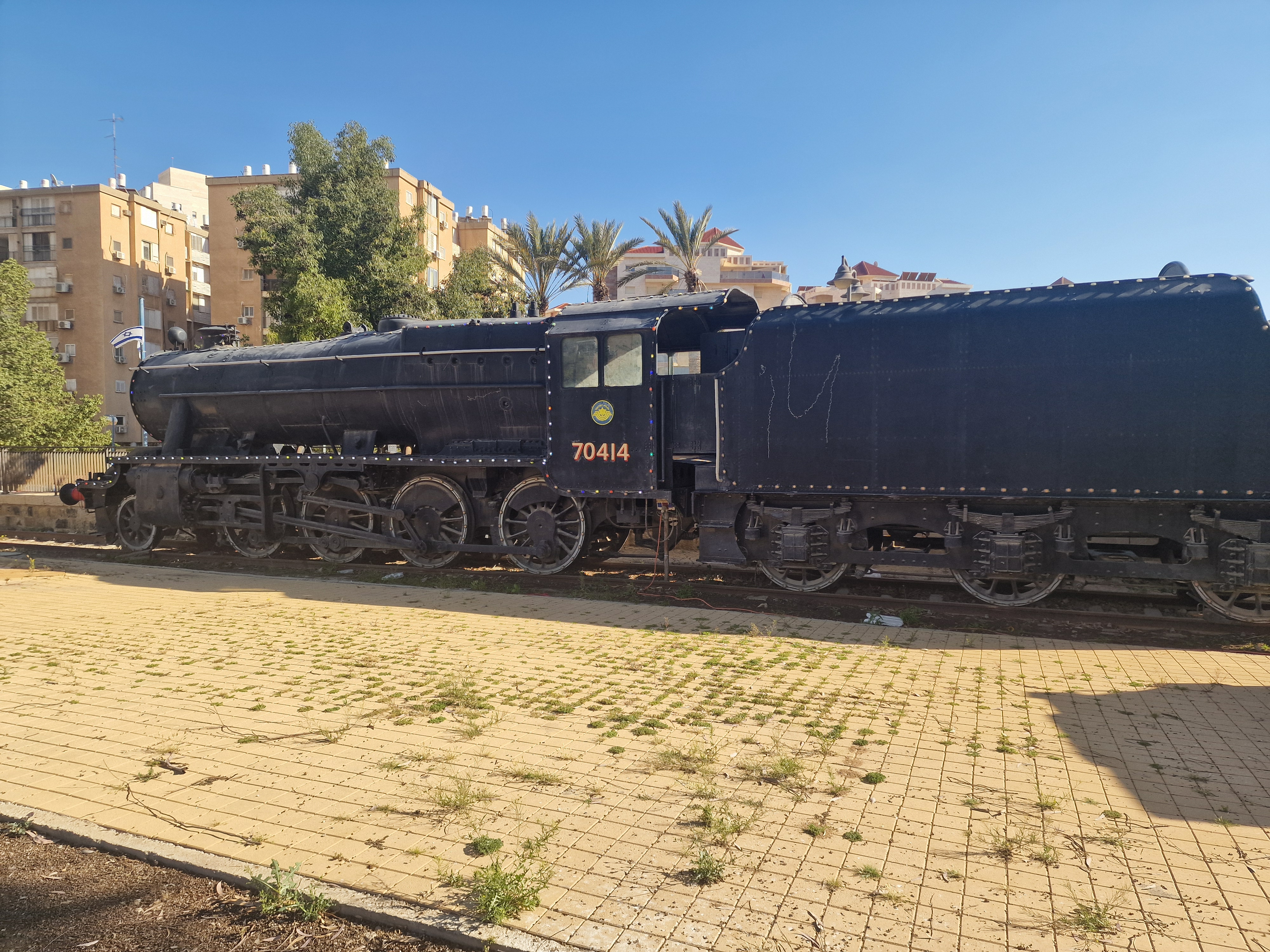
An identical model of the locomotive that was in Beer Sheva in 1915 - 70414.

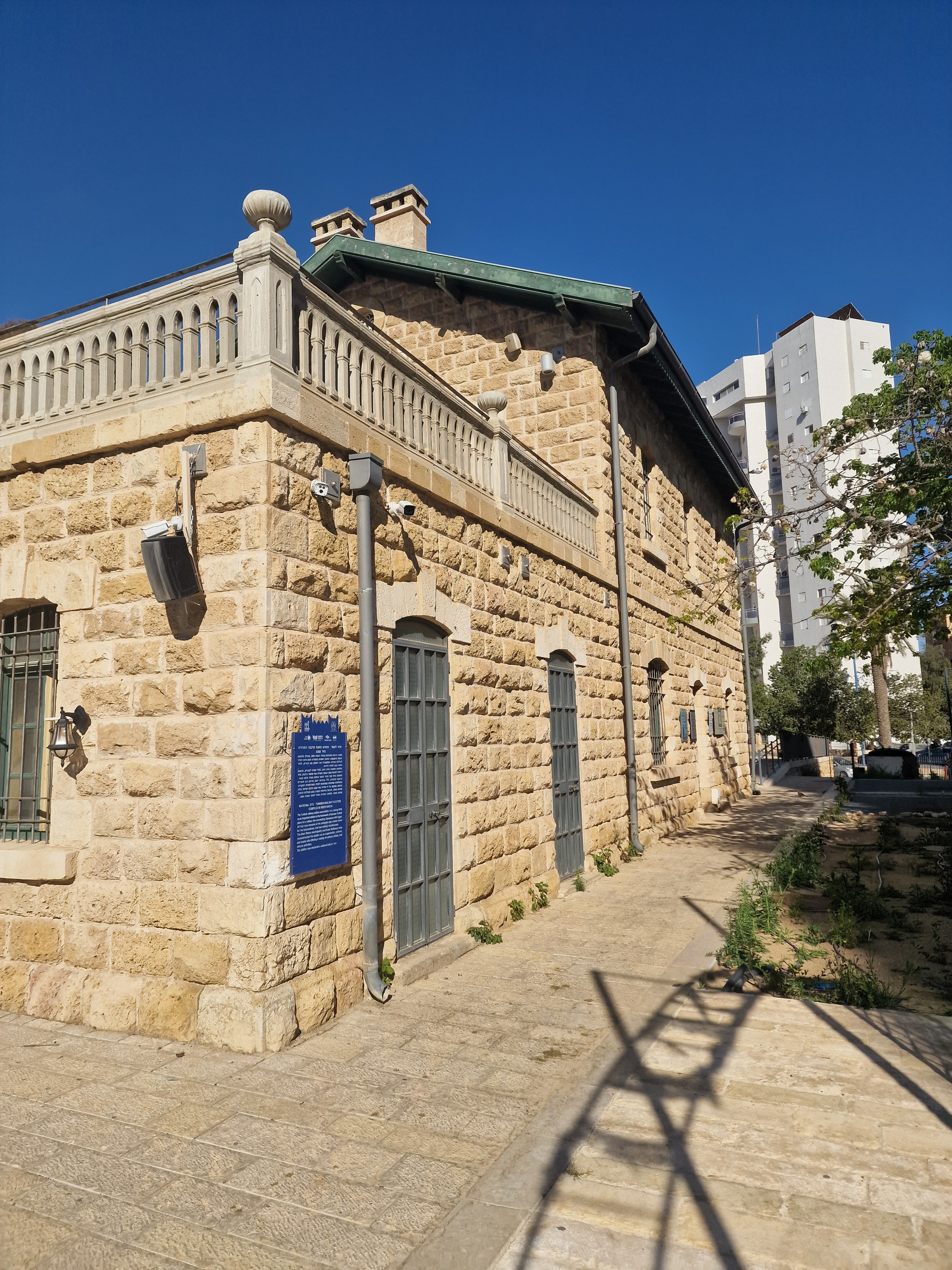
The Ottoman Railway Station in Beer Sheva.

The Hejaz line was repeatedly attacked and damaged, particularly during the Arab Revolt, when Ottoman trains were ambushed by the guerrilla force led by T. E. Lawrence.

- On 26 March 1917, T. E. Lawrence (known as Lawrence of Arabia) led an attack on the Aba el Naam Station, taking 30 prisoners and inflicting 70 casualties on the garrison. He went on to say, "Traffic was held up for three days of repair and investigation. So we did not wholly fail."
- In May 1917, British bombers dropped bombs on Al-'Ula Station. In July 1917, Stewart Newcombe, a British engineer and associate of Lawrence, conspired with forces from the Egyptian and Indian armies to sabotage the railway. The Al-Akhdhar station was attacked and 20 Turkish soldiers were captured.
- In October 1917, the Ottoman stronghold of Tabuk fell to Arab rebels. The Abu-Anna’em station was also captured.
- In November 1917, Sharif Abdullah and the tribe of Harb attacked Al-Bwair station and destroyed two locomotives.
- In December 1917, a group of men led by Ibn Ghusiab derailed a train on the line south of Tabuk.

With the Arab Revolt and the dissolution of the Ottoman Empire, it was unclear to whom the railway should belong. The area was divided between the British and the French, both eager to assume control. However, following years of neglected maintenance, many sections of track fell into disrepair; the railway was effectively abandoned by 1920. In 1924, when Ibn Saud took control of the peninsula, plans to revive the railway were no longer on the agenda.

=== World War II ===
In the Second World War, the Samakh Line (from Haifa to Deraa at the Syrian border and to Damascus) was operated for the Allied forces by the New Zealand Railway Group 17th ROC, from Afula (with workshops at Deraa and Haifa). The locomotives were 1914 Borsig and 1917 Hartmann models from Germany. The line, which had been operated by the Vichy French, was in disrepair. Trains over the steep section between Samakh (now Ma'agan) and Deraa were 230 tons maximum, with 1,000 tons moved in 24 hours. The group also ran 60 miles (95 km) of branch line, including Afula to Tulkarm.

=== 1960s ===
The railway south of the modern Jordanian–Saudi Arabian border remained closed after 1920 and the fall of the Ottoman Empire. An attempt was made to rebuild it in the mid-1960s, but then abandoned due to the Six-Day War in 1967.

== Successor lines ==
Two connected sections of the main line are in service:

- from Amman in Jordan to Damascus in Syria, as the Hedjaz Jordan Railway, and
- from phosphate mines near Ma'an to the Gulf of Aqaba, as the Chemin de Fer de Hedjaz Syrie, or the Aqaba Railway Corporation.

Israel Railways partially rebuilt the long-defunct Haifa extension, the Jezreel Valley railway, using standard gauge, with the possibility of someday extending it to Irbid in Jordan. The rebuilt line opened from Haifa to Beit She'an in October 2016.

Saudi Arabia completed the construction of the Medina-Mecca line (via Jeddah) with the Haramain high-speed railway in 2018.

Azmi Nalshik the head of Jordan Hejaz Railways said that the railways is considered a waqf, meaning it belongs to all Muslims and therefore cannot be sold.

=== Preservation and tourist trains ===
Railway mechanics have restored many of the original steam-powered locomotives: there are nine in working order in Syria and seven in Jordan.

Since the accession of Abdullah II in 1999, relations between Jordan and Syria have improved, causing a revival of interest in the railway. The train runs from Qadam station in the outskirts of Damascus, not from the Hejaz Station, which closed in 2004 due to a major commercial development project. Trains run from Khadam station on demand (usually from German, British or Swiss groups). The northern part of the Zabadani track is no longer accessible.

=== Museums and sightseeing ===
In 2008, the "museum of the rolling stock of Al-Hejaz railway" opened in Damascus' Khadam station after major renovations for an exhibition of the locomotives.

An exhibit on the railway's cultural heritage opened in 2019 at Darat al-Funun in Amman.

The small railway museum at the Mada'in Saleh station in Saudi Arabia has closed, the station building have been converted into the Chedi Hegra Hotel. The engine shed serves at the main restaurant, with a 2-6-0 Jung Railway Locomotive on display. The "Hejaz Railway Museum" in the Medina Railway Station opened in 2006. The museum, which is dedicated to the history and archeology of Medina is 90,000 square meters.

Small non-operating sections of the railway track, buildings and rolling stock are still preserved as tourist attractions in Saudi Arabia. The old railway bridge over the Aqeeq Valley at Medina though was demolished in 2005 due to damage from heavy rain the year before.

Trains destroyed by local Arab, French, and British troops during WWI and the Arab Revolt of 1916–1918 can still be seen where they were attacked.

=== Ongoing destruction ===
As of 2024, in the Jordanian and Saudi deserts, the legend of Ottoman treasure hidden by retreating Turks during the Arab Revolt under or around the railway tracks persists strongly. Locals and adventurers from the wider Middle East have been known to dig around the tracks and stations, hoping to uncover gold hoards. Some even claim to possess maps from Turkey indicating potential treasure sites. Holes are pockmarking the ground, station floors, roofs and walls have been smashed in the search, on top of rails being pilfered for scrap. In Syria, the civil war did not spare the historic railway's inventory either.

=== Revival ===
On 4 February 2009, the Turkish Transport Minister Binali Yıldırım said in Riyadh that Turkey planned to rebuild its section, and called on Saudi Arabia, Jordan and Syria to come together and complete the restoration.

Also in 2009, Jordan's transport ministry proposed a 990-mile (1590-km) US$5 billion rail network, construction of which could begin in the first quarter of 2012. The planned network would provide freight rail links from Jordan to Syria, Saudi Arabia and Iraq. Passenger rail connections could be extended to Lebanon, Turkey and beyond. The government, which will fund part of the project, is inviting tenders from private firms to raise the rest of the project cost.

In November 2018, Middle East Monitor revealed Saudi-Israel's joint plans to revive the railway from Haifa to Riyadh. The Turkish minister of transport, Abdulkadir Uraloğlu, announced in December 2024 that Turkey intends to help restore the railway in partnership with the new Syrian government.

In September 2025, plans to revive the railway from Jordan through Syria to Turkey were revived in an agreement to complete the 30km superstructure.

==== 2026 Saudi-Turkish agreement ====
On 9 June 2026, Saudi Arabia and Turkey signed rail and logistics cooperation agreements to support a Gulf–Europe transport corridor via Syria and Jordan. Officials stated that the project could contribute to the revival of the historic Hejaz Railway route and strengthen regional freight connectivity. Analyses by the Times of Israel and the Foundation for Defense of Democracies described it as a move meant to undermine Israel's regional influence and its participation in the India–Middle East–Europe Economic Corridor in a time of where Arab–Israeli normalization stalled. The 2026 Strait of Hormuz crisis also contributed to the Gulf states support for the project as it highlighted the need for alternatives to the strait.

== Stations ==
Some of the stations were located near the traditional Hajj caravan stations, where the Ottomans had built fortified inns (see Ottoman Hajj route).

The Arabic word for station is "Mahaṭat". The Ottoman- and interwar-period spelling tends to be simpler than the current official ones.

Pre-WWI, the Ottomans used French spelling.

- Damascus Kanawat/Qanawat, 1906 extension
- Damascus Kadem/Qadem (Cadem Works)
  - branch line Damascus-Cadem–Halep
  - branch line to Qayara
- Kiswe (Al-Kiswah)
- Dair Ali (Deir Ali)
- Mismia/ Al-Mismiya, also Masjid/Masjed
- Jabab/Jebab (Ghabaghib)
- Habab (1912)/Khebab (Khabab); in 2000, the station is listed, also at km 69.1, as/at As-Sanamain
- Mehaye/Mohadje (Mahajjah/Muhajjah)
- Shakra (Shaqra(h))
- Ezra (Ezraa/Esra/Izra)
- Gazali (Al-Ghazali, Khirbet Ghazaleh)
  - Haifa-Daraa branch line (Jezreel Valley railway)
- Deraa (Daraa)
- Kum Gharz/Koumgarze; now Kawm Gharz (see "Mahattat Kawm Gharz" at MapCarta, 32°36′10″N 36°09′23″E).
  - Branch line to Bosra
- Nessib (Nasib)

Syria-Jordan border

- Jaber (Jabir as-Sirhan; see Jaber Border Crossing)
- Mafrak (Mafraq). Has a Hajj fort, Khan or Qal'at el-Mafraq.
- Samra/ Semra/Sumra (Khirbet as-Samra, 32°11′N 36°10′E)
- Zerqa/Zarqa. Has a Hajj fort, Manzil az-Zarqa or Qasr Shabib.
- Rusaifa (in 1930, 38)
- Amman
- Kassir (Qasr; see Al-Qasr, Karak)
- Libban/Lubin (Al Lubban)
- Jiza/Zizia (Djizeh/Al-Jizah). Has a Hajj fort, Manzil or Qal'at Zizya
- Deba'a/Daba'a/Dab'ah
- Khan Zebib/Khan az Zabib (Khan az-Zabib: station at 31°28′19″N 36°06′21″E; Umayyad site see here).
- Sultani/Suaka (Suaq/Suaqa)
- Qatrana (Qatraneh) triangle. Has a Hajj fort, Khan Qatrana/Qasr al-Qatraneh.
- Menzil/Manzil
- Harbet-ul-Kreika (1912)/Faraifra (Farafra)
- Al Hasa (al-Hasa/el-Hassa.) The station stands 5 km southeast of the Ottoman Hajj fort of Khan al-Hasa (1760, 30°50′21″N 35°56′01″E), along Wadi el-Hasa's upper course.
- Jerouf (Jurf ad-Darawish)
- Aneiza/ Unaiza (Uneiza/'Unayzah; in Husseiniyeh, Ma'an, Jordan). Has a Hajj fort, Khan al-'Unayzah/ Qal'at 'Unaiza.
- Vadi-Djerdoun (1912)/Jerdun
- Mahan (1912)/Ma'an (Old Station). Has a Hajj fort, Manzilt or Qal'at Ma'an.
- Ghadir al Hajj (Gadir al-Hajj)
- Abu Tarfa/Abu Tarafa or Ghadr el Hadj, only post-WWII
- Shidiyya/Shedia, Bir Shedia
- Fassu'a (station only appears on plan here above, in no other source). Has a Hajj fort, Manzilt or Qal'at Fassu'a, which stands along the railway line.
- Aqaba Shamia, name used by thehejazrailway.com - probably same as Aqaba al-Hejaz
- Hittiyya
- Batn al Ghul (Batn al-Ghul/Batn al-Gul)
- Wadi Rutum/ Wadi Rutm (Wadi Rassim/Wadi Rasem)
- Tel es Sham/Tel Shahem/ Tel Shahm (Tel esh-Sham)
- Ramleh/ Ramle
- Mudévéré/Mudawwara. Has a Hajj fort, Manzilt or Qal'at al-Mudawwara.

Jordan - Saudi Arabia border

- Halat Ammar/Kalaat Amara/Haret Ammar
- Zat-ul-Hadj (1912)/Dhat al-Hajj. Has a Hajj fort.
- Bir Hermas (1911)/Bir Ibn Hermas
- El-Hazim/Al-Hazm
- Muhtatab (Al-Muhtatab)/Makhtab
- Tebouk (1912)/Tabuk
- Wadi Ithil (Wadi al-Athily)
- Khashm Birk/Sahr ul Ghul
- Dar al-Hajj (Dahr al-Hajj/Qareen al-Ghazal)
- Mustabgha (Al-Mustabagha)
- Ashtar alimentation (1911)/Ashdar (1912)/ al-Akhdar (Al-Ukhaydir). Has a Hajj fort, Qal'at al-Akhdar/el-Akhthar.
- Maqsadat ad Dunya
- Khamis/Khamees/Khamisa
- Disa'ad - Al-Assda (al-Khanzira)
- Muazzam/Muazzem/Al-Mu'azzam
- Khashm Sana'a (also Khism, Khashim Sanaa)
- Al-Muteli' (km 883 according to route plan above, or km 878)
- Dar al-Hamra
- Mutalli/Matali (km 904)
- Abu Taqa
- El Muzhim
- Mabrak al-Naga/Mabrakat al-Naka
- Médain Salih (1912)/ Mada'in Saleh/Meda'in Saleh (Al-Hijr/Hegra)
- Wadi Hashish
- El Oula (1912)/ Alula/Al-'Ula
- Bedaï (2911)/ Bedaya
- Mashad
- Sahl Matran/Sahel Mater
- Zumurrud/Zumrud/Zomorod
- Bir Jadeed/Bir el Djedid/Bir Jadid
- Towaira/Tuweiro
- Wayban
- Mudarraj (Madahni)
- Hedié (1912)/ Hedia/Hadiyya (Hadiyyah, Al Madinah)
- Jeda'a/Jada'a
- Ebou Naam (1911)/ Abu Na'am/Abu al-Na'am
- Istabl Antar/Stabl Antar
- Buveiré (1911)/Buéiré (1912)/ Buwair
- Bir Nassif
- Buwat
- Hafiré (1912)/Hafira/al-Hafirah Is on Hajj route.
- Bir Abu Jabir
- Makhit/Muhit
- Biri Osman/Bir Osman
- Medine (1912)/Medina
- Medina Citadel

== Image gallery ==
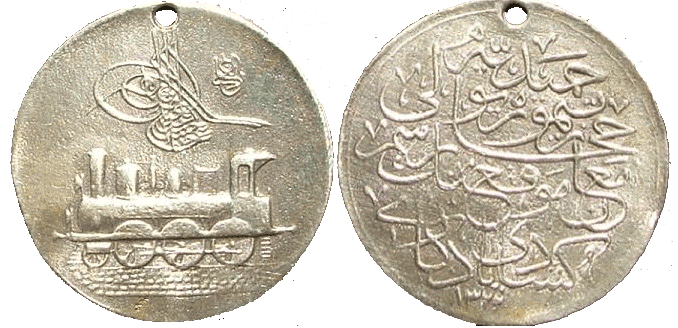
A coin commemorating the opening of the Ma'an Station of the Hejaz railway

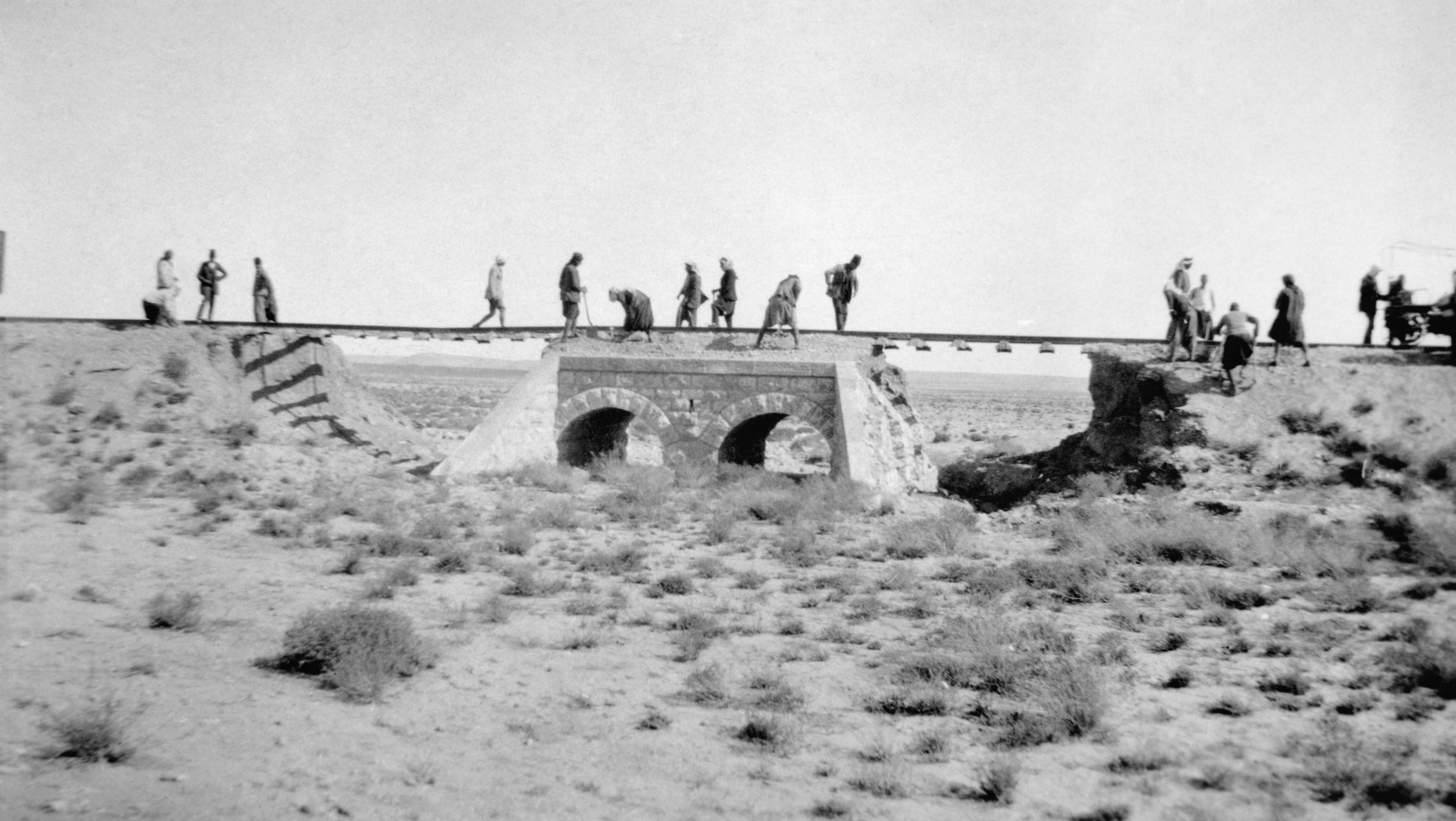
Repairing the railway near Ma'an 1918

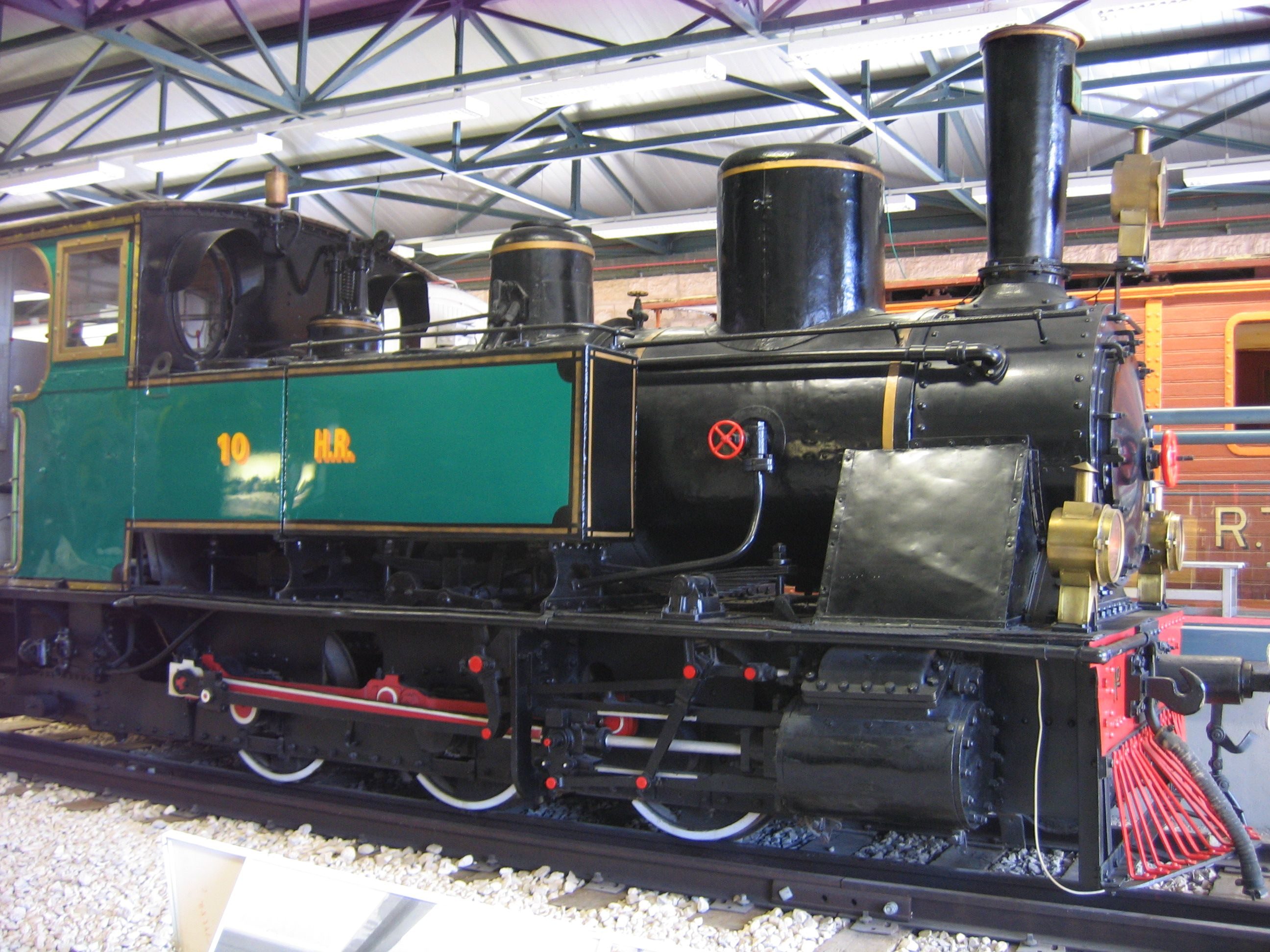
Preserved 1902 Krauss steam locomotive No. 10 at the Israel Railway Museum

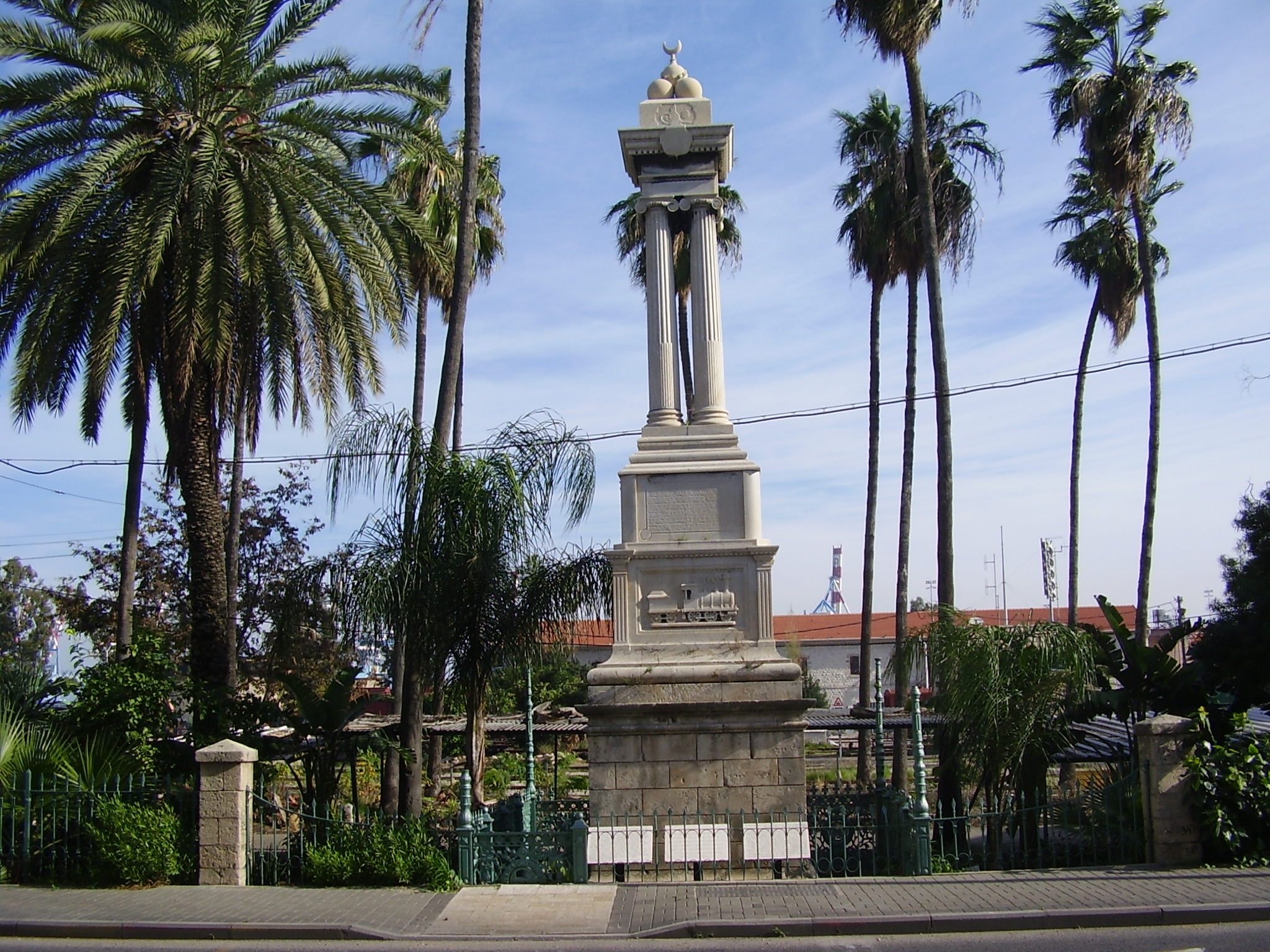
Monument commemorating the opening of the Turkish railway station in Haifa, Israel

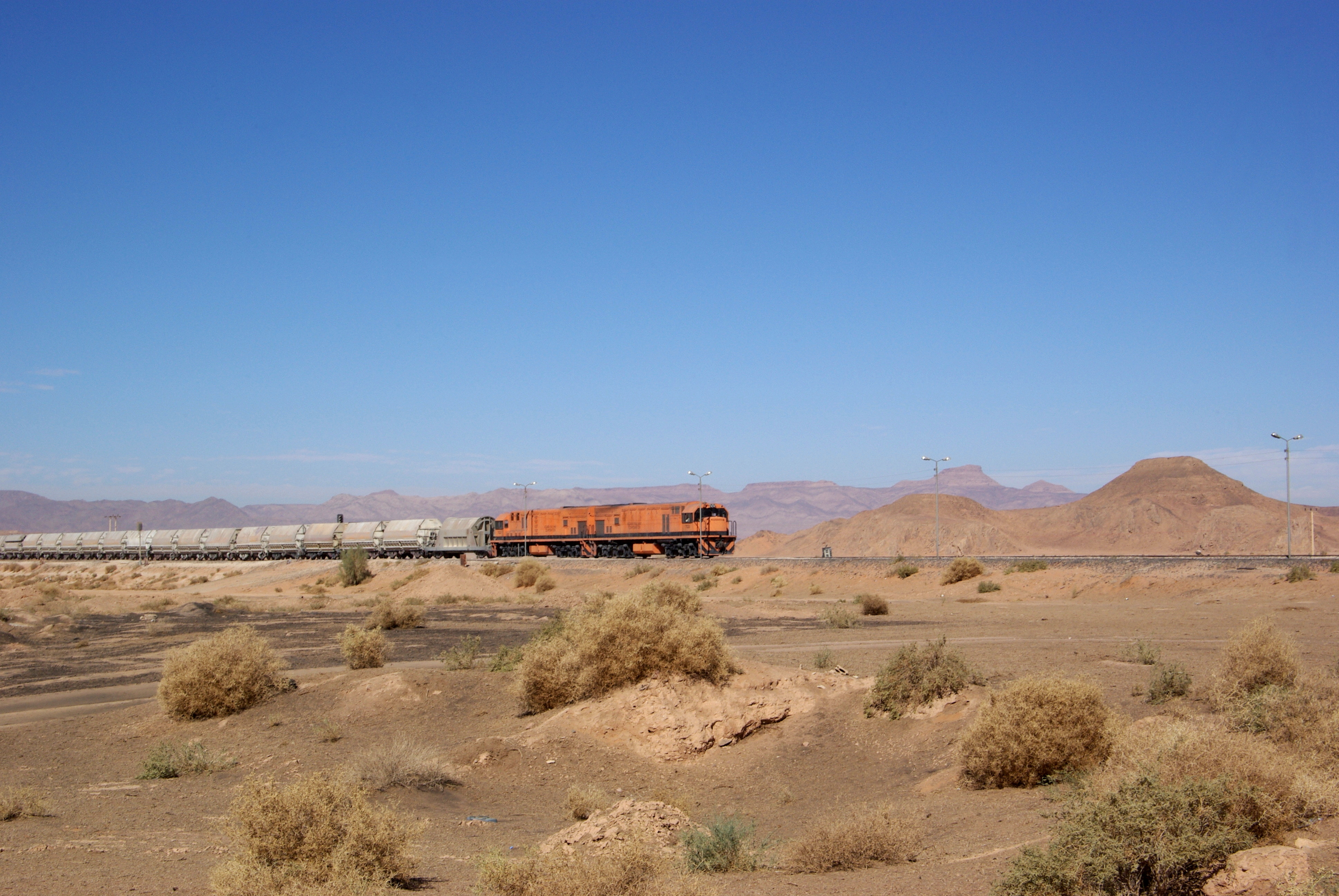
Empty phosphate train at Ram station, coming from Aqaba, Jordan

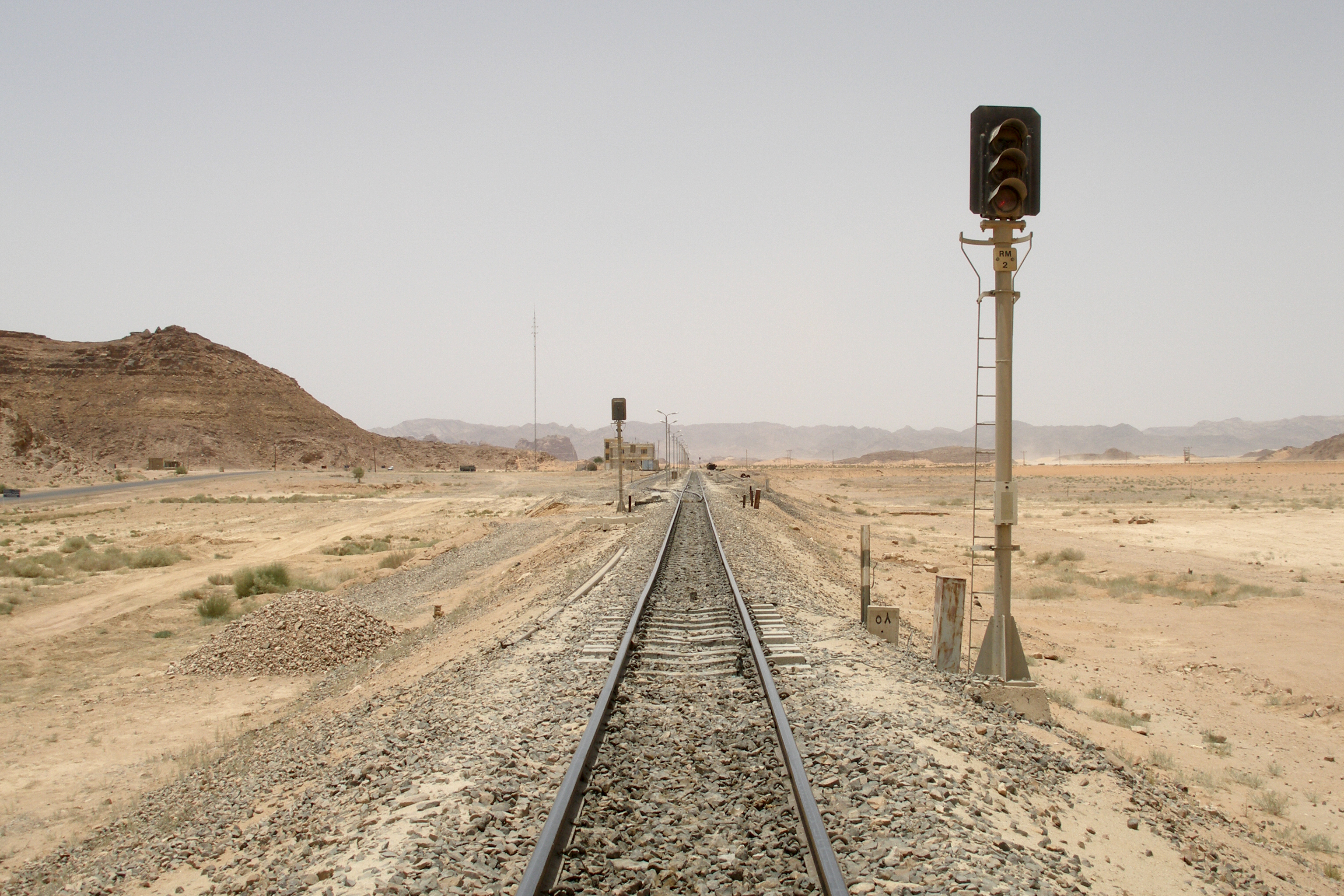
Old railway track to the north of Wadi Rum

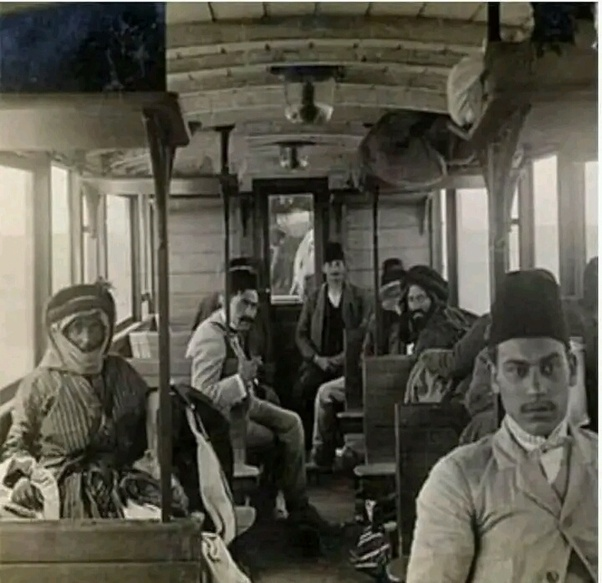
Inside a wagon of the Hejaz train

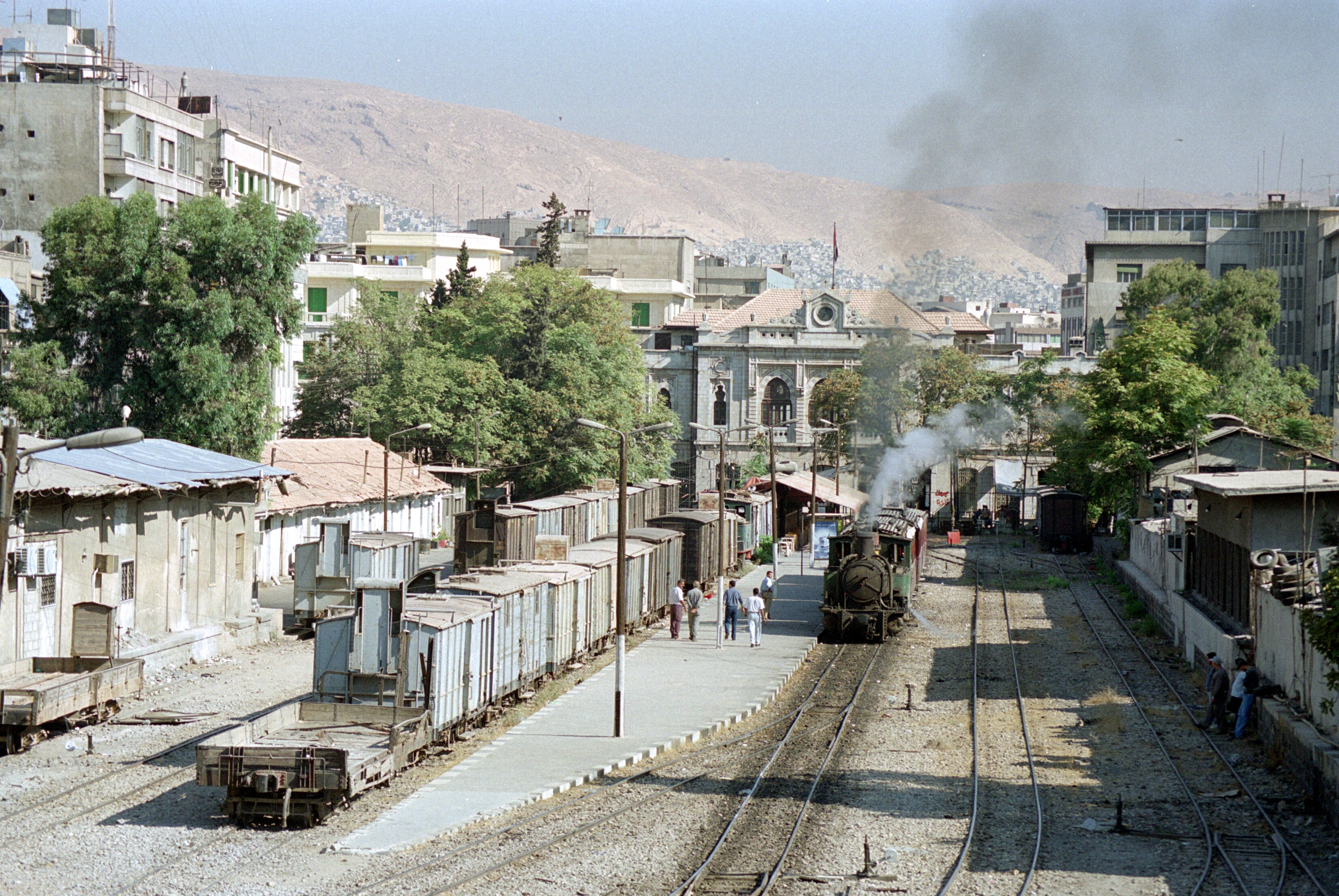
Steam excursion train at Kanawat station, Damascus, Syria, in 2000

== See also ==
- Arab Mashreq International Railway, planned network in the eastern part of the Arab world
- Haramain high-speed railway (built 2009–2018) between Mecca and Medina
- Baghdad Railway (built 1903–1940), initially a German-Ottoman project
- Similar gauges
- Transport in Jordan

Ottoman Palestine railways

- Eastern Railway, Ottoman WWI line, Tulkarm to Hadera and Tulkarm to Lydda; connected to Jezreel Valley, Jaffa–Jerusalem, and Beersheba lines
- Jaffa–Jerusalem railway (inaugurated 1892)
- Railway to Beersheba or the 'Egyptian Branch', Ottoman WWI line headed towards the Suez Canal; two lines: (Lidda–) Wadi Surar–Beit Hanoun, and Wadi Surar–Beersheba

Mandate Palestine & Israel railways

- Palestine Railways, government-owned company and rail monopolist in Mandate Palestine (1920–1948)
- Rail transport in Israel
  - Coastal railway line, Israel, main line in Mandate Palestine and Israel
  - Israel Railways, the state-owned principal railway company in Israel
