= Tareq Khouri =

Jordanian businessman

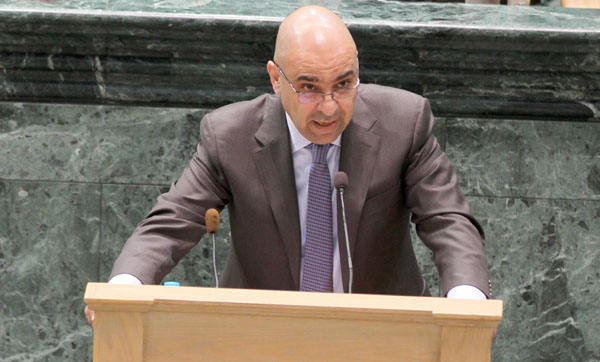
Tareq Khouri

Tareq Sami Hanna Khouri (Arabic: طارق سامي حنا خوري; 1 December 1967 in Amman) is a Jordanian businessman and politician. He has served multiple terms as a member of the Jordanian House of Representatives and is a former president of Al-Wehdat SC, one of Jordan's most prominent football clubs.

== Political career ==
Khouri has been elected to the Jordanian House of Representatives across multiple terms, representing the first electoral district of the Zarqa Governorate on the christian quota seat.

He served in the 17th Parliament, during which he received 10,424 votes in the 2007 elections. He lost his bid for re-election in the November 2010 elections and subsequently won election to the 18th Parliament.

During his parliamentary service, Khouri chaired the Jordanian-Syrian Parliamentary Friendship Committee and led parliamentary friendship committees with Iraq, Palestine, Syria, and Lebanon.
