= Mudawwara =

Mudawwara 'المدورة
- Village
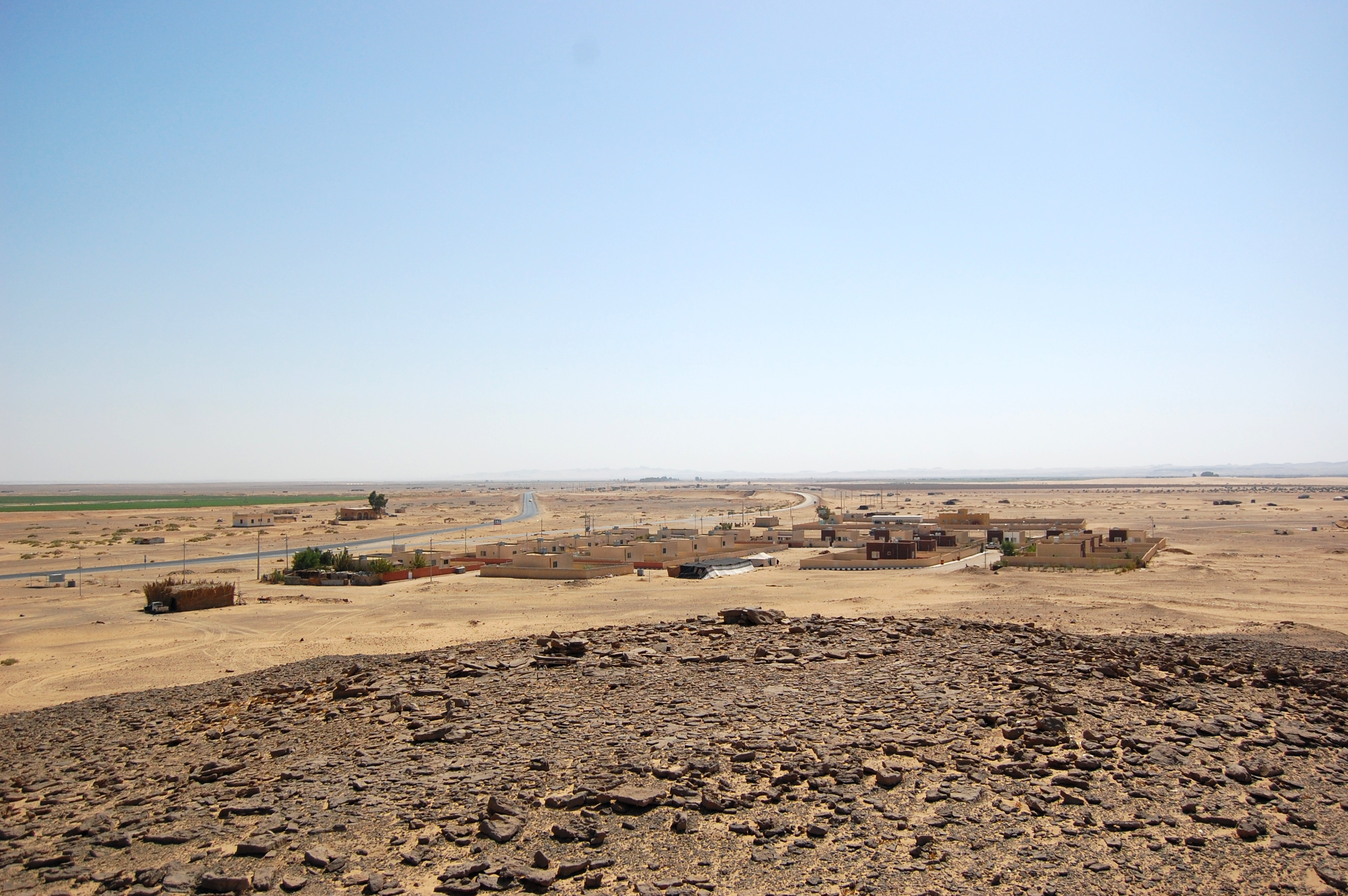
- Looking south, the Hejaz railway station building in the distance behind the village
- Etymology: A large round thing
- Location in Jordan
- Coordinates: 29.333505°N 36.025270°E
- Country: Jordan
- Governorate: Ma'an Governorate

Population (2015)
  - Total: 691
- Time zone: UTC + 2

Mudawwara (Arabic: 'المدورة) is the most southerly settlement in Jordan. It is administratively part of the Ma'an Governorate. The village had a population of 691 in the 2015 census.

== Etymology ==
The Arabic toponym, Mudawwara, translates approximately to "a large round thing" but does not refer to the many green, circular irrigated agriculture plots that can be found in the area, rather to a group of conical hills 3 kilometres (1.9 mi) to the northwest of the modern town.

== History ==
Mudawwara is first mentioned in the 9th century as one of the principal stops on the Syrian Hajj route. It appears to have been by-passed in the 14th century and is listed again in the 16th century.

Transport and communications, together with that all-important of desert commodities, water, have been the raisons d'être of this settlement for centuries. Mudawwara lies on the traditional trade route that links with the wider Mediterranean world, the Levant and greater Syria with the Arabian Peninsula all the way down to Yemen. This route has been used for thousands of years by nomads and traders. From the seventh century onwards Islam spread across the North African coastal strip and through what is today the Middle East. The followers of Islam who were required to make the Hajj pilgrimage to the holy cities of Medina and Mecca travelled through this area along ancient routes. During the Umayyad period (AD 661-750) a route from Syria and Anatolia developed and passed through the settlements of Ma'an and Mudawwara.

Mudawwara was thrust into modernity and the twentieth century with the arrival of the telegraph in 1900 connecting this remote outpost with the centre of Ottoman control in Constantinople. Shortly afterwards the Hejaz railway arrived in 1906 connecting it to Damascus, 572 kilometres (355 mi) to the north, and Medina, 730 kilometres (450 mi) to the south.

T. E. Lawrence led an attack on the railway in September 1917 during the Arab Revolt. Destroying a bridge along the line between Mudawwara Station and Hallat Ammar Station, the attack also took out 2 locomotives pulling 10 box wagons of Turkish soldiers. The result was 70 Turkish soldiers killed, 30 wounded and 90 taken prisoner. The station was captured during the Battle of Mudawwara on 8 August 1918, along with 80 miles of Hejaz railway to Ma'an, and 7 stations.

== The village ==
The modern village of Mudawwara has grown alongside the N5 Highway that heads southwards toward the border post with Saudi Arabia. It comprises low concrete block buildings and a few stores and vehicle repair shops. The many telecommunications towers link the village and the security posts to the administrative centres in Ma'an.

== Ottoman fort ==
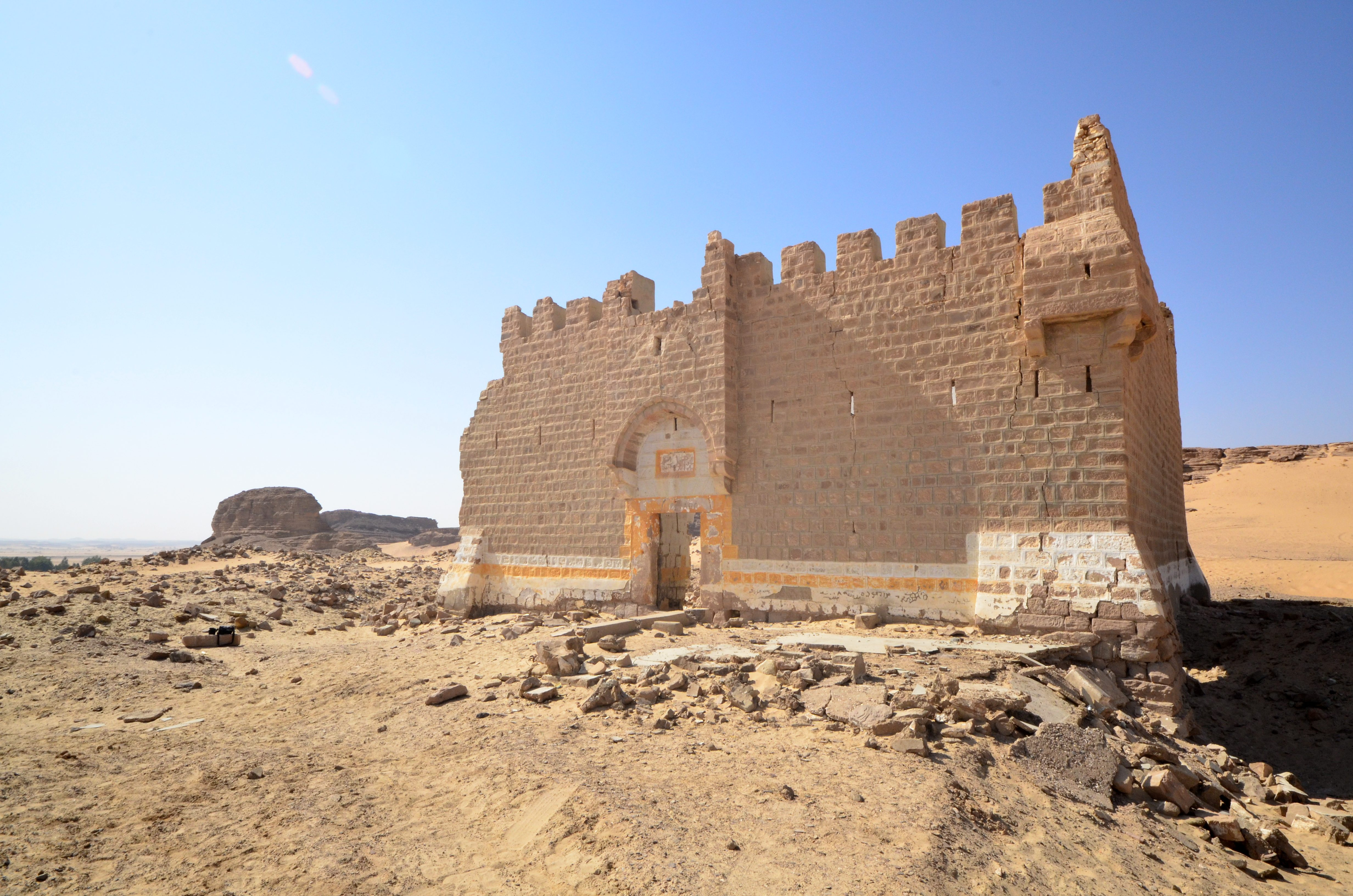
The Ottoman Fort at Mudawwara

A large stone fort, Qalat Mudawwara, was constructed in the 18th century by the Ottoman administration to afford protection to the hajj pilgrims. There are references to a fortification at this site as early as the 9th and 16th centuries. The first Western description of the fort is given by Charles Montagu Doughty in an account first published in 1888. He describes Medowwara (sic) "...the kellat Medowwara, where we came to water. The place lies very desolate; the fort is built at a spring, defended now by a vault from the Beduin's hostility. We felt the noon here very sultry and the sun glancing again from the sand we were between two heats. ..."

This was used as a first aid post by Major Buxton during the attack on Mudawwara in August 1918 and was reused by Glubb Pasha during the mid-20th century.

The fort was vandalised, in the 1980s, by looters using bulldozers looking for gold and causing the south elevation to collapse. Today it can be found, in a state of imminent collapse, 7 kilometres (4.3 mi) to the west of the station.

== The Hejaz railway ==
The Hejaz railway, the 1,400 kilometres (870 mi) pilgrim railway that linked Damascus with Medinah, arrived in Mudawwara in 1905. Mudawwara was an important stop as it was one of only six stations along the entire railway that had water reserves. A water tower comprising "two 50 cubic-meter iron tanks on a stone tower", wind- and steam-operated pumps were constructed to extract and store water.
