= Doluca =

Doluca may refer to the following places in Turkey:

- Doluca, Batman, a village in the district of Batman, Batman Province
- Doluca, Çayırlı
- Doluca, Gümüşhacıköy, a village in the district of Gümüşhacıköy, Amasya Province
- Doluca, Kahta, a village in the district of Kahta, Adıyaman Province
- Doluca, Tercan
