= Çayönü (disambiguation) =

Çayönü can refer to:

- Çayönü
- Çayönü, Çayırlı
- Çayönü, Kozluk
- Çayönü, Mudanya
- Çayönü or Kalopsida, a village in Cyprus
