= Büyük Yaylaköy, Çayırlı =

Village in Erzincan Province, Turkey

Büyük Yaylaköy
- Village
- Location within Turkey
- Coordinates: 39.767°N 40.003°E
- Country: Turkey
- Province: Erzincan
- District: Çayırlı
- Population (2021): 114
- Time zone: UTC+3 (TRT)

Büyük Yaylaköy (Kurdish: Gelmîzî) is a village in the Çayırlı District, Erzincan Province, Turkey. The village is populated by Kurds and had a population of 114 in 2021.

The hamlets of Ahmetağa, Akdoğan, Direkli, Kayınlık and Kümbeler are attached to the village.

== History ==
In 1835, the village of Kelmizi (Büyük Yayla) was part of the Tercan District. The male population of Kelmizi at that time was 0 Muslims and 35 non-Muslims.
