= Verimli =

Verimli can refer to:

- Verimli, Çayırlı
- Verimli, Tarsus
