= Çataksu =

Çataksu can refer to:

- Çataksu, Çayırlı
- Çataksu, Olur
- Çataksu, Sur
