= Pınarlı =

Pınarlı can refer to:

- Pınarlı, Baskil
- Pınarlı, Bozdoğan
- Pınarlı, Çayırlı
- Pınarlı, Çermik
- Pınarlı, Dinar
- Pınarlı, Hopa
- Pınarlı, Horasan
- Pınarlı, İspir
- Pınarlı, Şavşat
- the Turkish name for Vitsada
