= Akyurt (disambiguation) =

Akyurt is a district in the Ankara Province, Turkey

Akyurt may also refer to:

- Akyurt, Tercan, village in the Tercan District, Erzincan Province, Turkey
- Village in Hamur District, Ağrı Province, Turkey
- Hamlet in Uludam, Adıyaman, village in the Adıyaman District, Adıyaman Province, Turkey
- Hamlet in Dereli, Pertek, village in the Pertek District, Tunceli Province, Turkey
- Akyurt, Tokat, village in Merkez district, Tokat Province, Turkey
