= Oğulveren, Tercan =

Village in Erzincan Province, Turkey

Oğulveren
- Village
- Location in Turkey
- Coordinates: 39.640°N 40.613°E
- Country: Turkey
- Province: Erzincan
- District: Tercan
- Population (2021): 259
- Time zone: UTC+3 (TRT)

Oğulveren (Kurdish: Gevrencî) is a village in the Tercan, Erzincan, Turkey. The village is populated by Kurds of the Lolan tribe and had a population of 259 in 2021.
