= Saygılı =

Saygılı can refer to:

- Saygılı, Çayırlı
- Saygılı, Suluova
