= Yürekli =

Yürekli can refer to the following places in Turkey:

- Yürekli, Elazığ, a village in Elazığ Province
- Yürekli, Çayırlı
- Yürekli, İvrindi
