= Çadırkaya, Tercan =

Village in Erzincan Province, Turkey

Çadırkaya
- Municipality
- Location in Turkey
- Coordinates: 39.842°N 40.225°E
- Country: Turkey
- Province: Erzincan
- District: Tercan
- Population (2021): 2,013
- Time zone: UTC+3 (TRT)

Çadırkaya (Armenian: Բագառիճ, romanized: Bagarich; Zazaki: Pakariz) is a municipality (belde) in the Tercan District, Erzincan Province, Turkey. It had a population of 2,013 in 2021. Bagayarich (also spelled Bagayarič, Bagarich or Bagarinch) was an ancient locality in the northwestern part of Armenia in the district of Daranali (or Daranałi[k]). In ancient times, it housed the cult centre of the divinity Mihr (Mithra i.e. Mithras), the god of fire.

The neighborhoods of the municipality are Camii Kebir, Gözeler and Yeni. It is the birthplace of Soghomon Tehlirian, a famous Armenian revolutionary and assassin of Talaat Pasha, one of the architects of the Armenian genocide.

On the eve of World War I, before the Armenian genocide, the Armenian Patriarchate of Constantinople indicated that the town's population consisted of 1060 Armenians (in 182 houses), 750 Turks and 125 Zazas. It also harboured a medieval cathedral, a church, an Armenian school with 70 students as well as the ruins of a pagan temple dedicated to Mihr. Statistics published by A-Do, compiled using data from the secretary of the Armenian church in Erzurum from around 1910, record 150 Armenian and 150 Muslim households within the settlement; Teotig notes 182 Armenian families there.

== Name ==
The name of Bagayarich is attested in Greek by the ancient geographer and historian Strabo (died c. 24 AD) as *Bagaris and Basgoidariza, and by Ptolemy (died c. 170 AD), likewise in Greek, as *Bagarizaka. The modern Turkish name is Pekeriç, and its new official name of Çadırkaya means "tent-rock".

== Geography ==
Bagayarich is located near the northeastern corner of the Pekeriç plain. This plain is separated from the Vican plain downstream on the Tuzla Su by a series of low hills. Bagayarich itself is located at the base of a large conical rock which historically was the site of the town's fortress. The village consists of two distinct "lobes".

In ancient times, the locality of Bagayarich was situated on the primary road passing through northern Armenia that linked the town of Sebastaea (present-day Sivas) in the Roman Empire with Ecbatana (present-day Hamadan) in Media through Satala, Bagayarich, Karin (present-day Erzurum) and Artaxata (Artashat).

== History ==
The locality was known for being the site of the important temple of Mihr (i.e. Mithra, Mithras), that is, one of the eight main pagan shrines of pre-Christian Armenia. It was traditionally held to have been built by King Tigranes the Great (r. 95-56 BC). The site first appears in Armenian historiography in late antique works. Within this context, according to Agathangelos, the temple of Mihr at Bagayarich was destroyed by Gregory the Illuminator. The modern historian Robert H. Hewsen explains that the entire surrounding district of Daranali may have been part of the domain of the aforementioned Mihr temple, as, after it was destroyed during the conversion of Armenia to Christianity, the district of Daranali was turned into the property of the Armenian church.

Bagayarich was historically the capital of the district of Derzene. It has since been superseded by the town of Tercan, which perhaps took place in the early Ottoman period.

During the Ottoman-Russian War of 1828-1829, Russia invaded Eastern Anatolia, and after the war, the Russians took possibly 100,000 Armenians back with them to Russian territory, including 47 households from the Tercan area, especially from Pekeriç, Piriz (Çaykent), and Zağgeri (Büklümdere).

In 1835, the male population of Pekeriç included 146 Muslims and 197 non-Muslims, for a total population of 343 males.

By the 20th century, Bagayarich was composed of two adjoining villages by the name of Verin ("upper") and Nerkin ("lower") Bagayarich, which respectively consisted of 80 and 130 homes. Half of these homes were inhabited by Armenians and the other half by local Muslims. The two villages of Verin and Nerkin Bagayarich together formed the larger village in the caza ("district") of Derjan. At the time, the remains of what may have been the temple as well as an old castle could still be viewed at Bagayarich.

== Present status ==
The site's main focus in the present day is a conical hill. A simple radio tower is located at the peak of the site including some remnants of rough stone-and-mortar masonry dating back to the 19th or 20th century.

== Sources ==
- Canepa, Matthew P. (2018). The Iranian Expanse: Transforming Royal Identity through Architecture, Landscape, and the Built Environment, 550 BCE–642 CE. University of California Press. ISBN 978-0520964365.
- Hewsen, R. H. (1988). "BAGAYAṞIČ". In Yarshater, Ehsan (ed.). Encyclopædia Iranica. Vol. III/4: Bačča(-ye) Saqqā–Bahai Faith III. London and New York: Routledge & Kegan Paul. p. 408. ISBN 978-0-71009-116-1.
- La Porta, Sergio (2018). "Zoroastrianism, Armenian". In Nicholson, Oliver (ed.). The Oxford Dictionary of Late Antiquity. Oxford: Oxford University Press. ISBN 978-0-19-866277-8.
