= Elaldı =

Elaldı can refer to:

- Elaldı, Tercan
- Elaldı, Vezirköprü
