= Yaylakent =

Yaylakent can refer to:

- Yaylakent, Çayırlı
- Yaylakent, Orta
