= Tosunlar =

Tosunlar can refer to:

- Tosunlar, Çayırlı
- Tosunlar, Devrek
- Tosunlar, Sarayköy
