= Chalcaea =

Town of ancient Thrace

Coordinates: 41°11′18″N 29°04′47″E

Chalcaea was a town of ancient Thrace, inhabited during Roman times.

Its site is located near Sırataş in European Turkey.
