= Tepebaşı, Tercan =

Village in Erzincan Province, Turkey

Tepebaşı
- Village
- Location within Turkey
- Coordinates: 39.665°N 40.484°E
- Country: Turkey
- Province: Erzincan
- District: Tercan
- Population (2021): 33
- Time zone: UTC+3 (TRT)

Tepebaşı is a village in the Tercan District, Erzincan Province, Turkey. The village is populated by Kurds of the Lolan tribe and had a population of 33 in 2021.
