= Yaylacık, Tercan =

Village in Erzincan Province, Turkey

Yaylacık
- Village
- Location within Turkey
- Coordinates: 39.789°N 40.481°E
- Country: Turkey
- Province: Erzincan
- District: Tercan
- Population (2021): 164
- Time zone: UTC+3 (TRT)

Yaylacık is a village in the Tercan District, Erzincan Province, Turkey. The village is populated by Kurds of the Aşûran and Lolan tribes and had a population of 164 in 2021.

The hamlets of Akifağa, Ayvalı, Çinar, Dararazi and Küplüce are attached to the village.
