= Çaykent, Çayırlı =

Village in Erzincan Province, Turkey

Çaykent
- Village
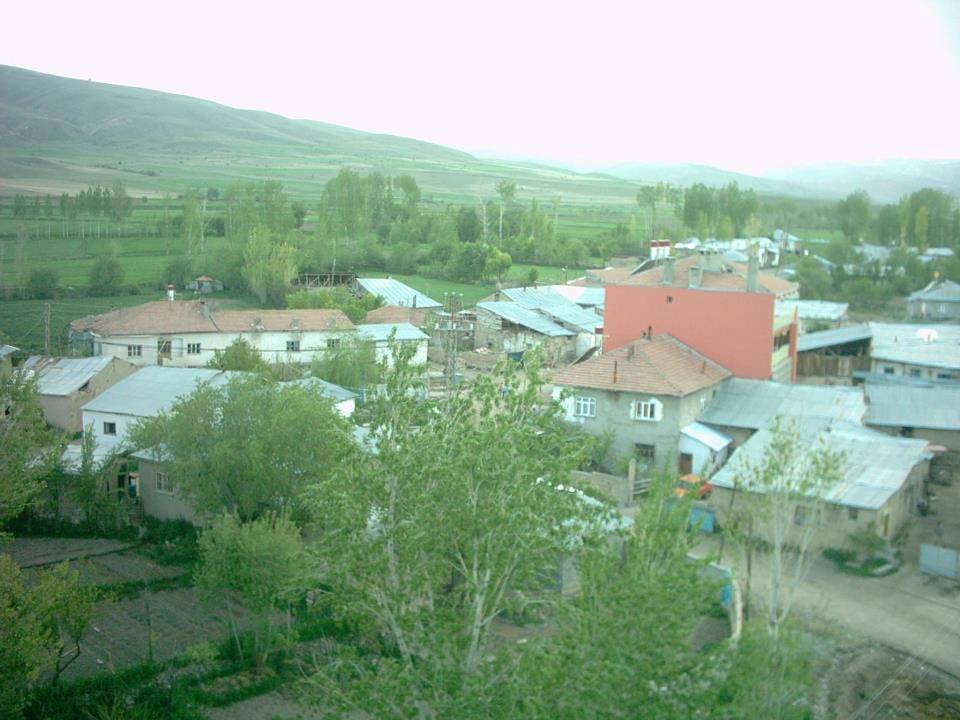

- Location within Turkey
- Coordinates: 39.808°N 40.159°E
- Country: Turkey
- Province: Erzincan
- District: Çayırlı
- Population (2022): 201
- Time zone: UTC+3 (TRT)

Çaykent is a village in the Çayırlı District, Erzincan Province, Turkey. The village had a population of 201 in 2022.

The hamlet of Beyinağılı is attached to it.

== Population ==
Historical population

Year	Pop.	±% p.a.
1965	1,273	—
1970	1,188	−1.37%
1975	339	−22.18%
1980	1,457	+33.86%
1985	1,619	+2.13%
1990	807	−13.00%

Year	Pop.	±% p.a.
1997	427	−8.69%
2007	489	+1.37%
2012	276	−10.81%
2017	215	−4.87%
2022	201	−1.34%

Source: Population censuses (1965-1997) and TÜIK (2007-2022)

== History ==
During the Ottoman-Russian War of 1828-1829, Russia invaded Eastern Anatolia, and after the war, the Russians took possibly 100,000 Armenians back with them to Russian territory, including 47 households from the Tercan area, especially from Pekeriç (Çadırkaya), Piriz (Çaykent), and Zağgeri (Büklümdere).

In 1835, Piriz (Çaykent) was part of the Tercan District. The male population of Piriz at that time was 47 Muslims and 84 non-Muslims, for a total of 131 males.
