= Gelinpınar, Çayırlı =

Village in Erzincan Province, Turkey

Gelinpınar
- Village
- Location within Turkey
- Coordinates: 39.784°N 40.024°E
- Country: Turkey
- Province: Erzincan
- District: Çayırlı
- Population (2021): 55
- Time zone: UTC+3 (TRT)

Gelinpınar is a village in the Çayırlı District, Erzincan Province, Turkey. The village had a population of 55 in 2021.

== History ==
In 1835, the village of Gelinpertek (Gelinpınar) was part of the Tercan District. The male population of Gelinpertek at that time was 0 Muslims and 42 non-Muslims.
