= Beykonak =

Beykonak can refer to:

- Beykonak, Kumluca
- Beykonak, Tercan
- Beykonak, Uzunköprü
