= Balıklı =

Balıklı may refer to:

- Balıklı, Istanbul, a quarter
  - Church of St. Mary of the Spring (Istanbul) or Balıklı Meryem Ana Rum Manastiri
- Balıklı, Altıeylül, a neighbourhood in Balıkesir Province, Turkey
- Balıklı, Arhavi, a village in Artvin Province, Turkey
- Balıklı, Çayırlı, a village in Erzincan Province, Turkey
- Balıklı, Ezine, a village in Çanakkale Province, Turkey
- Balıklı, Gümüşhacıköy, a village in Amasya Province, Turkey
- Balıklı, Musabeyli, a village in Kilis Province, Turkey

== See also ==
- Zorakert or Balykhly, a village in Shirak Province, Armenia
