= Çilligöl =

Çilligöl can refer to:

- Çilligöl, Çayırlı
- Çilligöl, Hınıs
