= Paşayurdu =

Paşayurdu can refer to:

- Paşayurdu, Aziziye
- Paşayurdu, Çayırlı
