= Güzbulak, Tercan =

Village in Erzincan Province, Turkey

Güzbulak
- Village
- Location within Turkey
- Coordinates: 39.717°N 40.556°E
- Country: Turkey
- Province: Erzincan
- District: Tercan
- Population (2021): 133
- Time zone: UTC+3 (TRT)

Güzbulak (Kurmanji Kurdish: Pelêgozê) is a village in the Tercan District, Erzincan Province, Turkey. The village is populated by Kurds of the Lolan tribe and had a population of 133 in 2021.

The hamlets of Alancık, Hasbey, İbrahim and Koyunlu are attached to the village.
