= Harmantepe =

Harmantepe can refer to:

- Harmantepe, Adilcevaz
- Harmantepe, Çayırlı
- Harmantepe, Elâzığ
