= Sucuali, Tercan =

Village in Turkey

Sucuali
- Neighbourhood
- Country: Turkey
- Province: Erzincan
- District: Tercan
- Municipality: Kargın
- Population (2022): 50
- Time zone: UTC+3 (TRT)

Sucuali is a neighbourhood of the town Kargın, Tercan District, Erzincan Province, Turkey. Its population is 50 (2022).
