= Yaylalar =

Yaylalar can refer to:

- Yaylalar, Bayburt
- Yaylalar, Çayırlı
- Yaylalar, Lapseki
- Yaylalar, Yusufeli
