= Çalkışla, Tercan =

Village in Erzincan Province, Turkey

Çalkışla
- Village
- Location within Turkey
- Coordinates: 39.771°N 40.444°E
- Country: Turkey
- Province: Erzincan
- District: Tercan
- Population (2021): 22
- Time zone: UTC+3 (TRT)

Çalkışla (Kurdish: Çirkiz) is a village in the Tercan District, Erzincan Province, Turkey. The village is populated by Kurds of the Şadiyan tribe and had a population of 22 in 2021.

The hamlets of Aşağıçalkışla, Bahçecik, Bıyıkören, Düztaş and Yoluca are attached to the village.
