= Küçükağa, Tercan =

Village in Erzincan Province, Turkey

Küçükağa
- Village
- Location within Turkey
- Coordinates: 39.855°N 40.296°E
- Country: Turkey
- Province: Erzincan
- District: Tercan
- Population (2021): 14
- Time zone: UTC+3 (TRT)

Küçükağa is a village in the Tercan District, Erzincan Province, Turkey. The village is populated by Kurds of the Arel and Hormek tribes and had a population of 14 in 2021.
