= Konarlı, Tercan =

Village in Erzincan Province, Turkey

Konarlı
- Village
- Location within Turkey
- Coordinates: 39.610°N 40.522°E
- Country: Turkey
- Province: Erzincan
- District: Tercan
- Population (2021): 161
- Time zone: UTC+3 (TRT)

Konarlı (Kurdish: Şix) is a village in the Tercan District, Erzincan Province, Turkey. The village is populated by Kurds of the Çarekan and Haydaran tribes and had a population of 161 in 2021.

The hamlets of Aktepe, Aslancayırı, Aşağıcemal, Aşağıkonarlı, Aşağıkuşluca, Bahçe, Beşparmak, Boğaziçi, Bük, Eğlence, Göl, Hacıhüseyin, Kamer, Karabaş, Karşıkarabaş, Kavacık, Közme, Kütuklü, Serince, Sümerli, Şakirağa, Tuğlu, Yukarıaktepe, Yukarıcemal and Yukarıkuşluca are attached to the village.
