= Bağpınar, Tercan =

Village in Erzincan Province, Turkey

Bağpınar
- Village
- Location within Turkey
- Coordinates: 39.713°N 40.276°E
- Country: Turkey
- Province: Erzincan
- District: Tercan
- Population (2021): 93
- Time zone: UTC+3 (TRT)

Bağpınar (Kurdish: Kotur) is a village in the Tercan District, Erzincan Province, Turkey. The village is populated by Kurds of the Şadiyan tribe and had a population of 93 in 2021.
