= Elmalı, Tercan =

Village in Erzincan Province, Turkey

Elmalı
- Village
- Location within Turkey
- Coordinates: 39.624°N 40.055°E
- Country: Turkey
- Province: Erzincan
- District: Tercan
- Population (2021): 16
- Time zone: UTC+3 (TRT)

Elmalı is a village in the Tercan District, Erzincan Province, Turkey. The village is populated by Kurds of the Balaban tribe and had a population of 16 in 2021.

The hamlets of Çamlık, Gümüşsu and Küçükelmalı are attached to the village.
