= Göller, Çayırlı =

Village in Erzincan Province, Turkey

Göller
- Village
- Location within Turkey
- Coordinates: 39.794°N 39.972°E
- Country: Turkey
- Province: Erzincan
- District: Çayırlı
- Population (2021): 30
- Time zone: UTC+3 (TRT)

Göller is a village in the Çayırlı District, Erzincan Province, Turkey. The village had a population of 30 in 2021.

The hamlets of Aktaş and Deliktaş are attached to the village.
