= Bozağa, Çayırlı =

Village in Erzincan Province, Turkey

Bozağa
- Village
- Location within Turkey
- Coordinates: 39.866°N 40.058°E
- Country: Turkey
- Province: Erzincan
- District: Çayırlı
- Population (2021): 59
- Time zone: UTC+3 (TRT)

Bozağa is a village in the Çayırlı District, Erzincan Province, Turkey. The village is populated by Kurds and had a population of 59 in 2021.
