= Kuzören, Tercan =

Village in Erzincan Province, Turkey

Kuzören
- Village
- Location within Turkey
- Coordinates: 39.699°N 40.466°E
- Country: Turkey
- Province: Erzincan
- District: Tercan
- Population (2021): 73
- Time zone: UTC+3 (TRT)

Kuzören (Kurdish: Quzveren) is a village in the Tercan District, Erzincan Province, Turkey. The village is populated by Kurds and had a population of 73 in 2021.
