= Yukarıçamurdere, Çayırlı =

Village in Erzincan Province, Turkey

Yukarıçamurdere
- Village
- Location within Turkey
- Coordinates: 39.821°N 39.955°E
- Country: Turkey
- Province: Erzincan
- District: Çayırlı
- Population (2021): 75
- Time zone: UTC+3 (TRT)

Yukarıçamurdere is a village in the Çayırlı District, Erzincan Province, Turkey. The village is populated by Kurds of the Arel tribe and had a population of 75 in 2021.
