= Topalhasan, Tercan =

Village in Erzincan Province, Turkey

Topalhasan
- Village
- Location within Turkey
- Coordinates: 39.795°N 40.356°E
- Country: Turkey
- Province: Erzincan
- District: Tercan
- Population (2021): 21
- Time zone: UTC+3 (TRT)

Topalhasan is a village in the Tercan District, Erzincan Province, Turkey. The village had a population of 21 in 2021.
