= Çatakdere, Tercan =

Village in Erzincan Province, Turkey

Çatakdere
- Village
- Location within Turkey
- Coordinates: 39.797°N 40.289°E
- Country: Turkey
- Province: Erzincan
- District: Tercan
- Population (2021): 22
- Time zone: UTC+3 (TRT)

Çatakdere is a village in the Tercan District, Erzincan Province, Turkey. The village is populated by Kurds of the Botikan tribe and had a population of 22 in 2021.
