= Bulmuş, Tercan =

Village in Erzincan Province, Turkey

Bulmuş
- Village
- Location within Turkey
- Coordinates: 39.659°N 40.105°E
- Country: Turkey
- Province: Erzincan
- District: Tercan
- Population (2021): 129
- Time zone: UTC+3 (TRT)

Bulmuş is a village in the Tercan District, Erzincan Province, Turkey. The village is populated by Kurds of the Balaban tribe and had a population of 129 in 2021.

The hamlets of Balabanlı, Boyacı, Karabeyler, Kurtdere, Palanka and Petekçi are attached to the village.
