= Fındıklı, Tercan =

Village in Erzincan Province, Turkey

Fındıklı
- Village
- Location within Turkey
- Coordinates: 39.705°N 40.518°E
- Country: Turkey
- Province: Erzincan
- District: Tercan
- Population (2021): 59
- Time zone: UTC+3 (TRT)

Fındıklı is a village in the Tercan District, Erzincan Province, Turkey. The village is populated by Kurds and had a population of 59 in 2021.

The hamlets of Danacık and Yavancı are attached to the village.
