= Hacıbayram, Tercan =

Village in Erzincan Province, Turkey

Hacıbayram
- Village
- Location within Turkey
- Coordinates: 39.823°N 40.495°E
- Country: Turkey
- Province: Erzincan
- District: Tercan
- Population (2021): 12
- Time zone: UTC+3 (TRT)

Hacıbayram is a village in the Tercan District, Erzincan Province, Turkey. The village had a population of 12 in 2021.

The hamlets of Duraklı and Rızabey are attached to the village.
