= Eşmepınar, Çayırlı =

Village in Erzincan Province, Turkey

Eşmepınar
- Village
- Location within Turkey
- Coordinates: 39.887°N 39.907°E
- Country: Turkey
- Province: Erzincan
- District: Çayırlı
- Population (2021): 78
- Time zone: UTC+3 (TRT)

Eşmepınar is a village in the Çayırlı District, Erzincan Province, Turkey. The village is populated by Kurds of the Kurêşan tribe and had a population of 78 in 2021.
