= Çayırlı District =

District of Erzincan Province, Turkey

- District
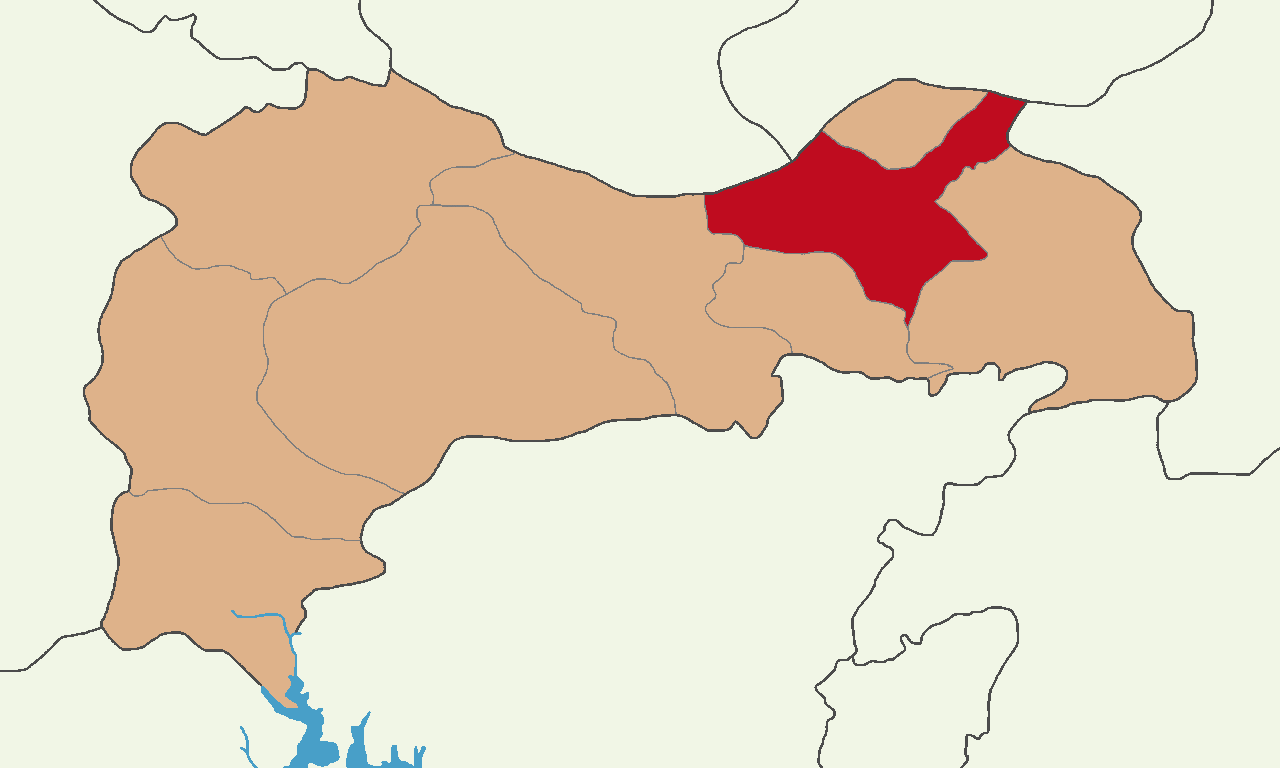
- Map showing Çayırlı District in Erzincan Province

- Location in Turkey
- Coordinates: 39°48′N 40°02′E
- Country: Turkey
- Province: Erzincan
- Seat: Çayırlı
- Area: 1,062 km^{2} (410 sq mi)
- Population (2021): 8,383
  - Density: 7.9/km^{2} (20/sq mi)
- Time zone: UTC+3 (TRT)
- Website: www.cayirli.gov.tr

Çayırlı District is a district of Erzincan Province in Turkey. The municipality of Çayırlı is the seat and the district had a population of 8,383 in 2021. Its area is 1,062 km^{2}.

The district was established in 1954.

== Composition ==
The district encompasses one municipality (Çayırlı), forty-eight villages and thirty-one hamlets.

The villages are:

- Aşağıkartallı
- Balıklı
- Başköy
- Boybeyi
- Bozağa
- Bölükova
- Büyükgelengeç
- Büyük Yaylaköy
- Cennetpınar
- Coşan
- Çamurdere
- Çataksu
- Çaykent
- Çayönü
- Çilhoroz
- Çilligöl
- Doğanyuva
- Doluca
- Esendoruk
- Eşmepınar
- Gelinpınar
- Göller
- Harmantepe
- Hastarla
- Karataş
- Küçükgelengeç
- Mazlumağa
- Mirzaoğlu
- Oğultaşı
- Ortaçat
- Ozanlı
- Paşayurdu
- Pınarlı
- Saraycık
- Sarıgüney
- Saygılı
- Sırataş
- Toprakkale
- Tosunlar
- Turnaçayırı
- Verimli
- Yaylakent
- Yaylalar
- Yazıkaya
- Yeşilyaka
- Yukarıçamurdere
- Yukarıkartallı
- Yürekli

== Religion ==
In 1989, anthropologist Andrews counted 64 villages in the district of which Alevis were present in 54 villages and Sunni Muslims in 13 villages.
