= Ilısu, Tercan =

Village in Erzincan Province, Turkey

Ilısu
- Village
- Location within Turkey
- Coordinates: 39.620°N 40.596°E
- Country: Turkey
- Province: Erzincan
- District: Tercan
- Population (2021): 101
- Time zone: UTC+3 (TRT)

Ilısu (Kurdish: Çerme) is a village in the Tercan District, Erzincan Province, Turkey. The village had a population of 101 in 2021.

The hamlets of Aşağıtepecik, Beşikçayır, Dereçayırı and Yukarıtepecik are attached to the village.
