= Yeşilyaka, Çayırlı =

Village in Erzincan Province, Turkey

Yeşilyaka
- Village
- Location within Turkey
- Coordinates: 39.852°N 39.962°E
- Country: Turkey
- Province: Erzincan
- District: Çayırlı
- Population (2021): 166
- Time zone: UTC+3 (TRT)

Yeşilyaka (Kurdish: Şebge) is a village in the Çayırlı District, Erzincan Province, Turkey. The village had a population of 166 in 2021.
