= Başbudak, Tercan =

Village in Erzincan Province, Turkey

Başbudak
- Village
- Location within Turkey
- Coordinates: 39.657°N 40.652°E
- Country: Turkey
- Province: Erzincan
- District: Tercan
- Population (2021): 386
- Time zone: UTC+3 (TRT)

Başbudak is a village in the Tercan District, Erzincan Province, Turkey. The village is populated by Kurds of the Abdalan tribe and had a population of 386 in 2021.

The hamlets of Alibeykomu, Esentepe, Harhurunkomu, Kesmetaş and Sağır are attached to the village.
