= Darıtepe, Tercan =

Village in Erzincan Province, Turkey

Darıtepe
- Village
- Location within Turkey
- Coordinates: 39.732°N 40.466°E
- Country: Turkey
- Province: Erzincan
- District: Tercan
- Population (2021): 34
- Time zone: UTC+3 (TRT)

Darıtepe is a village in the Tercan District, Erzincan Province, Turkey. The village had a population of 34 in 2021.

The hamlet of Demirkapı is attached to the village.
