= Aşağıkartallı, Çayırlı =

Village in Erzincan Province, Turkey

Aşağıkartallı
- Village
- Location within Turkey
- Coordinates: 39.775°N 40.187°E
- Country: Turkey
- Province: Erzincan
- District: Çayırlı
- Population (2021): 78
- Time zone: UTC+3 (TRT)

Aşağıkartallı is a village in the Çayırlı District, Erzincan Province, Turkey. The village is populated by Kurds of the Alan tribe and has a population of 78 in 2021.
