= Karacaören, Tercan =

Village in Erzincan Province, Turkey

Karacaören
- Village
- Location within Turkey
- Coordinates: 39.814°N 40.439°E
- Country: Turkey
- Province: Erzincan
- District: Tercan
- Population (2021): 39
- Time zone: UTC+3 (TRT)

Karacaören is a village in the Tercan District, Erzincan Province, Turkey. The village had a population of 39 in 2021.

The hamlet of Erdoğdu is attached to the village.
