= Mercan, Tercan =

Village in Erzincan Province, Turkey

Mercan
- Municipality
- Location in Turkey
- Coordinates: 39.748°N 40.259°E
- Country: Turkey
- Province: Erzincan
- District: Tercan
- Population (2021): 2,077
- Time zone: UTC+3 (TRT)

Mercan is a municipality (belde) in the Tercan District, Erzincan Province, Turkey. It had a population of 2,077 in 2021.

The neighborhoods are Akşemsettin, Atatürk and Fatih.
