= Kemerçam, Tercan =

Village in Erzincan Province, Turkey

Kemerçam
- Village
- Location within Turkey
- Coordinates: 39.619°N 40.262°E
- Country: Turkey
- Province: Erzincan
- District: Tercan
- Population (2021): 53
- Time zone: UTC+3 (TRT)

Kemerçam (Kurdish: Tarî) is a village in the Tercan District, Erzincan Province, Turkey. The village is populated by Kurds of the Çarekan tribe and had a population of 53 in 2021.

The hamlets of Abbaslar, Dilek, Kemeroğlu and Kızkale are attached to the village.
