= Müftüoğlu, Tercan =

Village in Erzincan Province, Turkey

Müftüoğlu
- Village
- Location within Turkey
- Coordinates: 39.783°N 40.442°E
- Country: Turkey
- Province: Erzincan
- District: Tercan
- Population (2021): 9
- Time zone: UTC+3 (TRT)

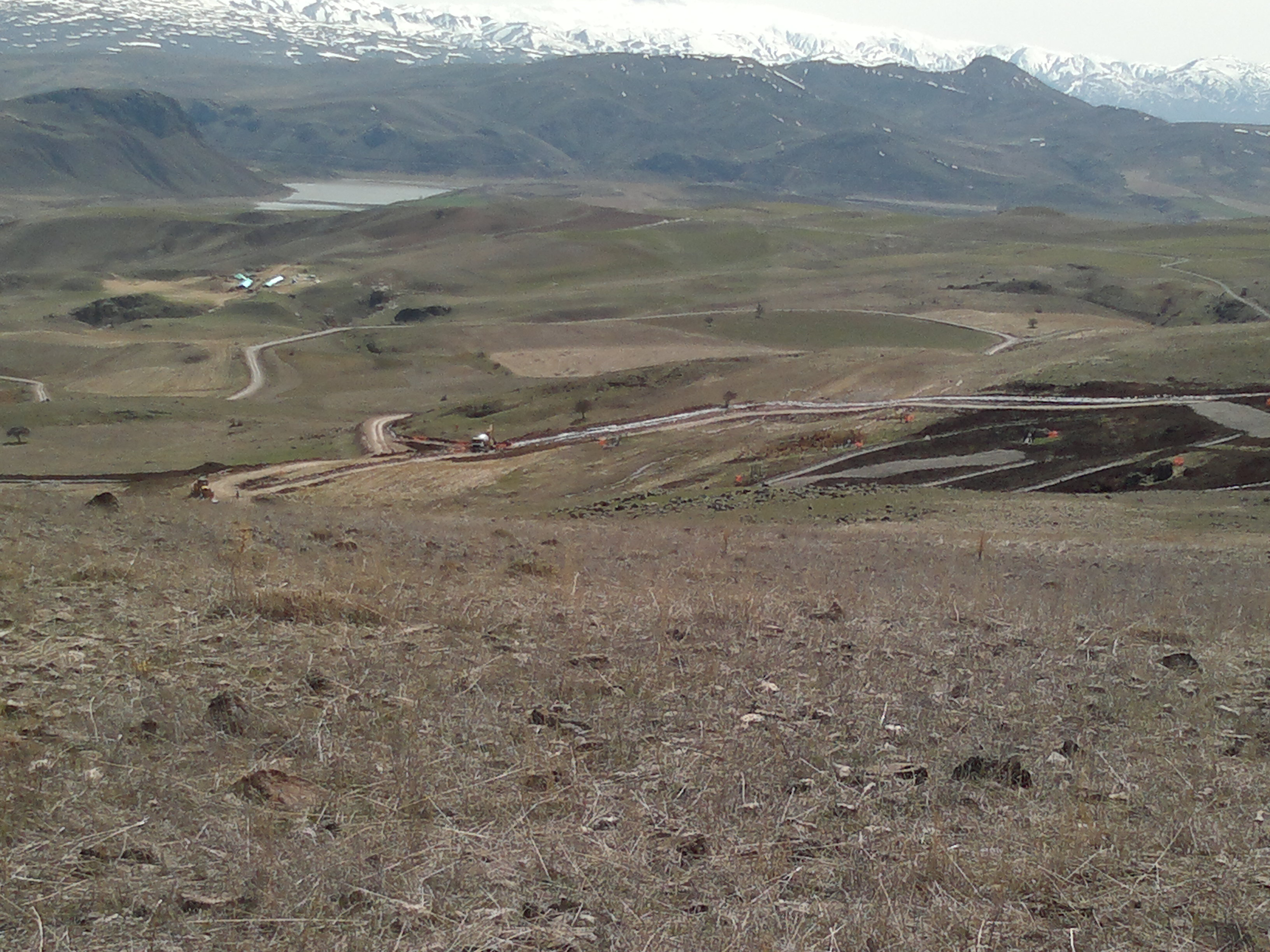
Area overlooking Müftüoğlu village in the Tercan district

Müftüoğlu is a village in the Tercan District, Erzincan Province, Turkey. The village had a population of 9 in 2021.
