= Karataş, Çayırlı =

Village in Erzincan Province, Turkey

Karataş
- Village
- Location within Turkey
- Coordinates: 39.868°N 39.672°E
- Country: Turkey
- Province: Erzincan
- District: Çayırlı
- Population (2021): 46
- Time zone: UTC+3 (TRT)

Karataş is a village in the Çayırlı District, Erzincan Province, Turkey. The village is populated by Kurds of the Kurêşan and Lolan tribes and had a population of 46 in 2021.
