= Boybeyi, Çayırlı =

Village in Erzincan Province, Turkey

Boybeyi
- Village
- Location within Turkey
- Coordinates: 39.918°N 39.891°E
- Country: Turkey
- Province: Erzincan
- District: Çayırlı
- Population (2021): 14
- Time zone: UTC+3 (TRT)

Boybeyi is a village in the Çayırlı District, Erzincan Province, Turkey. The village is populated by Kurds of the Kurêşan tribe and had a population of 14 in 2021.
