= Yuvalı, Tercan =

Village in Erzincan Province, Turkey

Yuvalı
- Village
- Location within Turkey
- Coordinates: 39.640°N 40.247°E
- Country: Turkey
- Province: Erzincan
- District: Tercan
- Population (2021): 55
- Time zone: UTC+3 (TRT)

Yuvalı (Kurdish: Axatiri) is a village in the Tercan District, Erzincan Province, Turkey. The village is populated by Kurds of the Şadiyan tribe and had a population of 55 in 2021.
