= Yazıkaya, Çayırlı =

Village in Erzincan Province, Turkey

Yazıkaya
- Village
- Location within Turkey
- Coordinates: 39.922°N 39.933°E
- Country: Turkey
- Province: Erzincan
- District: Çayırlı
- Population (2021): 251
- Time zone: UTC+3 (TRT)

Yazıkaya is a village in the Çayırlı District, Erzincan Province, Turkey. The village had a population of 251 in 2021. The hamlet of Dilek is attached to it.
