= Cennetpınar, Çayırlı =

Village in Erzincan Province, Turkey

Cennetpınar
- Village
- Location within Turkey
- Coordinates: 39°55′53″N 39°57′52″E
- Country: Turkey
- Province: Erzincan
- District: Çayırlı
- Population (2021): 213
- Time zone: UTC+3 (TRT)

Cennetpınar is a village in the Çayırlı District, Erzincan Province, Turkey. The village had a population of 213 in 2021. The hamlets of Akpınar and Perçem are attached to it.
