= Sarıkaya, Tercan =

Village in Erzincan Province, Turkey

Sarıkaya
- Village
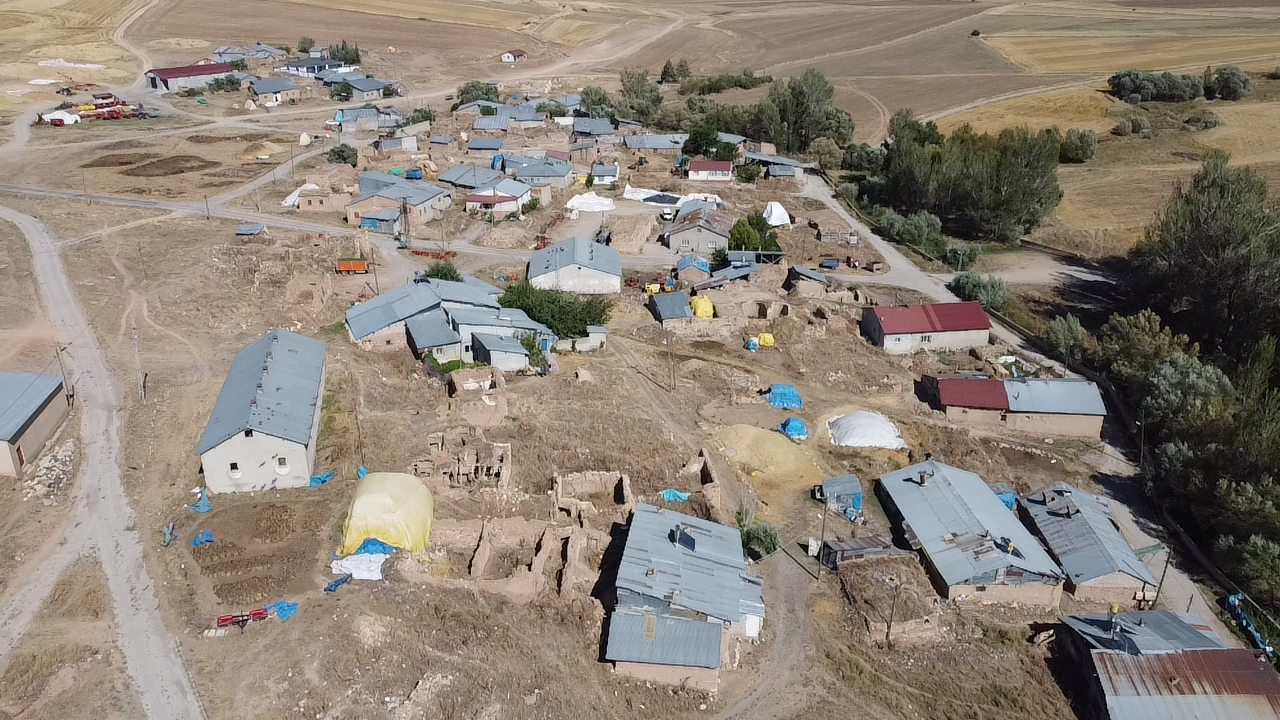

- Location within Turkey
- Coordinates: 39.706°N 40.328°E
- Country: Turkey
- Province: Erzincan
- District: Tercan
- Population (2021): 103
- Time zone: UTC+3 (TRT)

Sarıkaya is a village in the Tercan District, Erzincan Province, Turkey. The village is populated by Kurds of different tribal affiliations and had a population of 103 in 2021.
