= Aktaş, Tercan =

Village in Erzincan Province, Turkey

Aktaş
- Village
- Location within Turkey
- Coordinates: 39.811°N 40.386°E
- Country: Turkey
- Province: Erzincan
- District: Tercan
- Population (2021): 47
- Time zone: UTC+3 (TRT)

Aktaş is a village in the Tercan District, Erzincan Province, Turkey. The village had a population of 47 in 2021.

The hamlets of Altınca, Fettah, Sırmalı and Zincirli are attached to the village.
