= Köprübaşı, Tercan =

Village in Erzincan Province, Turkey

Köprübaşı
- Village
- Location within Turkey
- Coordinates: 39.727°N 40.241°E
- Country: Turkey
- Province: Erzincan
- District: Tercan
- Population (2021): 15
- Time zone: UTC+3 (TRT)

Köprübaşı is a village in the Tercan District, Erzincan Province, Turkey. The village is populated by Kurds and had a population of 15 in 2021.
