= Esenevler, Tercan =

Village in Erzincan Province, Turkey

Esenevler
- Village
- Location within Turkey
- Coordinates: 39.626°N 40.497°E
- Country: Turkey
- Province: Erzincan
- District: Tercan
- Population (2021): 174
- Time zone: UTC+3 (TRT)

Esenevler (Kurdish: Hemîpî) is a village in the Tercan District, Erzincan Province, Turkey. The village is populated by Kurds of the Aşûran and Lolan tribes and had a population of 174 in 2021.

The hamlets of Çifteler and İbrahimağa are attached to the village.
