= Büyükgelengeç, Çayırlı =

Village in Erzincan Province, Turkey

Büyükgelengeç
- Village
- Location within Turkey
- Coordinates: 39.940°N 39.832°E
- Country: Turkey
- Province: Erzincan
- District: Çayırlı
- Population (2021): 50
- Time zone: UTC+3 (TRT)

Büyükgelengeç is a village in the Çayırlı District, Erzincan Province, Turkey. The village is populated by Kurds of the Rutan tribe and had a population of 50 in 2021. The hamlet of Karagöz is attached to the village.
