= Kargın, Tercan =

Village in Erzincan Province, Turkey

Kargın
- Municipality
- Location in Turkey
- Coordinates: 39.666°N 40.196°E
- Country: Turkey
- Province: Erzincan
- District: Tercan
- Population (2021): 2,083
- Time zone: UTC+3 (TRT)

Kargın (formerly Altunkent) is a municipality (belde) in the Tercan District, Erzincan Province, Turkey. The municipality is mostly populated by Turkmens and had a population of 2,083 in 2021.

It is divided into the neighborhoods of Camii Şerif, İstasyon, Sucuali, Şehit Ahmet Aytekin and Yollarüstu (Vîcan). The settlement of Yollarüstu is populated by both Kurds and Turkmens. Sucuali is populated by Kurds of the Balaban tribe.
