= Mantarlı, Tercan =

Village in Erzincan Province, Turkey

Mantarlı
- Village
- Location within Turkey
- Coordinates: 39.739°N 40.174°E
- Country: Turkey
- Province: Erzincan
- District: Tercan
- Population (2021): 34
- Time zone: UTC+3 (TRT)

Mantarlı (Kurdish: Mantara) is a village in the Tercan District, Erzincan Province, Turkey. The village is populated by Kurds of the Lolan tribe and had a population of 34 in 2021.
