= Çayırlı =

Municipality in Erzincan Province, Turkey

- Municipality
- Location in Turkey
- Coordinates: 39°48′20″N 40°02′11″E
- Country: Turkey
- Province: Erzincan
- District: Çayırlı

Government
  - Mayor: Oktay Efe
- Elevation: 1,520 m (4,990 ft)
- Population (2021): 4,882
- Time zone: UTC+3 (TRT)
- Website: www.cayirli.bel.tr

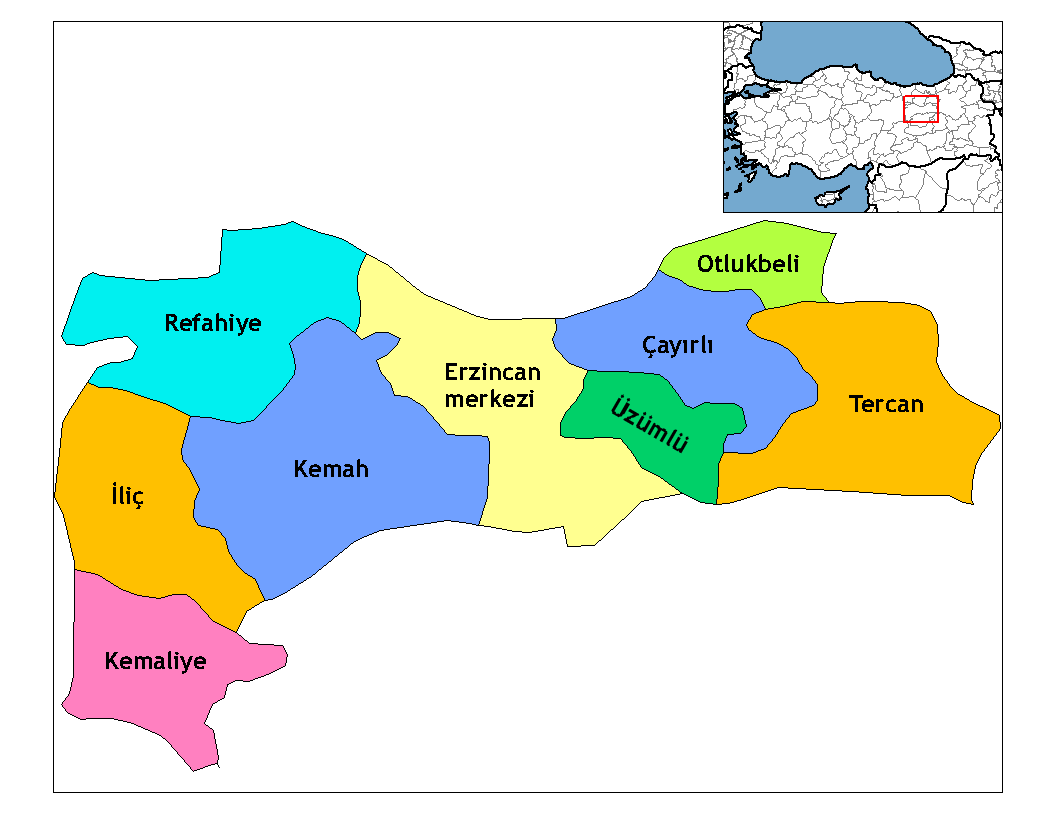
The districts of Erzincan province with Çayırlı district in blue towards the north east, in which Çayırlı municipality is located

Çayırlı (Kurdish: Mans, Mose) is a municipality (belde) and seat of Çayırlı District of Erzincan Province in the Eastern Anatolia region of Turkey. It had a population of 4,882 in 2021. It is divided into the neighborhoods of Atatürk, Barbaros and Fatih.

== History ==
In 1835, Mans village (now Çayırlı) was part of the Tercan district. The male population of Mans at that time was 262 Muslim and 74 non-Muslim, for a total of 336 males.

In 1936, Çayırlı was transferred to the Vilayet of Erzurum. In June 1954, Çayırlı was made a district (ilçe).
