= Kurukol, Tercan =

Village in Erzincan Province, Turkey

Kurukol
- Village
- Location within Turkey
- Coordinates: 39.724°N 40.325°E
- Country: Turkey
- Province: Erzincan
- District: Tercan
- Population (2021): 129
- Time zone: UTC+3 (TRT)

Kurukol is a village in the Tercan District, Erzincan Province, Turkey. The village had a population of 129 in 2021.
