= Aprank Monastery =

Armenian monastery in Erzincan Province, Turkey

Aprank monastery
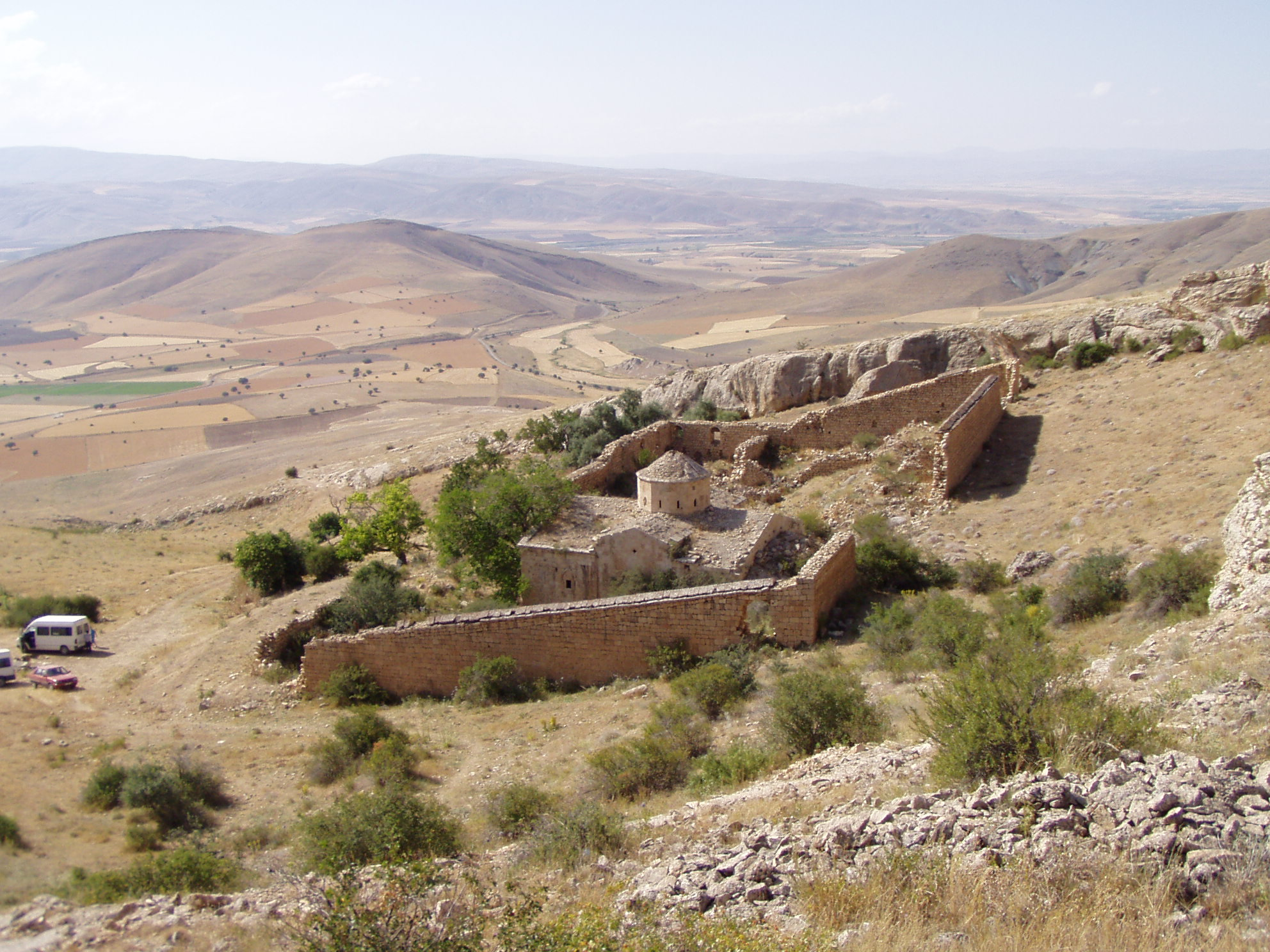
- The lower part of the monastery, the enclosure around the Church of St. John (Holy Precursor)

- Location within Turkey

Religion
- Affiliation: Armenian Apostolic Church

Location
- Location: Üçpınar, Tercan, Erzincan Province, Turkey
- Interactive map of Aprank monastery
- Coordinates: 39°39′41″N 40°17′20″E

Architecture
- Groundbreaking: 1171/72 (earliest khachkar); 1488 (earliest record of monastery); 1854 (St. John Church)

Aprank (Note: Armenian: Ապրանք վանք, Aprank‘ or Abrank‘ vank‘, also Ապրանից վանք, Apranits or Abranits vank‘) or Abrenk, (Note: Turkish: Abrenk Kilisesi or Abrenk Vank Kilisesi) also known as Saint David, is a former Armenian Apostolic monastery near Üçpınar, Tercan in Erzincan Province, eastern Turkey that was abandoned after the Armenian Genocide of 1915. Composed of a lower walled monastery and an upper chapel, the complex lies in a derelict and semi-ruined state.

The monastery is best known for a pair of monumental, nearly 5 meters tall khachkars (cross stones) from the late 12th century. They are regarded as the largest khachkars surviving within Turkey and the tallest in the world. Their replicas were erected near Echmiadzin Cathedral, the center of the Armenian Church, in 2015 in the memory of genocide victims.

The local municipality describes it as "architecturally noteworthy" and a landmark of Erzincan Province despite being largely unknown to tourists.

== Location ==
The monastery is situated at an altitude of around 1,700 m (5,600 ft), (Note: Another source states 2,360 m (7,740 ft).) on the western slope of Köbek-Dağ, 2 km south of the village of Üçpınar, formerly known as Abrank or Abrenk from the Armenian word aparank, meaning "estate", "mansion", or "palace". It is around 12 to 15 km (9.3 mi) southwest of Tercan (formerly Mamahatun), midway between Erzincan and Erzurum. Populated by Armenians before the genocide, Üçpınar is currently a Kurdish settlement.

== History and description ==
The monastery's early history is unknown. According to a traditional account, a martyrium was founded in the early 4th century by Gregory the Illuminator. At a later point, a monastery was founded and was known as St. Gregory by 1488, which is the earliest written record of its existence. It was also referred to as Tsakk‘ari (Ծակքարի), (Note: or Tsaghk‘ari (Ծաղկարի), also Dzagk‘ar or Dzağgeri) the name of another close-by village now known as Büklümdere (Kurdish: Zaxerî). It means "stone hole", in reference to its location, with a stone quarry open to the west.

The monastery was later called St. David (Surb Davit‘), after the seventh century saint Davit Dvinetsi (David of Dvin). (Note: According to a 1691 map by Eremia Chelebi) The name has often been used for the upper chapel, which likely contained his relics. The chapel was renovated by vardapet Malachia of Derjan (Maghak‘ia Derjantsi) between 1521 and 1535. By the late 17th century, it was the seat of the local archbishop, (Note: According to Malachia Ormanian (1910), the diocese of Terjan (Derjan) had 38 parishes, 33 churches, and 15,000 members.) a status it held to the 19th century. Extensive renovation works were carried out in the mid-19th century by the abbot Mgrditch Ardzrunian and monk-architect Ep‘rem. They also built a new church, dedicated to the Holy Precursor (Surb Karapet), i.e. John the Baptist, surrounding it with a new wall and other structures. Most of the surviving buildings date to this period. By the early 20th century, the monastery possessed lands and woods, and operated a school.

The monastery was a pilgrimage site for both Armenians and Kurds of Dersim, with both communities gathering for its feast day. An Armenian priest and Kurdish sayyid or pir would bless the sacrificial salt.

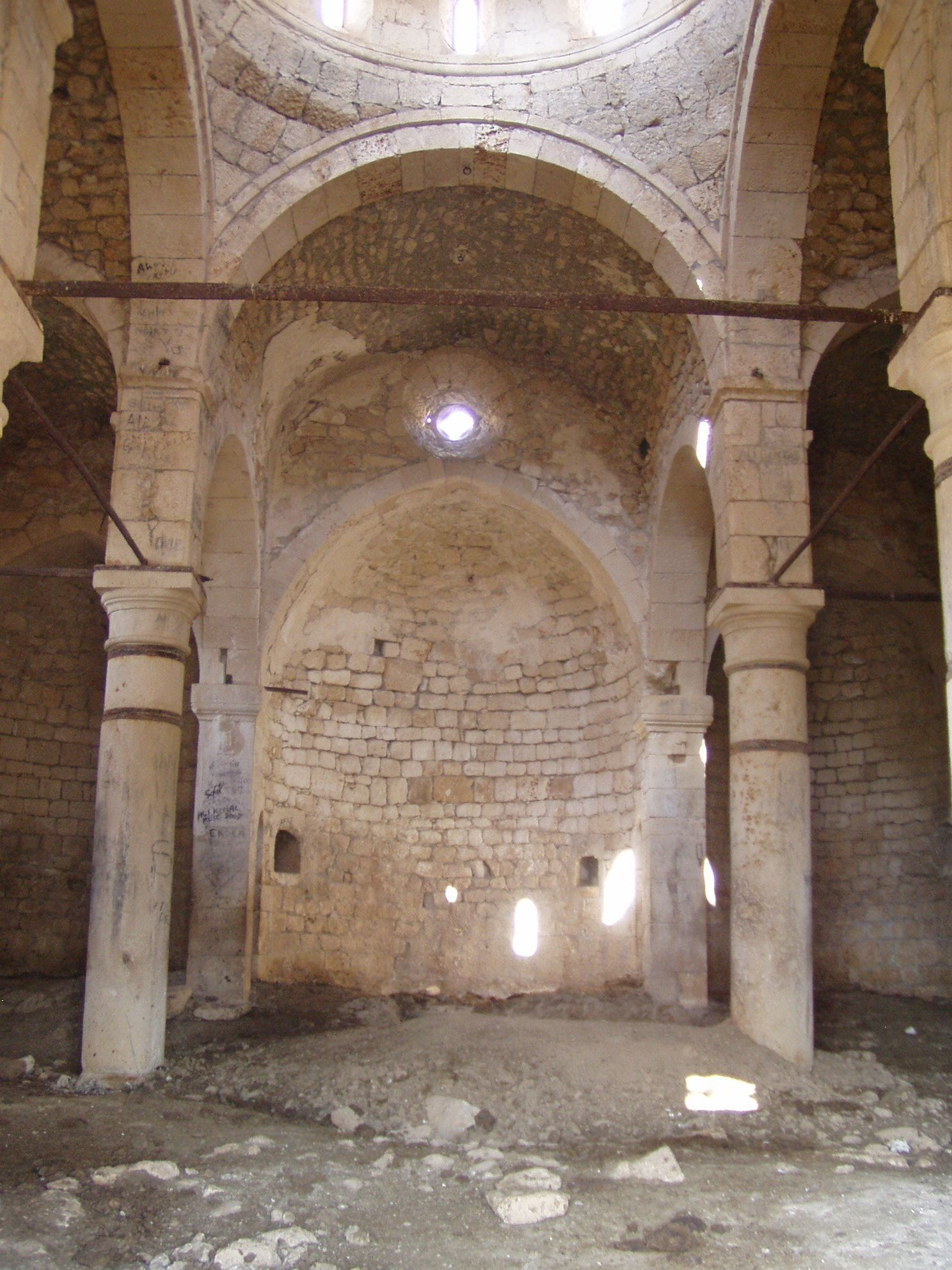
Interior view of the church

=== Lower monastery ===
Thick and tall walls surrounds the lower monastery, with dimensions of 67.8 m × 33.5 m (222 ft × 110 ft). The tall walls appear to have been constructed primarily for visual impact and to convey importance rather than for defensive purposes. This is evident from their lack of defensive features such as towers or parapets, and the fact that the enclosed area can be observed from elevated terrain nearby.

It contains the Church of the Holy Precursor (Surb Karapet), also called Church of Saint John (Surb Hovhannes), a cruciform building measuring 17 m × 12.2 m (56 ft × 40 ft) with four free-standing columns, a low drum, and topped with a flattened dome. Built between 1851 and 1873 on the site of an earlier church, it conforms to the plan of post-Byzantine Greek churches. The church's sole entrance is from the west. Its interior was originally covered in plaster, while the floor was paved with large stone slabs. A small barrel vaulted building (martyrium) is adjoined to the church's south wall, accessed solely from inside the church. Within the enclosure are the prelacy building and dwellings.

=== Upper chapel of St. David ===
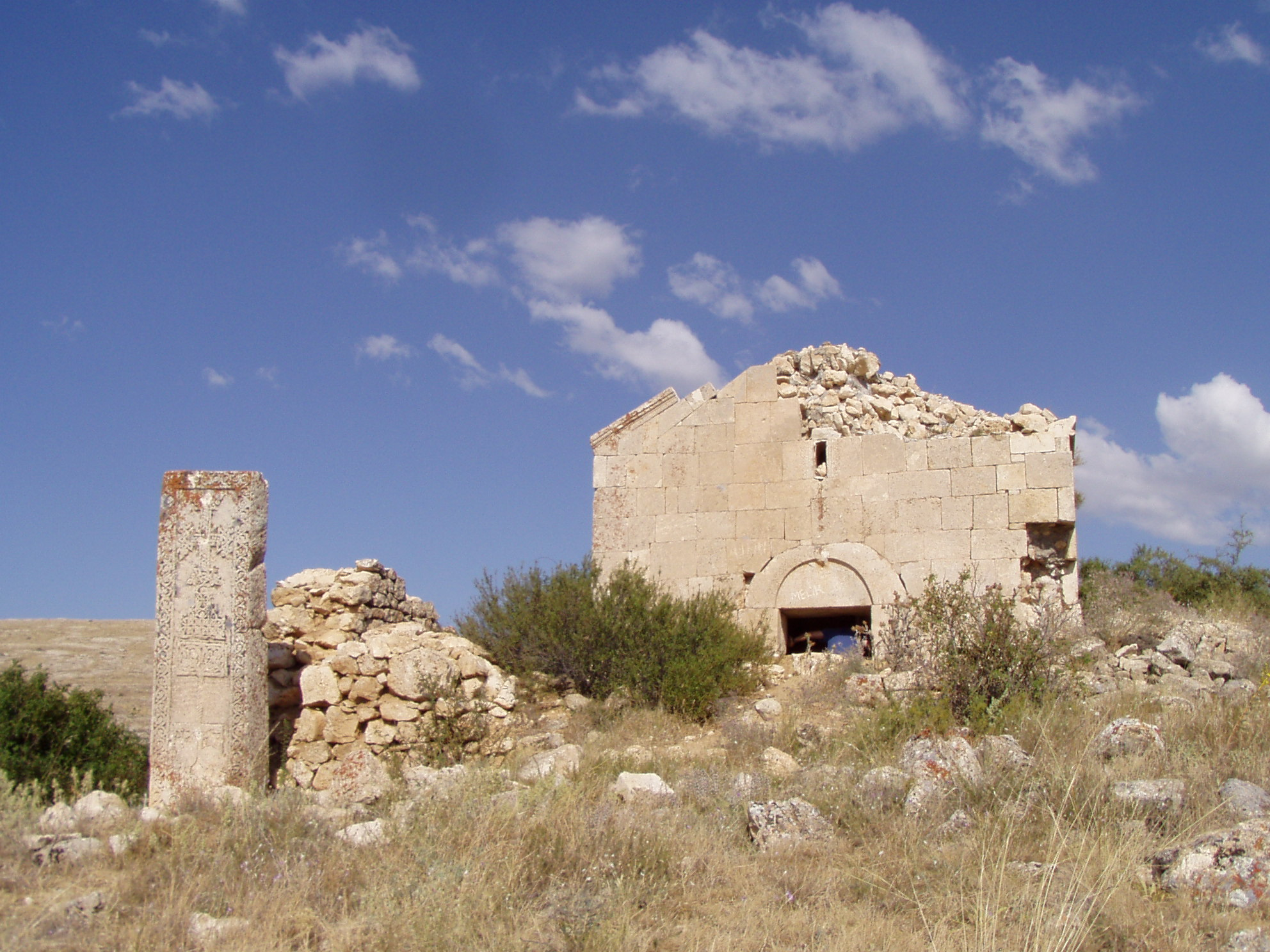
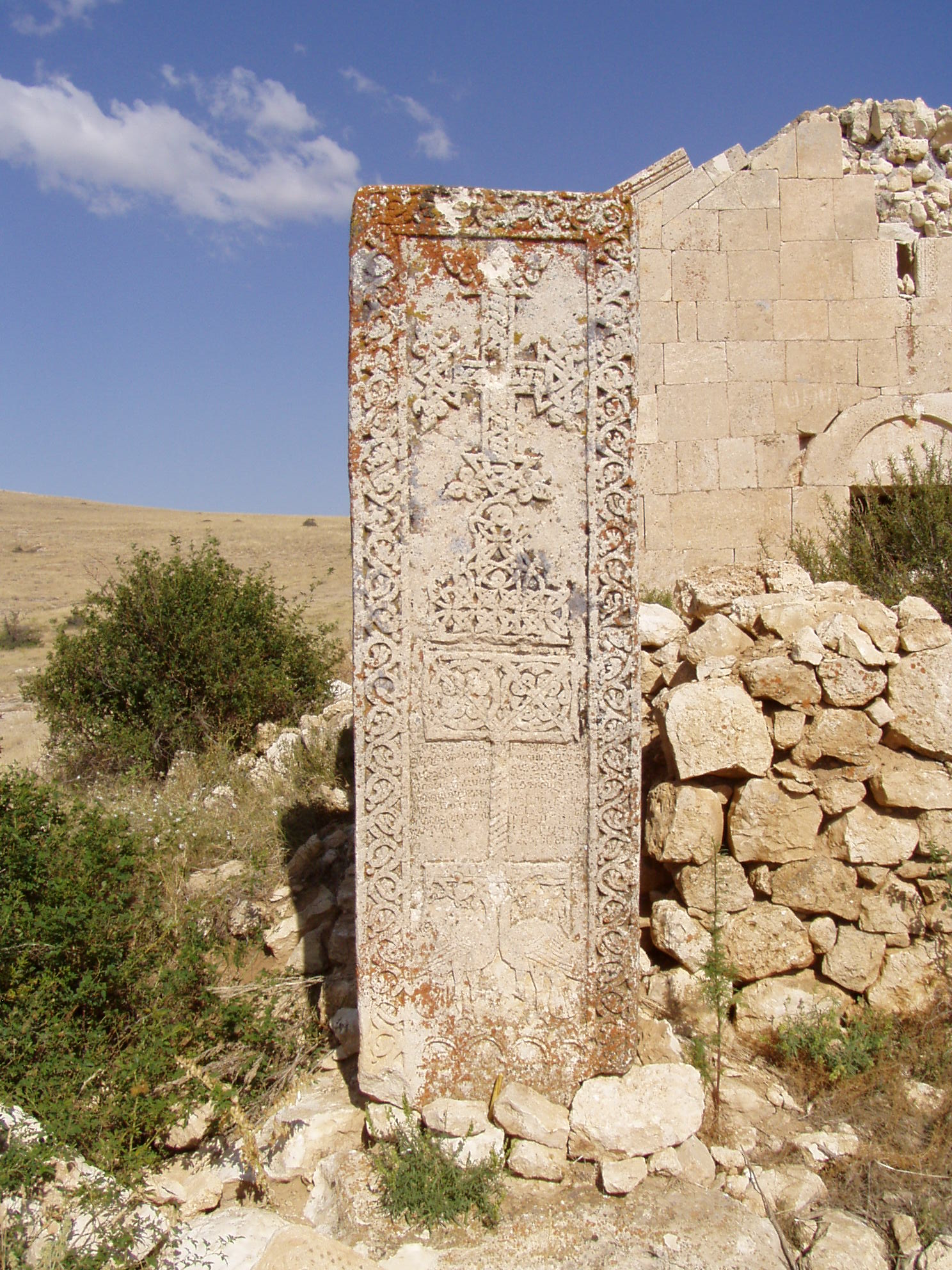
The chapel and the khachkar from 1171/72

The single nave chapel of St. David (Davit‘), identified as his tomb in an inscription at its entrance, is located on a hill 100 m (330 ft) from the enclosed monastery. It has a barrel vault and a saddle roof and reuses old masonry with "inscriptional fragments built into its walls."

An enclosed graveyard east of the chapel contains a large khachkar with a bird motif, while fragments of others are scattered around. The 2.4 m (7 ft 10 in) tall khachkar stands on the northwest corner of the forecourt with an inscription identifying it as a tombstone for a man named Grigor erected in the Armenian year 620, i.e. 1171/72. Its replica was erected in the Armenian capital Yerevan in 2017.

== Current state ==
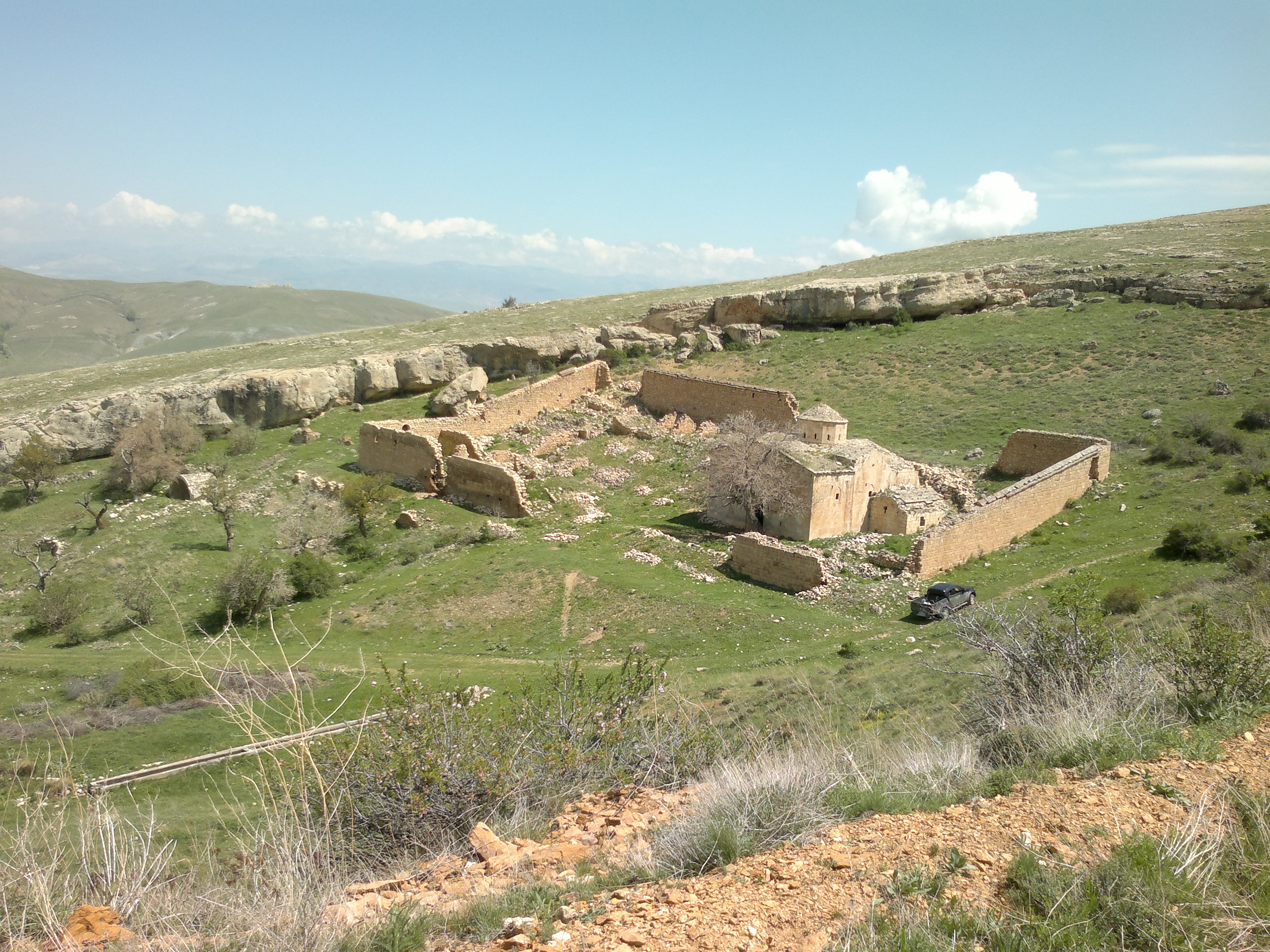
The lower monastery with crumbled walls

The monastery was abandoned during the Armenian Genocide of 1915, or shortly thereafter. Significant sections of the lower monastery enclosure's east, south and west walls and auxiliary structures have crumbled. The middle section of the western wall has been looted for its masonry.

When the Research on Armenian Architecture (RAA) team assessed the site in 1974, they found it in comparatively good condition. This preservation was reportedly attributed, at least partially, to the attentiveness of nearby residents. The documentation team noted that local community members approached them multiple times with cautionary warnings about not causing any harm to the structure.

The lower church of Holy Precursor (St. John) remains standing, though damaged, but its builder's tomb has vanished. Above the only entrance to St. John, the tympanum once featured a decorated stone panel with cross motifs and containing two inscriptions, one bearing the date 1854. The inscription was still visible in 1988, but had been destroyed by the early 1990s. The monastery was reportedly dynamited in 1990 under the pretext that it was being used as a shelter by Kurdish guerrillas. Hanriet Topuzyan Basoğlu wrote in Agos that the church's walls and floors "have been plundered by treasure hunters" with the entire surface having been dug up. According to Basoğlu, an eagle relief that once existed inside the church had disappeared by 2019.

The upper church of St. David has substantially deteriorated since the 1980s.

Turkish signage and government-approved visitor information do not mention its Armenian identity.

== Khachkars ==
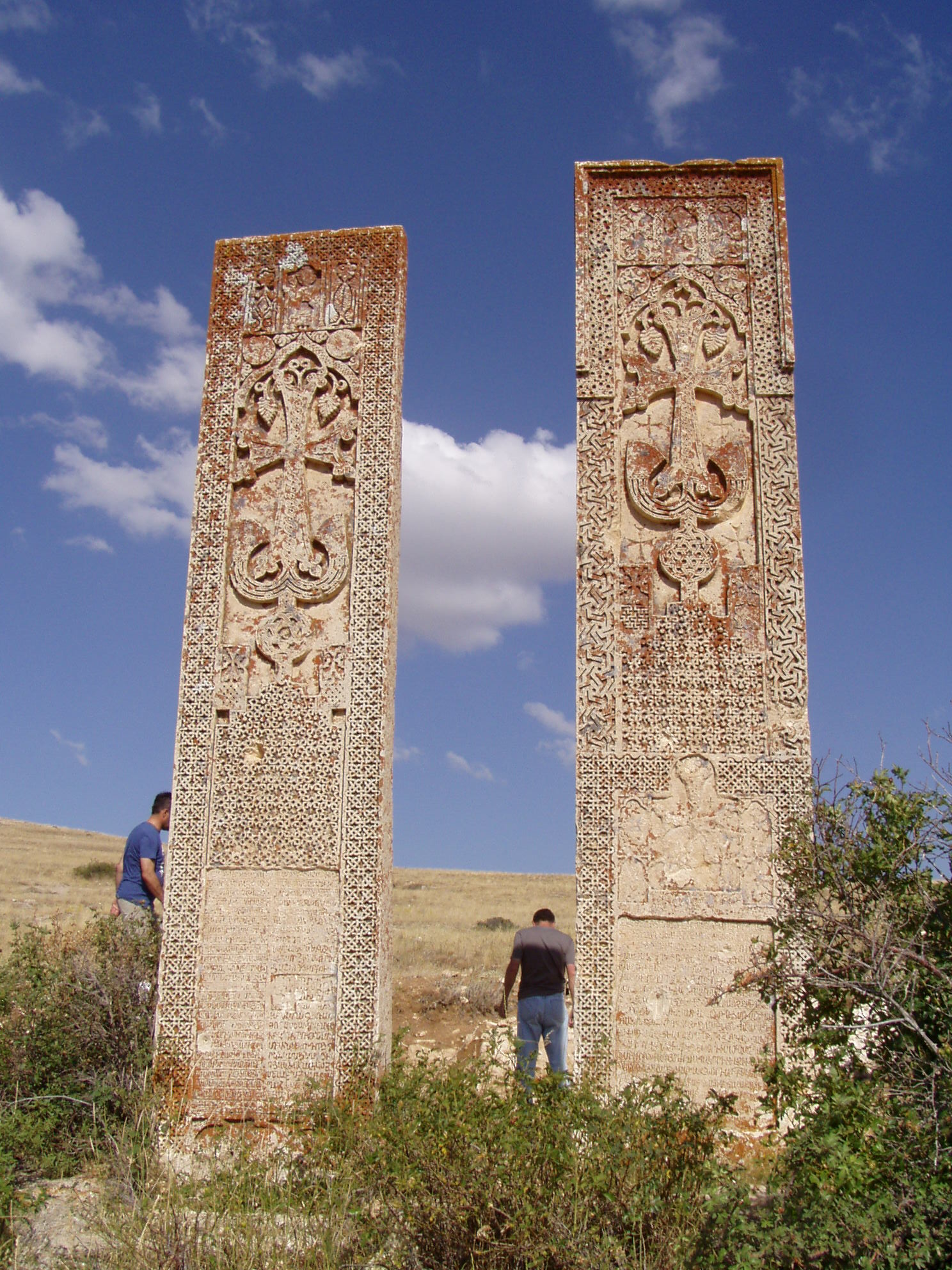
The pair of tall khachkars

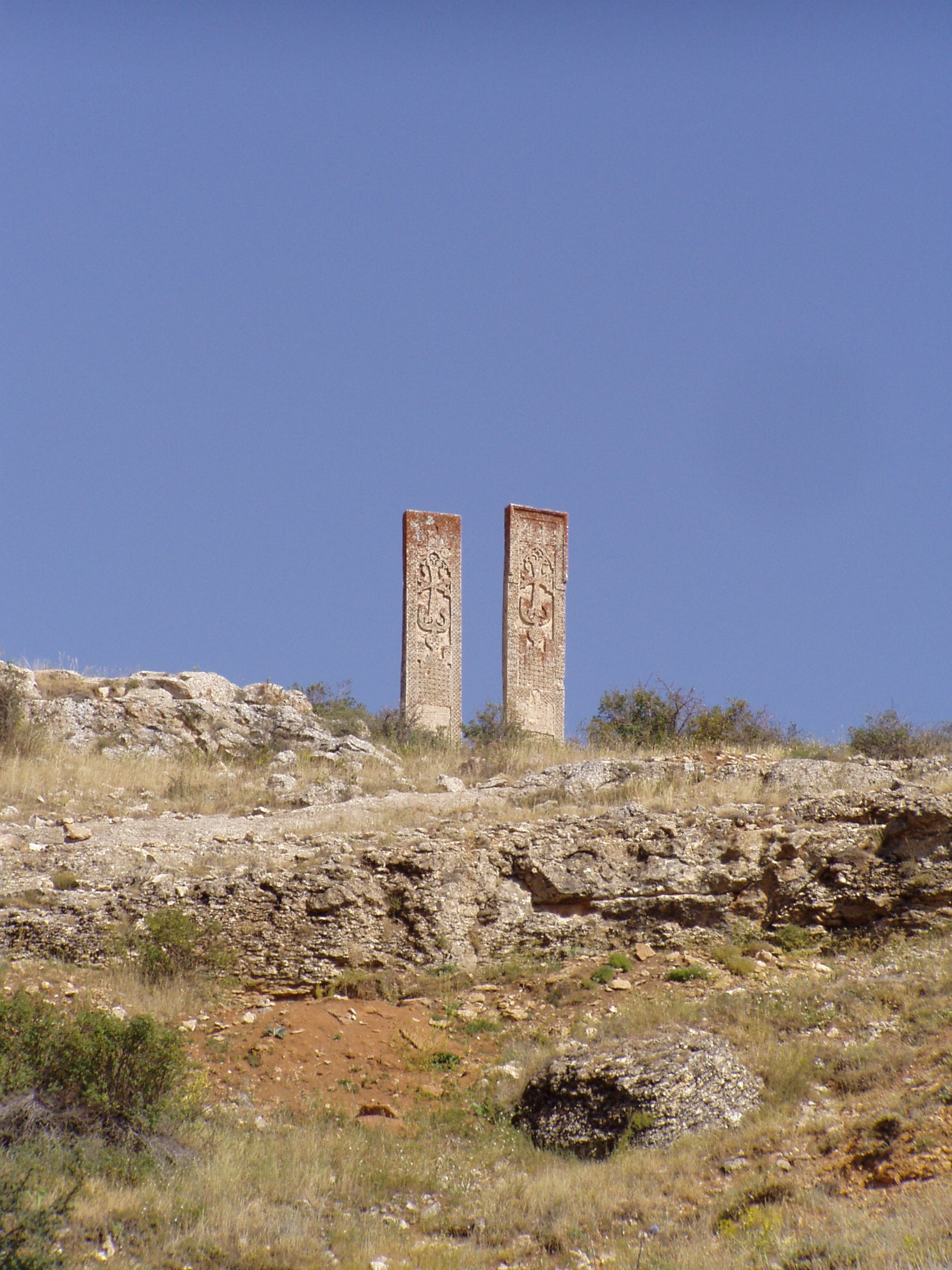
View from afar

Northeast of the upper chapel of St. David are a group of khachkars (cross stones). Three of these steles stand in their original foundations on a small elevation and remain largely undamaged but weathered. Two are exceptionally tall, standing approximately 4.7 m (15 ft) and 4.9 m (16 ft). (Note: Other sources give 5–6 meters, "over six metres", "approximately 5 meters", and 6–7 meters.) A third, smaller khachkar, at 2 m (6 ft 7 in), stood next to them until the 1970s, but is now toppled on the ground, while a fourth one may have previously stood in a hole cut into the rock surface, or may not have been erected at all.

The nearly 5-metre-tall (16 ft) stones have been described as "giant-sized", "exceptional", "extremely large" and "very remarkable". Researcher Steven Sim noted that due to their size and commanding location, the twin khachkars are visible from 8 kilometres (5.0 mi) away.

Hanriet Topuzyan Basoğlu described them as "one of the finest examples of Armenian stone art" and "said to be the largest khachkars in Anatolia." Similarly, Sevan Nişanyan called them "the most magnificent khachkars still standing in Turkey." Oya Pancaroğlu described the pair as "two of the most monumental khatchk’ars" preserved in modern Turkey and suggested their influence on the Muslim tombstones of Ahlat near Lake Van. Shahen Hovsepian described the pair of tall khachkars as unique specimens in the entire Armenian plateau. They are often cited as the tallest khachkars in the world. (Note: Also widely described as the tallest by Armenian tour agencies.)

The Turkish state-run cultural portal does not mention their Armenian identity, instead describing them simply as "standing stones". It dates the steles to the 17th century, with a supposed Ottoman Turkish inscription from 1684.

=== Dating and style ===
The two tall khachkars date from the late 12th century, specifically 1191 and 1194—based on inscriptions.

The middle khachkar (4.7 m) bears an inscription containing the Armenian year 643, i.e. 1194/95 and a chronology of Muslim sultans who are included in the prayers.

Bruchhaus wrote that the inscription of the right stele (4.9 m) is weathered with the date no longer legible. Script analysis points to the 12th–13th centuries. It also contains an Arabic inscription on its narrow right side containing the date 903, but it is unclear whether this refers to the Armenian or Islamic calendar (1454 or 1525).

The smallest stele (2 m) on the left, now toppled, contains a heavily weathered inscription on its narrow side with script analysis pointing to the 14th–15th centuries. An Armenian inscription on the back was left by father Eprem in 1877, who suggested that the "crosses" (khachkars) were built in 683 [i.e. 1234/35].

The two tall khachkars share a fundamental layout with the lower section consisting of an inscription area. Above it is a transitional section filled with intricate interwoven patterns arranged in a stepped pyramid formation. The uppermost section displays the cross depicted as the tree of life. Both contain disk motifs as symbols of the world below the large and richly ornamented crosses. A continuous braided pattern adorns each edge of the khachkars, creating a framing effect.

=== Etchmiadzin replicas ===
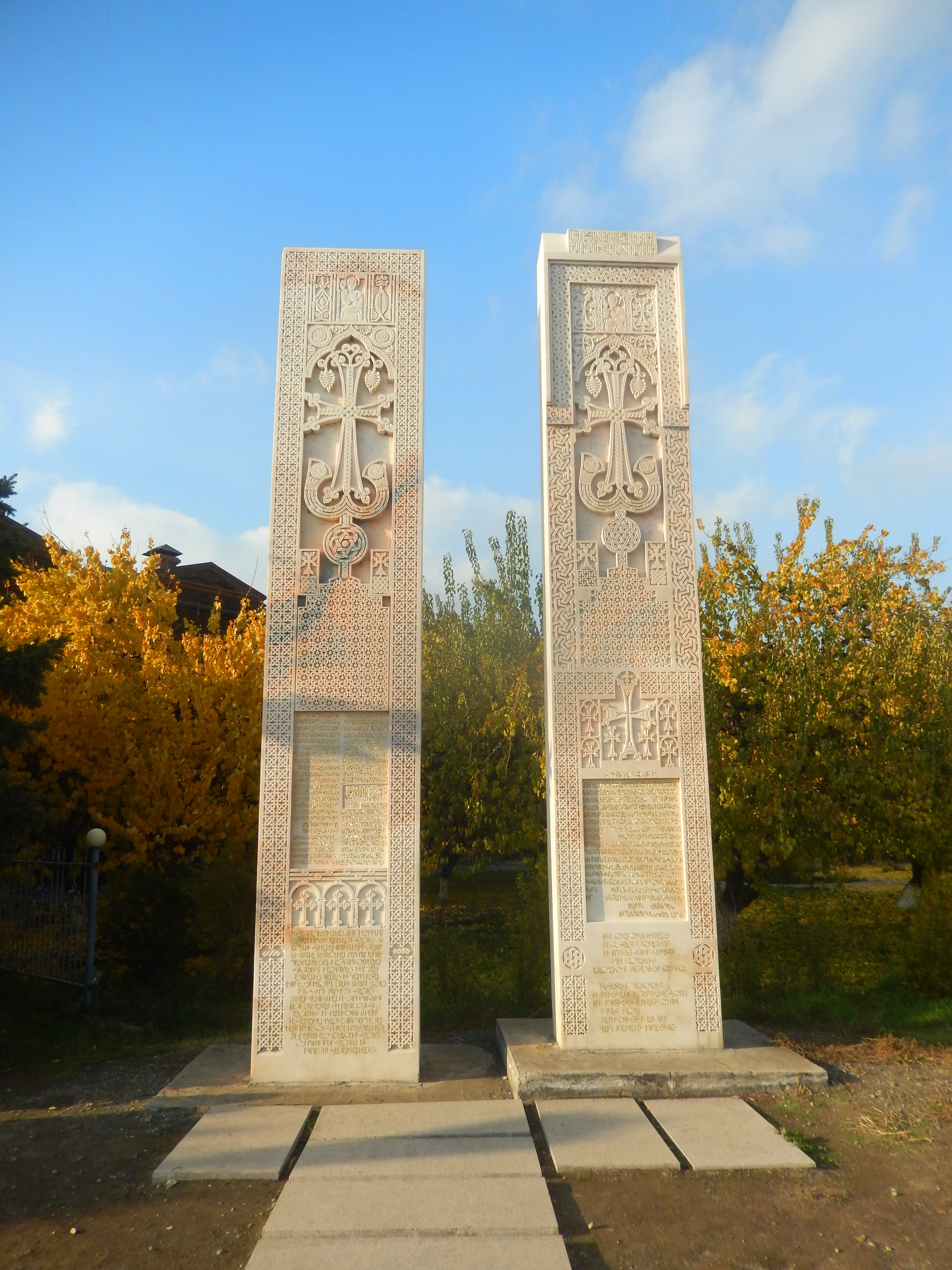
Replicas at Etchmiadzin

Replicas of the two tall khachkars were erected near Etchmiadzin Cathedral, the center of the Armenian Church in 2015. Carved by Lyudvig Ghazaryan, they stand 6 or 7 meters tall and weigh 12 or 14 tonnes. The replicas were ceremonially inaugurated on September 28, 2015, by Catholicos Karekin II in dedication to the victims of the Armenian genocide, whom the Armenian Church had canonized on the centennial of the genocide in April 2015. Ghazaryan described the khachkars as being unique in the world in terms of their size.
