= Gökçe, Tercan =

Village in Turkey

Gökçe
- Village
- Location in Turkey
- Coordinates: 39.775°N 40.239°E
- Country: Turkey
- Province: Erzincan
- District: Tercan
- Population (2022): 109
- Time zone: UTC+3 (TRT)

Gökçe is a village in the Tercan District of Erzincan Province in Turkey. Its population is 109 (2022).
