= Çamurdere, Çayırlı =

Village in Erzincan Province, Turkey

Çamurdere
- Village
- Location within Turkey
- Coordinates: 39.796°N 40.109°E
- Country: Turkey
- Province: Erzincan
- District: Çayırlı
- Population (2021): 60
- Time zone: UTC+3 (TRT)

Çamurdere (formerly Aşağıçamurdere) is a village in the Çayırlı District, Erzincan Province, Turkey. The village is populated by Kurds of the Kurêşan tribe and had a population of 60 in 2021.
