= Beşkaya, Tercan =

Village in Erzincan Province, Turkey

Beşkaya
- Village
- Location within Turkey
- Coordinates: 39.757°N 40.343°E
- Country: Turkey
- Province: Erzincan
- District: Tercan
- Population (2021): 123
- Time zone: UTC+3 (TRT)

Beşkaya is a village in the Tercan District, Erzincan Province, Turkey. The village had a population of 123 in 2021.
