= Ozanlı, Çayırlı =

Village in Erzincan Province, Turkey

Ozanlı
- Village
- Location within Turkey
- Coordinates: 39.825°N 39.935°E
- Country: Turkey
- Province: Erzincan
- District: Çayırlı
- Population (2021): 68
- Time zone: UTC+3 (TRT)

Ozanlı (Kurdish: Heyranî) is a village in the Çayırlı District, Erzincan Province, Turkey. The village is populated by Kurds of the Kurêşan tribe and had a population of 68 in 2021.

The hamlet of Babaşenliği is attached to the village.
