= Armutluk, Tercan =

Village in Erzincan Province, Turkey

Armutluk
- Village
- Location within Turkey
- Coordinates: 39°37′43″N 40°20′10″E
- Country: Turkey
- Province: Erzincan
- District: Tercan
- Population (2021): 28
- Time zone: UTC+3 (TRT)

Armutluk is a village in the Tercan District, Erzincan Province, Turkey. The village is populated by Kurds of different tribal affiliations and had a population of 28 in 2021.
