= Turnaçayırı, Çayırlı =

Village in Erzincan Province, Turkey

Turnaçayırı
- Village
- Location within Turkey
- Coordinates: 39.859°N 39.721°E
- Country: Turkey
- Province: Erzincan
- District: Çayırlı
- Population (2021): 13
- Time zone: UTC+3 (TRT)

Turnaçayırı (Kurdish: Koçmaşat) is a village in the Çayırlı District, Erzincan Province, Turkey. The village is populated by Kurds of the Kurêşan and Lolan tribes and had a population of 13 in 2021.
