= Yazıören, Tercan =

Village in Erzincan Province, Turkey

Yazıören
- Village
- Location within Turkey
- Coordinates: 39.907°N 40.359°E
- Country: Turkey
- Province: Erzincan
- District: Tercan
- Population (2021): 18
- Time zone: UTC+3 (TRT)

Yazıören is a village in the Tercan District, Erzincan Province, Turkey. The village had a population of 18 in 2021.

The hamlets of Azime, Kuşlu and Mollaveli are attached to the village.
