= Gökdere, Tercan =

Village in Erzincan Province, Turkey

Gökdere
- Village
- Location within Turkey
- Coordinates: 39.840°N 40.534°E
- Country: Turkey
- Province: Erzincan
- District: Tercan
- Population (2021): 12
- Time zone: UTC+3 (TRT)

Gökdere is a village in the Tercan District, Erzincan Province, Turkey. The village is populated by Kurds of the Şadiyan tribe and had a population of 12 in 2021.
