= Saraycık, Çayırlı =

Village in Erzincan Province, Turkey

Saraycık
- Village
- Location within Turkey
- Coordinates: 39.774°N 40.086°E
- Country: Turkey
- Province: Erzincan
- District: Çayırlı
- Population (2021): 50
- Time zone: UTC+3 (TRT)

Saraycık is a village in the Çayırlı District, Erzincan Province, Turkey. The village had a population of 50 in 2021.
