= Mazlumağa, Çayırlı =

Village in Erzincan Province, Turkey

Mazlumağa
- Village
- Location within Turkey
- Coordinates: 39.774°N 40.222°E
- Country: Turkey
- Province: Erzincan
- District: Çayırlı
- Population (2021): 20
- Time zone: UTC+3 (TRT)

Mazlumağa is a village in the Çayırlı District, Erzincan Province, Turkey. The village is populated by Kurds of the Şadiyan tribe and had a population of 20 in 2021.
