= Yaylım, Tercan =

Village in Erzincan Province, Turkey

Yaylım
- Village
- Location within Turkey
- Coordinates: 39.558°N 40.648°E
- Country: Turkey
- Province: Erzincan
- District: Tercan
- Population (2021): 174
- Time zone: UTC+3 (TRT)

Yaylım (Kurdish: Pardî) is a village in the Tercan District, Erzincan Province, Turkey. The village is populated by Kurds of the Çarekan tribe and had a population of 174 in 2021.

The hamlets of Aşağıpardı, Aşağıyaycım, Dere, Direkli, Gökçe, Göllüce, Güzyurdu, Kavak, Kot, Mezra, Oymataş, Saygılı and Taşburun are attached to the village.
