= Yalınkaş, Tercan =

Village in Erzincan Province, Turkey

Yalınkaş
- Village
- Location within Turkey
- Coordinates: 39.712°N 40.368°E
- Country: Turkey
- Province: Erzincan
- District: Tercan
- Population (2021): 132
- Time zone: UTC+3 (TRT)

Yalınkaş is a village in the Tercan District, Erzincan Province, Turkey. The village had a population of 132 in 2021.

The hamlet of Toptaş is attached to the village.
