= Gevenlik, Tercan =

Village in Erzincan Province, Turkey

Gevenlik
- Village
- Location within Turkey
- Coordinates: 39.782°N 40.319°E
- Country: Turkey
- Province: Erzincan
- District: Tercan
- Population (2021): 82
- Time zone: UTC+3 (TRT)

Gevenlik is a village in the Tercan District, Erzincan Province, Turkey. The village had a population of 82 in 2021.

The hamlet of Çiftlik is attached to the village.
