= Çilhoroz, Çayırlı =

Village in Erzincan Province, Turkey

Çilhoroz
- Village
- Location within Turkey
- Coordinates: 39.882°N 39.725°E
- Country: Turkey
- Province: Erzincan
- District: Çayırlı
- Population (2021): 22
- Time zone: UTC+3 (TRT)

Çilhoroz (Kurdish: Çilxoroz) is a village in the Çayırlı District, Erzincan Province, Turkey. The village is populated by Kurds of the Kurêşan and Lolan tribes and had a population of 22 in 2021. The hamlet of Deliktaş is attached to the village.
