= Balyayla, Tercan =

Village in Erzincan Province, Turkey

Balyayla
- Village
- Location within Turkey
- Coordinates: 39.610°N 40.147°E
- Country: Turkey
- Province: Erzincan
- District: Tercan
- Population (2021): 61
- Time zone: UTC+3 (TRT)

Balyayla is a village in the Tercan District, Erzincan Province, Turkey. The village is populated by Kurds of the Balaban tribe and had a population of 61 in 2021.

The hamlet of Balöz is attached to the village.

== History ==
In 1835, the village of Gâvurkaçağı (Ermeni Kaçağı, Kilise Kaçağı; now Balyayla) was part of the Tercan District. The male population of Gâvurkaçağı at that time was 0 Muslims and 81 non-Muslims.
