= Yukarıkartallı, Çayırlı =

Village in Erzincan Province, Turkey

Yukarıkartallı
- Village
- Location within Turkey
- Coordinates: 39.757°N 40.124°E
- Country: Turkey
- Province: Erzincan
- District: Çayırlı
- Population (2021): 87
- Time zone: UTC+3 (TRT)

Yukarıkartallı is a village in the Çayırlı District, Erzincan Province, Turkey. The village is populated by Kurds of the Arel tribe and had a population of 87 in 2021. The hamlet of Oğlaklı is attached to the village.
