= Gökpınar, Tercan =

Village in Erzincan Province, Turkey

Gökpınar
- Village
- Location within Turkey
- Coordinates: 39.651°N 40.568°E
- Country: Turkey
- Province: Erzincan
- District: Tercan
- Population (2021): 92
- Time zone: UTC+3 (TRT)

Gökpınar is a village in the Tercan District, Erzincan Province, Turkey. The village had a population of 92 in 2021.
