= Çayırdüzü, Tercan =

Village in Erzincan Province, Turkey

Çayırdüzü
- Village
- Location within Turkey
- Coordinates: 39.646°N 40.226°E
- Country: Turkey
- Province: Erzincan
- District: Tercan
- Population (2021): 9
- Time zone: UTC+3 (TRT)

Çayırdüzü is a village in the Tercan District, Erzincan Province, Turkey. The village had a population of 9 in 2021.

The hamlet of Hasanağa is attached to the village.
