= Altınkaya, Tercan =

Village in Erzincan Province, Turkey

Altınkaya
- Village
- Location within Turkey
- Coordinates: 39.917°N 40.232°E
- Country: Turkey
- Province: Erzincan
- District: Tercan
- Population (2021): 27
- Time zone: UTC+3 (TRT)

Altınkaya is a village in the Tercan District, Erzincan Province, Turkey. The village had a population of 27 in 2021.

The hamlets of Karaali, Karhane and Musaağa are attached to the village.
