= Ortaçat, Çayırlı =

Village in Erzincan Province, Turkey

Ortaçat
- Village
- Location within Turkey
- Coordinates: 39.901°N 40.112°E
- Country: Turkey
- Province: Erzincan
- District: Çayırlı
- Population (2021): 23
- Time zone: UTC+3 (TRT)

Ortaçat is a village in the Çayırlı District, Erzincan Province, Turkey. The village had a population of 23 in 2021.
