= Doğanyuva, Çayırlı =

Village in Erzincan Province, Turkey

Doğanyuva
- Village
- Location within Turkey
- Coordinates: 39.857°N 39.867°E
- Country: Turkey
- Province: Erzincan
- District: Çayırlı
- Population (2021): 52
- Time zone: UTC+3 (TRT)

Doğanyuva is a village in the Çayırlı District, Erzincan Province, Turkey. The village had a population of 52 in 2021.
