= Toprakkale, Çayırlı =

Village in Erzincan Province, Turkey

Toprakkale
- Village
- Location within Turkey
- Coordinates: 39.749°N 40.068°E
- Country: Turkey
- Province: Erzincan
- District: Çayırlı
- Population (2021): 14
- Time zone: UTC+3 (TRT)

Toprakkale is a village in the Çayırlı District, Erzincan Province, Turkey. The village is populated by the Turks and had a population of 14 in 2021.
