= İkizler, Tercan =

Village in Erzincan Province, Turkey

İkizler
- Village
- Location within Turkey
- Coordinates: 39.599°N 40.203°E
- Country: Turkey
- Province: Erzincan
- District: Tercan
- Population (2021): 17
- Time zone: UTC+3 (TRT)

İkizler is a village in the Tercan District, Erzincan Province, Turkey. The village had a population of 17 in 2021.

The hamlets of Bulutlu, Karlık and Recep are attached to the village.

== History ==
The southern slopes of two large rock masses near İkizler were settled in the Early Bronze Age.

In 1835, the village of Pun (or Pon) had a male population of 171 Muslims and 220 non-Muslims, for a total population of 391 males.
