= Yastıkköy, Tercan =

Village in Erzincan Province, Turkey

Yastıkköy
- Village
- Location within Turkey
- Coordinates: 39.603°N 40.288°E
- Country: Turkey
- Province: Erzincan
- District: Tercan
- Population (2021): 19
- Time zone: UTC+3 (TRT)

Yastıkköy (Kurdish: Yastixe) is a village in the Tercan District, Erzincan Province, Turkey. The village is populated by Kurds of the Çarekan tribe and had a population of 19 in 2021.

The hamlets of Kurubey and Yoğurtlu are attached to the village.

== History ==
Yastıkköy and Kurubey were depopulated and bulldozed in 1994.
