= Yamanlar, Tercan =

Yamanlar is a locality in the Tercan District, Erzincan Province, Turkey.

The locality was listed as Niğdere in the Ottoman cadastral defter of 1591-92, with a Muslim male population of 24 and a non-Muslim male population of 0. Its Muslim male population was 69 in an 1835 count, with a non-Muslim male population of 0. Its total population in the 1935 census was 114.

The locality was recorded as the village of Yamanlar ("former name Niğdere") in a 1968 government register. It was included as a settlement of the Tercan District in the 1990 census, but had been removed from government listings by 2015. Nevertheless, Yamanlar had a muhtar in 2020 and received an official visit from the kaymakam of Tercan in 2021.

To the west of Yamanlar there is reported to be the tomb of an anonymous ermiş (saint) which is visited by those seeking relief from mental illness, epilepsy, and malaria. According to local legend, a man was collecting stones in the area, when a head appeared. He took the head and placed it in water. Later, in a dream the head told him, "Take me out of here or I will harm you." Then a grave was raised for the head, which became a pilgrimage site. In 1972, the grave was enclosed with stone and made into a tomb.
