= Mirzaoğlu, Çayırlı =

Village in Erzincan Province, Turkey

Mirzaoğlu
- Village
- Location within Turkey
- Coordinates: 39.927°N 40.115°E
- Country: Turkey
- Province: Erzincan
- District: Çayırlı
- Population (2021): 58
- Time zone: UTC+3 (TRT)

Mirzaoğlu is a village in the Çayırlı District, Erzincan Province, Turkey. The village had a population of 58 in 2021.

The hamlet of Hacıbektaş is attached to the village.
