= Beğendik, Tercan =

Village in Erzincan Province, Turkey

Beğendik
- Village
- Location within Turkey
- Coordinates: 39.823°N 40.337°E
- Country: Turkey
- Province: Erzincan
- District: Tercan
- Population (2021): 100
- Time zone: UTC+3 (TRT)

Beğendik (Kurdish: Vartik) is a village in the Tercan District, Erzincan Province, Turkey.

The hamlets of Atlıca, Hüseyinefendi and Tuzla are attached to the village.

== Demographics ==
The village is populated by Kurds of the Şikakî tribe and had a population of 100 in 2021.
