= Gedikdere, Tercan =

Village in Erzincan Province, Turkey

Gedikdere
- Village
- Location within Turkey
- Coordinates: 39.643°N 40.420°E
- Country: Turkey
- Province: Erzincan
- District: Tercan
- Population (2021): 82
- Time zone: UTC+3 (TRT)

Gedikdere (Kurdish: Pirnaşel) is a village in the Tercan District, Erzincan Province, Turkey. The village is populated by Kurds of the Aşûran, Çarekan and Lolan tribes and had a population of 82 in 2021.

The hamlets of Alataş, Aslançayırı, Derviş, Kale, Yukarıgedikdere, Yusufbey and Yüceler are attached to the village.
