= Üçpınar, Tercan =

Village in Erzincan Province, Turkey

Üçpınar
- Village
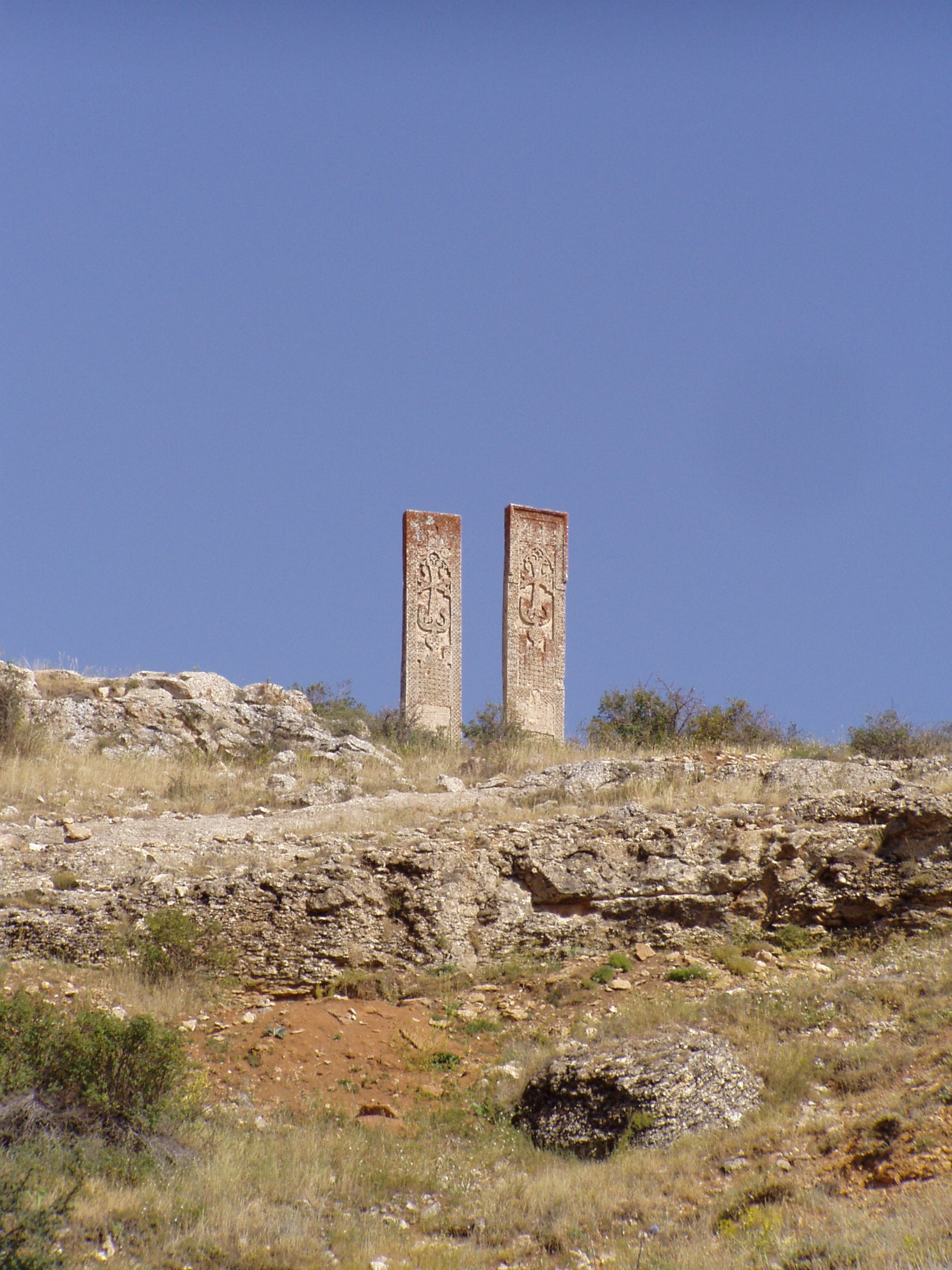
- Twin Khachkars located in the village

- Location within Turkey
- Coordinates: 39.673°N 40.289°E
- Country: Turkey
- Province: Erzincan
- District: Tercan
- Population (2021): 13
- Time zone: UTC+3 (TRT)

Üçpınar (Armenian: Ապրանք, romanized: Abrank; Kurdish: Avreng) is a village in the Tercan District, Erzincan Province, Turkey. The village is populated by Kurds of the Şadiyan tribe and had a population of 13 in 2021.

It is home to the Armenian Aprank Monastery, best known for the pair of two monumental khachkars.

== History ==
In 1835, the male population of the village of Abrenk (Abrank; now Üçpınar) was 35 Muslims and 53 non-Muslims, for a total of 88 males.
