= Esendoruk, Çayırlı =

Village in Erzincan Province, Turkey

Esendoruk
- Village
- Location within Turkey
- Coordinates: 39.860°N 39.770°E
- Country: Turkey
- Province: Erzincan
- District: Çayırlı
- Population (2021): 19
- Time zone: UTC+3 (TRT)

Esendoruk (Kurdish: Peyler) is a village in the Çayırlı District, Erzincan Province, Turkey. The village is populated by Kurds of the Kurêşan tribe and had a population of 19 in 2021.

The hamlet of Kütüklü is attached to the village.
