= Hastarla, Çayırlı =

Village in Erzincan Province, Turkey

Hastarla
- Village
- Location within Turkey
- Coordinates: 39.831°N 39.894°E
- Country: Turkey
- Province: Erzincan
- District: Çayırlı
- Population (2021): 69
- Time zone: UTC+3 (TRT)

Hastarla (Kurdish: Veringah) is a village in the Çayırlı District, Erzincan Province, Turkey. The village is populated by Kurds and had a population of 69 in 2021. The hamlet of Kavaklı is attached to the village.
