= Bölükova, Çayırlı =

Village in Erzincan Province, Turkey

Bölükova
- Village
- Location within Turkey
- Coordinates: 39.906°N 40.047°E
- Country: Turkey
- Province: Erzincan
- District: Çayırlı
- Population (2021): 37
- Time zone: UTC+3 (TRT)

Bölükova is a village in the Çayırlı District, Erzincan Province, Turkey. The village had a population of 37 in 2021.
