= Karacakışlak, Tercan =

Village in Erzincan Province, Turkey

Karacakışlak
- Village
- Location within Turkey
- Coordinates: 39°52′43″N 40°25′50″E
- Country: Turkey
- Province: Erzincan
- District: Tercan
- Population (2021): 28
- Time zone: UTC+3 (TRT)

Karacakışlak is a village in the Tercan District, Erzincan Province, Turkey. The village had a population of 28 in 2021.

The hamlets of Arifbey and Kavaklı are attached to the village.
