= Ortaköy, Tercan =

Village in Erzincan Province, Turkey

Ortaköy
- Village
- Location within Turkey
- Coordinates: 39.715°N 40.113°E
- Country: Turkey
- Province: Erzincan
- District: Tercan
- Population (2021): 59
- Time zone: UTC+3 (TRT)

Ortaköy (Tivnik) is a village in the Tercan District, Erzincan Province, Turkey. The village had a population of 59 in 2021.

== History ==
In 1835, the village of Tivnik (Ortaköy) was part of the Tercan District. The male population of Tivnik at that time was 0 Muslims and 82 non-Muslims.
