= Yaylayolu, Tercan =

Village in Erzincan Province, Turkey

Yaylayolu
- Village
- Location within Turkey
- Coordinates: 39.696°N 40.403°E
- Country: Turkey
- Province: Erzincan
- District: Tercan
- Population (2021): 94
- Time zone: UTC+3 (TRT)

Yaylayolu is a village in the Tercan District, Erzincan Province, Turkey. The village is populated by Kurds of the Haydaran tribe and had a population of 94 in 2021.

The hamlet of Değirmen is attached to the village.
