= Sağlıca, Tercan =

Village in Erzincan Province, Turkey

Sağlıca
- Village
- Location within Turkey
- Coordinates: 39.624°N 40.463°E
- Country: Turkey
- Province: Erzincan
- District: Tercan
- Population (2021): 31
- Time zone: UTC+3 (TRT)

Sağlıca is a village in the Tercan District, Erzincan Province, Turkey. The village is populated by Kurds of the Çarekan and Haydaran tribes and had a population of 31 in 2021.

The hamlet of Telli is attached to the village.
