= Şengül, Tercan =

Village in Erzincan Province, Turkey

Şengül
- Village
- Location within Turkey
- Coordinates: 39.632°N 40.093°E
- Country: Turkey
- Province: Erzincan
- District: Tercan
- Population (2021): 32
- Time zone: UTC+3 (TRT)

Şengül is a village in the Tercan District, Erzincan Province, Turkey. The village is populated by Kurds of the Balaban and Dewrêş Cemal tribes and had a population of 32 in 2021.

The hamlet of Alibey is attached to the village.
