= Sarıgüney, Çayırlı =

Village in Erzincan Province, Turkey

Sarıgüney
- Village
- Location within Turkey
- Coordinates: 39.898°N 39.831°E
- Country: Turkey
- Province: Erzincan
- District: Çayırlı
- Population (2021): 67
- Time zone: UTC+3 (TRT)

Sarıgüney is a village in the Çayırlı District, Erzincan Province, Turkey. The village had a population of 67 in 2021.

The hamlet of Patuklugelengeçi is attached to the village.
