= Çukuryurt, Tercan =

Village in Erzincan Province, Turkey

Çukuryurt
- Village
- Location within Turkey
- Coordinates: 39.641°N 40.298°E
- Country: Turkey
- Province: Erzincan
- District: Tercan
- Population (2021): 23
- Time zone: UTC+3 (TRT)

Çukuryurt is a village in the Tercan District, Erzincan Province, Turkey. The village had a population of 23 in 2021.
