= Harmantepe, Çayırlı =

Village in Erzincan Province, Turkey

Harmantepe
- Village
- Location within Turkey
- Coordinates: 39.828°N 40.083°E
- Country: Turkey
- Province: Erzincan
- District: Çayırlı
- Population (2021): 216
- Time zone: UTC+3 (TRT)

Harmantepe is a village in the Çayırlı District, Erzincan Province, Turkey. The village had a population of 216 in 2021.
