= Çilligöl, Çayırlı =

Village in Erzincan Province, Turkey

Çilligöl
- Village
- Location within Turkey
- Coordinates: 39.803°N 39.985°E
- Country: Turkey
- Province: Erzincan
- District: Çayırlı
- Population (2021): 71
- Time zone: UTC+3 (TRT)

Çilligöl (Kurdish: Ekrek Goller) is a village in the Çayırlı District, Erzincan Province, Turkey. The village is populated by Kurds of the Alan and Lolan tribes and had a population of 71 in 2021.

The hamlet of Arıtaş is attached to the village.
