= Yürekli, Çayırlı =

Village in Erzincan Province, Turkey

Yürekli
- Village
- Location within Turkey
- Coordinates: 39.880°N 40.104°E
- Country: Turkey
- Province: Erzincan
- District: Çayırlı
- Population (2021): 22
- Time zone: UTC+3 (TRT)

Yürekli is a village in the Çayırlı District, Erzincan Province, Turkey. The village had a population of 22 in 2021.
