= Beykonak, Tercan =

Village in Erzincan Province, Turkey

Beykonak
- Village
- Location within Turkey
- Coordinates: 39.875°N 40.403°E
- Country: Turkey
- Province: Erzincan
- District: Tercan
- Population (2021): 56
- Time zone: UTC+3 (TRT)

Beykonak is a village in the Tercan District, Erzincan Province, Turkey. The village had a population of 56 in 2021.

The hamlet of Çatak is attached to the village.
