= Sırataş, Çayırlı =

Village in Erzincan Province, Turkey

Sırataş
- Village
- Location within Turkey
- Coordinates: 39.851°N 40.080°E
- Country: Turkey
- Province: Erzincan
- District: Çayırlı
- Population (2021): 72
- Time zone: UTC+3 (TRT)

Sırataş is a village in the Çayırlı District, Erzincan Province, Turkey. The village is populated by Kurds of the Alan tribe and had a population of 72 in 2021.
