= Yaylalar, Çayırlı =

Village in Erzincan Province, Turkey

Yaylalar
- Village
- Location within Turkey
- Coordinates: 39.852°N 39.806°E
- Country: Turkey
- Province: Erzincan
- District: Çayırlı
- Population (2021): 43
- Time zone: UTC+3 (TRT)

Yaylalar is a village in the Çayırlı District, Erzincan Province, Turkey. The village is populated by Kurds of the Kurêşan tribe and had a population of 43 in 2021. The hamlet of Aşağıyaylalar is attached to the village.
