= Doluca, Tercan =

Village in Erzincan Province, Turkey

Doluca
- Village
- Location within Turkey
- Coordinates: 39.846°N 40.437°E
- Country: Turkey
- Province: Erzincan
- District: Tercan
- Population (2021): 27
- Time zone: UTC+3 (TRT)

Doluca is a village in the Tercan District, Erzincan Province, Turkey. The village had a population of 27 in 2021.

The hamlets of Atçayırı and Ortamahalle are attached to the village.
