= Çayönü, Çayırlı =

Village in Erzincan Province, Turkey

Çayönü
- Village
- Location within Turkey
- Coordinates: 39.772°N 40.012°E
- Country: Turkey
- Province: Erzincan
- District: Çayırlı
- Population (2021): 85
- Time zone: UTC+3 (TRT)

Çayönü is a village in the Çayırlı District, Erzincan Province, Turkey. The village is populated by Kurds and had a population of 85 in 2021.

The hamlets of Emirkomu, Kahmut and Karamelik are attached to the village.
