= Büklümdere, Tercan =

Village in Erzincan Province, Turkey

Büklümdere
- Village
- Location within Turkey
- Coordinates: 39.638°N 40.192°E
- Country: Turkey
- Province: Erzincan
- District: Tercan
- Population (2021): 127
- Time zone: UTC+3 (TRT)

Büklümdere (Kurdish: Zaxerî) is a village in the Tercan District, Erzincan Province, Turkey. The village is populated by Kurds, Laz and Turks and had a population of 127 in 2021.

== History ==
During the Ottoman-Russian War of 1828-1829, Russia invaded Eastern Anatolia, and after the war, the Russians took possibly 100,000 Armenians back with them to Russian territory, including 47 households from the Tercan area, especially from Pekeriç (Çadırkaya), Piriz (Çaykent), and Zağgeri (Zağger, Büklümdere).

In 1835, the male population of the village of Zağger-i ülya (Upper Zağger) included 32 Muslims and 0 non-Muslims, while the male population of the village of Zağger-i süflâ (Lower Zağger) included 3 Muslims and 94 non-Muslims—for both villages a total male population of 129.
