= Akyurt, Tercan =

Village in Erzincan Province, Turkey

Akyurt
- Village
- Location within Turkey
- Coordinates: 39.732°N 40.249°E
- Country: Turkey
- Province: Erzincan
- District: Tercan
- Population (2021): 80
- Time zone: UTC+3 (TRT)

Akyurt (Kurdish: Astokom) is a village in the Tercan District, Erzincan Province, Turkey. The village is populated by Kurds and had a population of 80 in 2021.

The hamlet of Koyunlu is attached to the village.
