= Yaylakent, Çayırlı =

Village in Erzincan Province, Turkey

Yaylakent
- Village
- Location within Turkey
- Coordinates: 39.871°N 39.847°E
- Country: Turkey
- Province: Erzincan
- District: Çayırlı
- Population (2021): 111
- Time zone: UTC+3 (TRT)

Yaylakent (Kurdish: Gulebax) is a village in the Çayırlı District, Erzincan Province, Turkey. The village is populated by Kurds of the Alan tribe and had a population of 111 in 2021.

The hamlet of Örenşehir is attached to the village.

== Covid pandemic ==
The village of Yaylakent in the Çayırlı district of Erzincan was quarantined as part of the measures to combat the corona virus.

In the information received from the Çayırlı District Governorship, "According to the decision of the Erzincan Provincial Public Health Council, the Yaylakent village of our district has been quarantined for 14 days as of April 15, 2020, within the scope of the measures to combat the corona virus, and entry and exit to our village has been prohibited." it was said. On the other hand, on March 30, the practice in Eskibağlar and Gediktepe villages, which were quarantined within the scope of new type of corona virus measures, in the Kemah district of Erzincan was lifted.
