= Paşayurdu, Çayırlı =

Village in Erzincan Province, Turkey

Paşayurdu
- Village
- Location within Turkey
- Coordinates: 39.787°N 39.928°E
- Country: Turkey
- Province: Erzincan
- District: Çayırlı
- Population (2021): 32
- Time zone: UTC+3 (TRT)

Paşayurdu (Kurdish: Harşen) is a village in the Çayırlı District, Erzincan Province, Turkey. The village is populated by Kurds of the Kurêşan and Lolan tribes and had a population of 32 in 2021. The hamlet of Aşağıyaylalar is attached to the village.
