= Kalopsida =

Kalopsida: Καλοψίδα (Greek); Çayönü (Turkish)
- Location within Cyprus
- Coordinates: 35°05′39″N 33°47′39″E
- Country (de jure): Cyprus
  - District: Famagusta District
- Country (de facto): Northern Cyprus
  - District: Gazimağusa District

Population (2011)
  - Total: 660

Kalopsida (Greek: Καλοψίδα; Turkish: Çayönü) is a village in the Famagusta District of Cyprus, 8 kilometres (5.0 mi) east of Lysi. It is under the de facto control of Northern Cyprus.

Before 1974, Kalopsida was an exclusively Greek Cypriot village; its residents were displaced during the Turkish invasion of Cyprus. In 1973, 1,023 Greek Cypriots lived in Kalopsida. Presently, it is inhabited by displaced Turkish Cypriots from the south and some families from Turkey. It was renamed Çayönü in Turkish in 1975; Çayönü is the Turkish name of Paramali, which is where many of the Turkish Cypriots who now live in Kalopsida originate from.

Kalopsidiotes (pronounced Greek pronunciation: [kalopsiˈθcotes]; residents of Kalopsida) were known for being very brave and constantly carrying knives, which they regarded as a symbol of pride.

The village has a football club (Çayönü) in Northern Cyprus K-Pet 2nd League.
