= Pınarlı, Çayırlı =

Village in Erzincan Province, Turkey

Pınarlı
- Village
- Location within Turkey
- Coordinates: 39.749°N 40.081°E
- Country: Turkey
- Province: Erzincan
- District: Çayırlı
- Population (2021): 20
- Time zone: UTC+3 (TRT)

Pınarlı (Kurdish: Tohlistan) is a village in the Çayırlı District, Erzincan Province, Turkey. The village is populated by Kurds of the Lolan and Şadiyan tribes and had a population of 20 in 2021.

The hamlet of Soğucak is attached to the village.
