= Saygılı, Çayırlı =

Village in Erzincan Province, Turkey

Saygılı
- Village
- Location within Turkey
- Coordinates: 39.800°N 40.100°E
- Country: Turkey
- Province: Erzincan
- District: Çayırlı
- Population (2021): 59
- Time zone: UTC+3 (TRT)

Saygılı is a village in the Çayırlı District, Erzincan Province, Turkey. The village had a population of 59 in 2021.
