= Çataksu, Çayırlı =

Village in Erzincan Province, Turkey

Çataksu
- Village
- Location within Turkey
- Coordinates: 39.985°N 40.201°E
- Country: Turkey
- Province: Erzincan
- District: Çayırlı
- Population (2021): 150
- Time zone: UTC+3 (TRT)

Çataksu is a village in the Çayırlı District, Erzincan Province, Turkey. The village had a population of 150 in 2021. The hamlets of Çatak and Yapraklı are attached to the village.
