= Balıklı, Çayırlı =

Village in Erzincan Province, Turkey

Balıklı
- Village
- Location within Turkey
- Coordinates: 39.840°N 40.006°E
- Country: Turkey
- Province: Erzincan
- District: Çayırlı
- Population (2021): 166
- Time zone: UTC+3 (TRT)

Balıklı is a village in the Çayırlı District, Erzincan Province, Turkey. The village is populated by Bosnians, Kurds and Turks and had a population of 166 in 2021.
