= Tosunlar, Çayırlı =

Village in Erzincan Province, Turkey

Tosunlar
- Village
- Location within Turkey
- Coordinates: 39.714°N 40.049°E
- Country: Turkey
- Province: Erzincan
- District: Çayırlı
- Population (2021): 9
- Time zone: UTC+3 (TRT)

Tosunlar (Kurdish: Sevkar) is a village in the Çayırlı District, Erzincan Province, Turkey. The village is populated by Kurds of the Şadiyan and Lolan tribes and had a population of 9 in 2021.

The hamlet of Çilingir is attached to the village.
