= Vican =

Vican, Vićan and Vičan are surnames. Notable people with these surnames include:

- Ante Vican (1926–2014), Croatian actor
- Frano Vićan (born 1976), Croatian water polo player
- Michal Vičan (1925–1986), Slovak footballer
