= Tercan District =

District of Erzincan Province, Turkey

- District
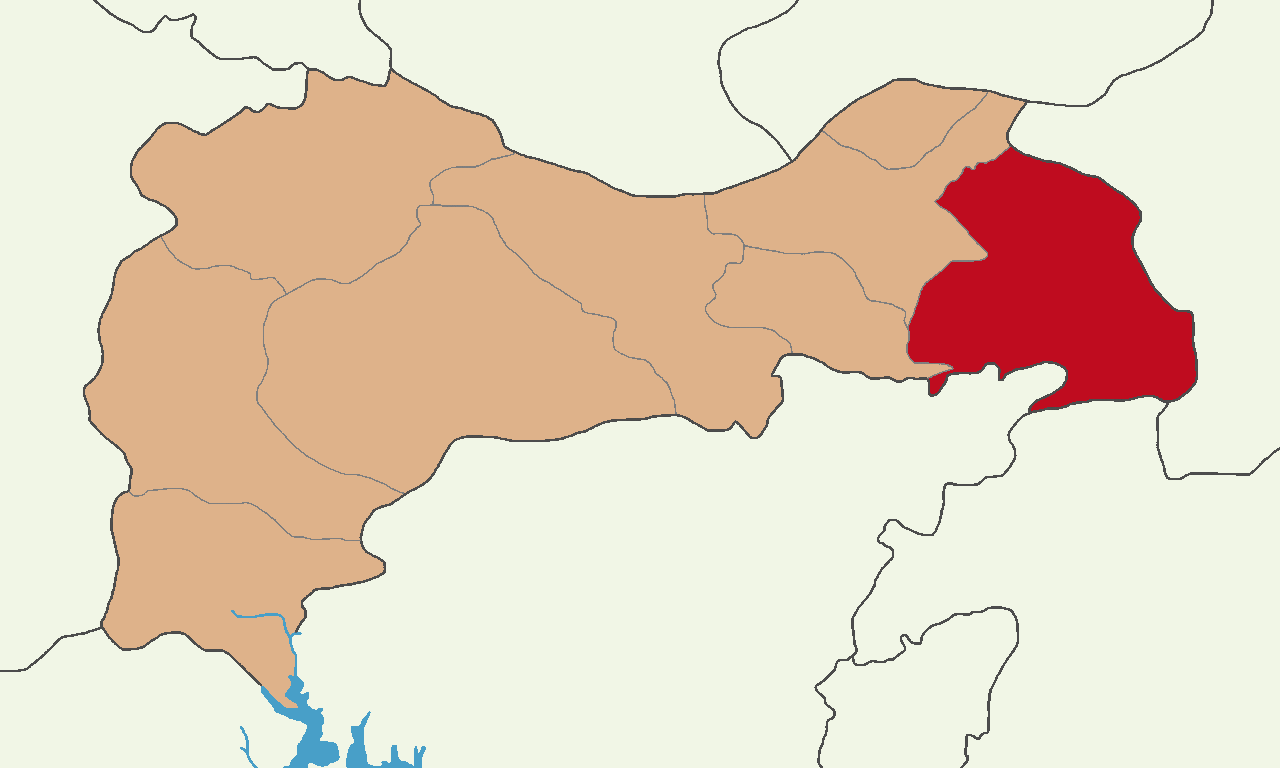
- Map showing Tercan District in Erzincan Province

- Location in Turkey
- Coordinates: 39°47′N 40°23′E
- Country: Turkey
- Province: Erzincan
- Seat: Tercan
- Area: 1,614 km^{2} (623 sq mi)
- Population (2021): 16,110
  - Density: 10.0/km^{2} (26/sq mi)
- Time zone: UTC+3 (TRT)
- Website: www.tercan.gov.tr

Tercan District is a district of Erzincan Province in Turkey. The municipality of Tercan is the seat and the district had a population of 16,110 in 2021. Its area is 1,614 km^{2}.

It is home to the Armenian Aprank Monastery, a significant landmark best known for the pair of two monumental khachkars.

== History ==
The Tercan area was inhabited in the Iron Age by Urartians, who built Şirin Kale (also known as Şirinlikale). Cimmerians from the Caucasus invaded Tercan and other Urartian areas in 714 BCE. Medes from Iran came in the 590s BCE, then much later, Romans. Tercan was an important town in the Byzantine Theodosiopolis Theme (Theodosiopolis being modern Erzurum). Arabs under Habib ibn Maslama invaded in 645 CE. Turks under Seljuk Tughril I invaded in 1054.

The Saltukid Beylik came after the Seljuks. Mama Hatun, daughter of İzzeddin Saltuk, became ruler of the beylik in 1191. She built the Mama Hatun Caravanserai in Tercan. After the Saltukids, Tercan came under the control of the Sultanate of Rum. In the 1240s, Mongols invaded. Later, Tercan was ruled by the Eretnids, then by Kadi Burhan al-Din, then by Mutahharten of Erzincan. After this, the area was fought over by the Karakoyunlu and Akkoyunlu. The Tercan area was briefly taken by the Ottomans in the Battle of Otlukbeli in 1473, but permanently incorporated into the empire by Selim I.

The Ottomans entered the newly conquered lands of the area into registers (tahrir) in 1516 and included the Tercan area in the new Vilayet of Erzincan-Bayburd. Tercan became a district (ilçe) in the Province of Erzincan after the establishment of the Turkish Republic.

In November 1895, during the Hamidian massacres, the governor of Erzurum reported that in the kaza of Tercan, Armenians from three villages requested conversion to Islam, the villages of Hınzıri (Hınzoru, Xınzori, Xntsorig, Pınarlıkaya), Korikul (Kurukol?), and Humlar. The request was denied.

== Geography ==
The Tercan district lies in the Upper Euphrates Basin in Eastern Anatolia. To the north are the Erzincan district of Çayırlı and the Erzerum district of Aşkale; to the east are the Erzerum districts of Aşkale and Çat; to the south are the Erzerum district of Çat, the Bingöl district of Yedisu, the Tunceli district of Pülümür, and the Erzincan district of Üzümlü; and to the west are the Erzincan districts of Üzümlü and Çayırlı.

The district's surface area is 1592 square kilometers. The district's highest point is Dumanlı Mountain at 3071 meters. Karasu and Tuzla Streams, branches of the Euphrates River, meet in the district.

The land of the district is stony and sloping. The main agricultural areas are the plains of Pekeriç, Kargın, Üçpınar, and Beşkaya. The annual rainfall average is 456 kilograms per square meter. Of the agricultural land in the district, 37.54% is irrigable.

== Administrative units ==
There are four municipalities in Tercan District:

- Çadırkaya
- Kargın
- Mercan
- Tercan

There are 71 villages in Tercan District:

- Ağören
- Aktaş
- Akyurt
- Altınkaya
- Armutluk
- Bağpınar
- Balyayla
- Başbudak
- Beğendik
- Beşgöze
- Beşkaya
- Beykonak
- Bulmuş
- Büklümdere
- Çalkışla
- Çatakdere
- Çayırdüzü
- Çukuryurt
- Dallıca
- Darıtepe
- Doluca
- Edebük
- Elaldı
- Elmalı
- Esenevler
- Fındıklı
- Gafurefendi
- Gedikdere
- Gevenlik
- Gökçe
- Gökdere
- Gökpınar
- Göktaş
- Güzbulak
- Hacıbayram
- Ilısu
- İkizler
- Kalecik
- Karacakışlak
- Karacaören
- Karahüseyin
- Kavaklık
- Kemerçam
- Kızılca
- Konarlı
- Köprübaşı
- Kurukol
- Kuzören
- Küçükağa
- Küllüce
- Mantarlı
- Mustafabey
- Müftüoğlu
- Oğulveren
- Ortaköy
- Sağlıca
- Sarıkaya
- Şengül
- Tepebaşı
- Topalhasan
- Üçpınar
- Yalınkaş
- Yamanlar
- Yastıkköy
- Yaylacık
- Yaylayolu
- Yaylım
- Yazıören
- Yenibucak
- Yeşilyayla
- Yuvalı

Furthermore, the district encompasses 122 hamlets.

== Demographics ==
A military survey conducted in 1835 found 113 settlements in the Tercan district. Of these settlements, 80 were villages. In addition, the survey found 20 farms (çiftlik), 5 hamlets (mezra), and 8 smaller hamlets ("stock pens," kom). The total male population of the district in that year was 6,720, of which 4,483 were Muslim (67%) and 2,237 were non-Muslim (33%).

In 1989, anthropologist Andrews counted 68 villages in the district of which Kurds were present in 54 villages and Turks in 24 villages. Same study noted that Alevis were present in 57 villages, Hanafi Muslims in 23 villages and Shafi'i Muslims in one village.

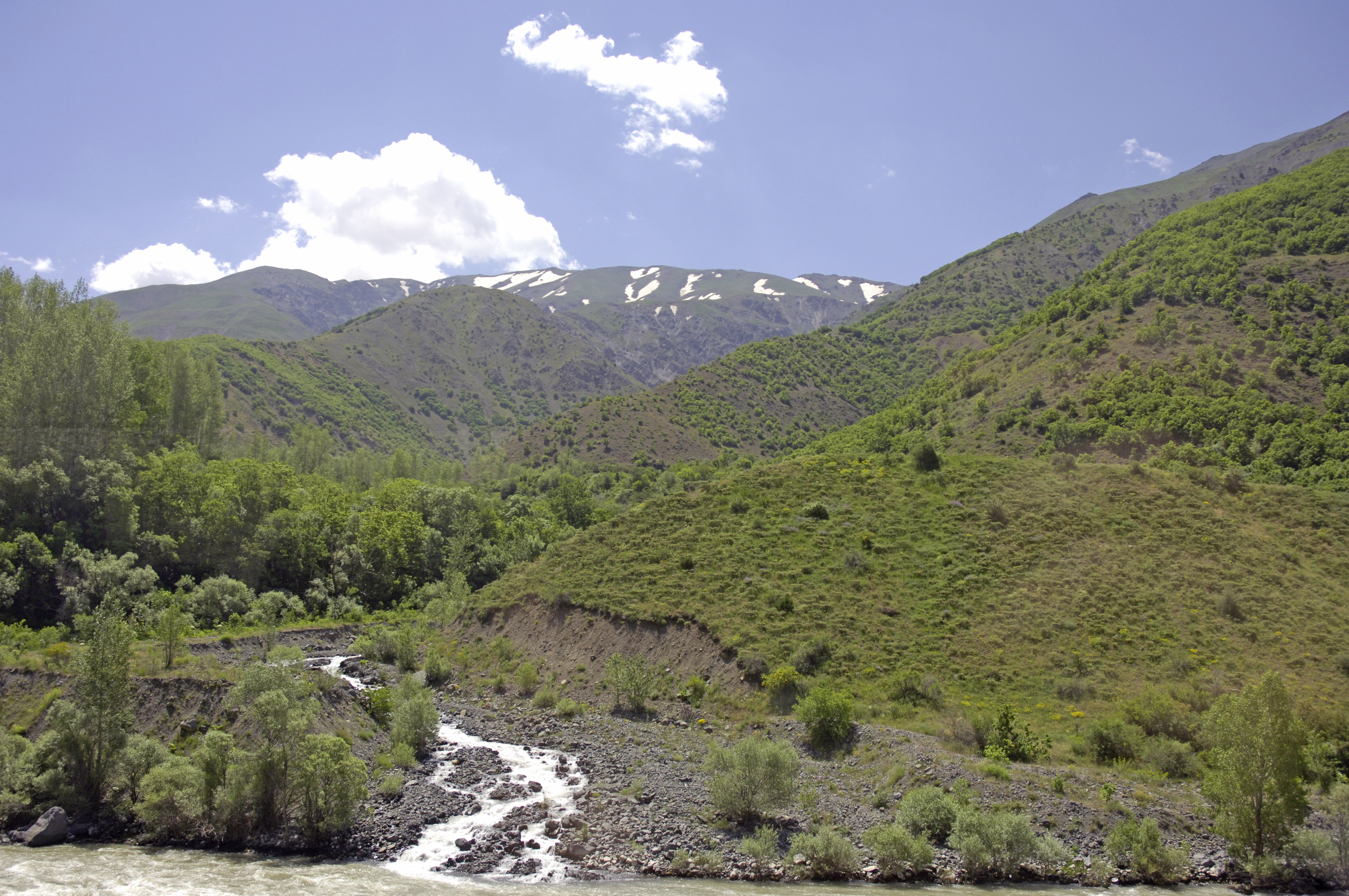
between Tercan and Erzincan
