= Lolan (tribe) =

Zaza Kurd tribe

- Tribe
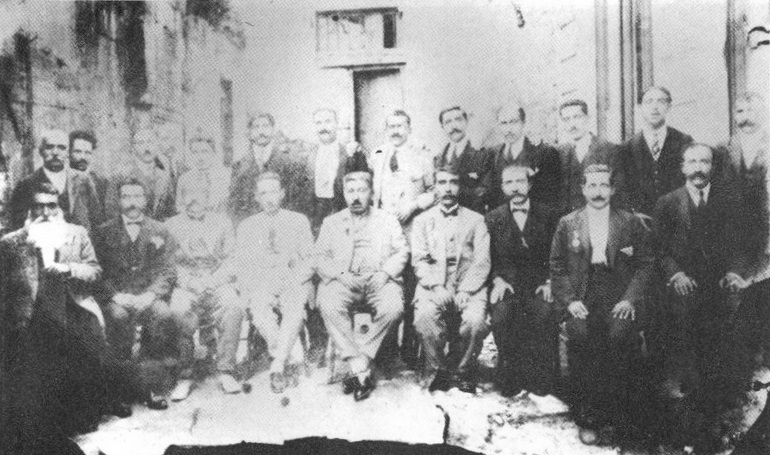
- Mehmed (Mihame in Zazaki) Ağa, the chief of Lolan, is seated in the third row from the front right, 1926
- Ethnicity: Kurdish
- Location: Eastern Anatolia, Turkey
- Demonym: Lolij (from Zazaki 'Lolanian')
- Language: Zaza, Central Kurdish, Gorani
- Religion: Islam (Kurdish Alevism)

The Lolan (Zazaki: Lol, pl. Lolan) is a Zaza-speaking Zaza Kurd tribe. Lolan is one of the tribes with a large Alevi population.

Districts where the Lolan tribe is spread: Bingöl (Yayladere), Erzincan (Tercan), Erzurum (Hınıs, Tekman), Gümüşhane (Kelkit), Muş (Varto), and Tunceli (Pülümür, Nazımiye, Çemişgezek). The part of the Lolan tribe living on the Iran–Iraq border speaks mostly Sorani and Gorani.
