= Sabirli =

Sabirli can refer to:

- Sabirli, Shamakhi
- Sabirli (horse)
- Sabırlı, Alaplı
- Sabırlı, Ergani
- Sabırlı, İliç
