= Bağıştaş =

Bağıştaş can refer to:

- Bağıştaş, İliç
- Bağıştaş 1 Dam
- Bağıştaş 2 Dam
