= Sularbaşı =

Sularbaşı can refer to:

- Sularbaşı, Alacakaya
- Sularbaşı, İliç
