= Doğanköy =

Doğanköy can refer to:

- Doğanköy, İliç
- Doğanköy, Kale
- Doğanköy, Kemah
- Doğanköy, Ergani
- Doğanköy, Osmancık
- Doğanköy, Şenkaya
- Doğanköy, Ulus
- the Turkish name for Thermeia
