= Çakmakkaya =

Çakmakkaya can refer to:

- Çakmakkaya, Alacakaya
- Çakmakkaya mine
