= Ortatepe =

Ortatepe can refer to:

- Ortatepe, İliç
- Ortatepe, Kale
