= Develi (disambiguation) =

Develi can refer to:

- Develi
- Develi, Düzce
- Develi, Ergani
- Develi Chamber of Commerce
- Develi railway station
