= Sütlüce =

Sütlüce is:

- A neighborhood of Istanbul, Sütlüce, Istanbul
- The Turkish name of a village in the Famagusta District of Cyprus, Psyllatos
- The name of 18 villages across Turkey:
  - Sütlüce, Elâzığ
  - Sütlüce, Gelibolu
  - Sütlüce, İliç
  - Sütlüce, Osmancık
