= Özlü =

Özlü can refer to the following villages in Turkey:

- Özlü, Antalya
- Özlü, İliç
- Özlü, Mut
- Özlü, Orta
