= Ortayazı =

Ortayazı can refer to:

- Ortayazı, Ergani
- Ortayazı, Suluova
