= Guleman mine =

Chromium mine in Turkey

Guleman mine is a chromium mine in Alacakaya (Guleman), Elazığ, Turkey. The mine started to operation in 1936 by Etibank.

== History ==
The first person to mention the chromium mine in Guleman was Russian geologist Chehechev. The mine around Guleman was found by Abdullah Hüsrev Guleman in 1915.

Chromium in Turkey is mostly found in Guleman, Fethiye, Erzincan-Tokat, Eskişehir-Bursa and Niğde (Toros Mountains)-Mersin areas. Until the creation of Etibank, mining in Turkey was made by foreign private capitals. Etibank started to production in Guleman in 1936. In the upcoming years, 64% of the chromium production in Turkey was made in Guleman.

While mostra (ground) mining was made at the beginning of operations in Guleman, underground mining started after 1950 due to ore decrease. As of 2020, the production is made by underground mining except a few small areas.

In 1936, Etibank started to build houses, management buildings, and social facilities, to the area what is now Alacakaya. The unplanned settling grew over time, and then merged with Guleman village and became a belde inside the ilçe of Maden. In 1990, the town obtained the status of ilçe in 1990.

== Production ==
2018'de 551 thousand tonnes of chromite ore produced in 2018, and planned to produce 950 thousand tonnes in 2019 with the improvements. Guleman field is producing half of the chromium production in Turkey.

The Gölalan field inside Guleman has 1,1 milyon tonnes of reserves, and is important with %54 Cr_{2}O_{3} grade ratio. Kef chromium field is the biggest operated chromium field in Turkey with 6,5 million tonnes of reserves, and %22-23 Cr_{2}O_{3} grade.
