= Çobanlı =

Çobanlı can refer to:

- Çobanlı, Ardahan
- Çobanlı, İliç
