= Gözlü =

Gözlü can refer to:

- Gözlü, Ergani
- Gözlü, Hazro
