= Kuzkışla =

Kuzkışla can refer to:

- Kuzkışla, Alaca
- Kuzkışla, İliç
