= Üçkardeş =

Üçkardeş can refer to:

- Üçkardeş, Ergani
- Üçkardeş, Hopa
