= Dostál =

Dostál (feminine: Dostálová) is a Czech surname. It is derived either from the verb dostát (and means '[he] kept a promise'), or from the surname Dostal. Notable people with the surname include:

- Otakar Bystřina, pen name of Ferdinand Dostál (1861–1931), Czech writer and lawyer
- Josef Dostál (botanist) (1903–1999), Czech botanist
- Josef Dostál (canoeist) (born 1993), Czech canoeist
- Karel Dostál (born 1961), Czech bobsledder
- Lukáš Dostál (born 2000), Czech ice hockey player
- Martin Dostál (born 1989), Czech footballer
- Ondrej Dostál (born 1971), Slovak politician
- Pavel Dostál (1943–2005), Czech theatre producer, writer and politician
- Roman Dostál (born 1970), Czech biathlete
- Stanislav Dostál (footballer, born 1963), Czech footballer
- Stanislav Dostál (born 1991), Czech footballer
- Veronika Dostálová (born 1992), Czech volleyball player

== See also ==
- Dostal, İliç
- 15902 Dostál, a main belt asteroid
