= Dereboyu =

Dereboyu can refer to:

- Dereboyu Avenue, avenue in North Nicosia, Cyprus
- Dereboyu, Söğüt, Bilecik province, Turkey
- Dereboyu, Seben, Bolu province, Turkey
- Dereboyu, Ergani, Diyarbakır province, Turkey
- Dereboyu, Görele, Giresun province, Turkey
- Dereboyu, Pülümür, Tunceli province, Turkey
