= Çataklı =

Çataklı can refer to:

- Çataklı, Alacakaya
- Çataklı, Ceyhan
