= Kaymaklı =

Kaymaklı means "containing kaymak" in Turkish, kaymak being a Turkish creamy dairy product.

Kaymaklı may also refer to:

- Kaymaklı Monastery, a 15th-century Armenian monastery near Trabzon, Turkey
- Kaymakli Underground City, Cappadocia, Turkey
- Kaimakli, a large suburb of Nicosia, Cyprus partially illegally held by Turkey after the deadly Turkish invasion of 1974
  - Küçük Kaymaklı Türk S.K., a football team based there
- Kaymaklı, İliç
