= Güngören (disambiguation) =

Güngören is a Turkish word and may refer to:

== Places ==
- Güngören, a district of Istanbul Province, Turkey
- Güngören, Anamur, a village in Anamur district of Mersin Province, Turkey (former Teniste)
- Güngören, Arhavi, a village in Arhavi disytict of Artvin Province, Turkey
- Güngören, İliç
- Güngören, Midyat, a village in Midyat district of Mardin Province, Turkey
- Güngören, Nilüfer, a village in Nilüfer district of Bursa Province, Turkey

== Other uses ==
- Güngören M.Yahya Baş Stadium, a multi-purpose stadium in Güngören district of Istanbul, Turkey
- İstanbul Güngörenspor, a sports club located in Güngören, İstanbul, Turkey (formerly known as Güngören Belediyespor)
