= Çilesiz =

Çilesiz can refer to:

- Çilesiz, İliç
- Çilesiz, Nusaybin
