= Dibektaş =

Dibektaş can refer to:

- Dibektaş, Ergani
- Dibektaş, Ulus
- Dibektaş, Yığılca
