= Boncuklu =

Boncuklu can refer to:

- Boncuklu, Ergani
- Boncuklu Tarla
