= Uğurköy =

Uğurköy can refer to:

- Uğurköy, Borçka
- Uğurköy, İliç
