= Balkaya =

Balkaya (literally "honey rock" in Turkish) may refer to the following places in Turkey:

- Balkaya, Gündoğmuş, a village in the district of Gündoğmuş, Antalya Province
- Balkaya, İliç
- Balkaya, Sapanca, a village in the district of Sapanca, Sakarya Province
- Balkaya, Şenkaya
- Balkaya, Sincik, a village in the district of Sincik, Adıyaman Province
- Balkaya, Sungurlu
