= Karpuzlu (disambiguation) =

Karpuzlu can refer to:

- Karpuzlu
- Karpuzlu, Ergani
- Karpuzlu, Kozluk
- Karpuzlu, Kulp
- Karpuzlu railway station
