= Bağıştaş 2 Dam =

- Location within Turkey
- Official name: Bağıştaş 2 Baraji ve HEPP
- Country: Turkey
- Location: Bağıştaş İliç, Erzincan Province
- Coordinates: 39°25′41.05″N 038°24′49.10″E
- Purpose: Power
- Status: Operational
- Construction began: 2010
- Opening date: 2014
- Owner: State Hydraulic Works

Dam and spillways
- Type of dam: Gravity
- Impounds: Karasu River
- Height: 18.5 m (61 ft)

Power Station
- Commission date: 2012-2013
- Type: Run-of-the-river
- Turbines: 3 x 16.2 MW
- Installed capacity: 48.6 MW

The Bağıştaş 1 Dam is a gravity dam on the Karasu River near İliç in Erzincan Province, eastern Turkey. The primary purpose of the dam is hydroelectric power generation and it supports a 48.6 MW power station. Construction began in 2010 and the generators were commissioned in 2012 and 2013. The dam and power plant are owned and operated by the State Hydraulic Works.

== See also ==
- Bağıştaş 1 Dam – upstream
