= Çöpler mine =

Gold mine in Turkey

- Location within Turkey
- Location: Çöpler, İliç, Erzincan Province, Turkey; 39°25′34″N 38°31′19″E
- Products: Gold
- Discovered: 1999
- Opened: 2010; 16 years ago
- Company: Anagold Inc.

The Çöpler mine (Turkish: Çöpler Altın Madeni) is a gold mine located in Erzincan Province, eastern Turkey. It is owned and operated by the Anagold Mining Inc., established in 2009. Explored in 1999, it is on an epithermal gold-silver-copper ore deposit, one of the largest in Turkey and in the world. The Çöpler mine started production in 2010.

== Background ==
Following the exploration of the epithermal gold-silver-copper ore deposit in 1999 near the Çöpler village in the İliç district of Erzincan Province, eastern Turkey, the company Anagold Alacer Inc. was founded by the American Alacer Gold Corp. and the Turkish Lidya Mining Co., a subsidiary of the Çalık Holding in an 80/20-share basis. The construction works in the mine called Çöpler began in 2009. Gold production started by December 2010. In 2008, the mining project received approval for the Environmental impact assessment (EIA). In 2020, Alacer Gold Corp. merged with the Canadian SSR Mining Inc., which moved its headquarters from Canada to Denver, Colorado, United States. The company expanded the mining area from 687 ha (1,700 acres) to around 1,746 ha (4,310 acres) and deepened the open-pit mine in a capacity expansion in accordance with two new EIA reports in 2014 and 2021. In 2019, production with 39 types of chemicals plus sulfuric acid and cyanide was switched from cyanide production. The company added 5.83 ha (14.4 acres) to the mining area in August 2023 without the need of an EAI report.

== Geology ==
Çöpler is an epithermal porphyry copper-gold ore deposit, which forms part of the Middle Eocene Çöpler–Kabataş magmatic complex in central-eastern Turkey that formed on the north-eastern margin of the Tauride-Anatolide microcontinent. The intrusive rocks at Çöpler were emplaced into Late Paleozoic-Mesozoic metamorphosed sedimentary rocks. Dating of igneous rocks indicate a brief magmatic and hydrothermal history at Çöpler less than a million year long about 43.8–44.6 Ma. The composition of magma indicate that it was generated in a convergent margin. Çöpler is, however, located too far away from the Maden–Helete arc, and therefore must have formed in a back-arc setting, similar to that in the Bingham Canyon Mine, Utah, United States.

The active Bingöl-Yedisu Fault runs across the mine area.

== Mining ==
Çöpler is an open-pit mining operation that obtains gold from oxide ore by heap leaching process, and from sulfur ore by pressurized oxidation cycle (POX) method, respectively. While the POX facility is a first in terms of gold production in Turkey, it is also one of the few POX facilities in the world.

By June 2019, the company reported that it is planned to extract more than 10 million ounce (oz) of gold. As of end 2022, the proven and probable mineral reserves are given as 47.7 million tonnes at an average grade of 2.11 g/t or 3.2 million oz of contained gold, excluding stockpiles.

In the first ten years, about 2 Moz (56.7 t) gold was produced. The mine has more than 5 Moz (around 142 t) of gold resources planned to be produced in the next few decades. The partners have invested more than 1 billion US$, making one of the largest investments made in Turkish mining and eastern Turkey.

== Environment pollution and mining accidents ==
It was claimed that 1.72 million tons of toxic chemicals would poison the soil and water for many years in the Çöpler mine, which discharge 9,000 tons of toxic waste and 5,000 m^{3}/d (180,000 cu ft/d) of water. It was observed that birds died after drinking water from the waste dams.

On 21 June 2022, a flange on a cyanide pipeline in the heap leaching field separated causing leakage, and cyanide spread into the environment. It was determined that the water resources and soil of the region were contaminated with cyanide. The mine's activities were stopped for a short time by the Ministry. An administrative fine of 16.441 million Turkish lira (ca. 1 million US$) was imposed on the mine company. Operation resumed on 23 September the same year.

On 13 February 2024 a disaster occurred when a huge mass of heap leach material slid towards a creek, and nine miners were trapped under the landslide. Eight suspects were detained as responsible, and then put before the magistrates' court after their statements at the prosecutor's office. Six of the suspects, including the Canadian-national company manager, were arrested while two suspects were released on probation.
