= Çayyaka =

Çayyaka

- Çayyaka, İliç
- Çayyaka, Sungurlu
