= Turgutlu (disambiguation) =

Turgutlu is a district and municipality in Manisa Province, Turkey. It may also refer to:

- Turgutlu, İliç, village in Erzincan Province, Turkey
- Turghudlu (tribe), Turkmen tribe
