= Hançerli =

Hançerli can refer to:

- Hançerli, Ergani
- Hançerli, Mudanya
