= Ahmetli (disambiguation) =

Ahmetli can refer to:

- Ahmetli
- Ahmetli, Bismil
- Ahmetli, Ergani
- Ahmetli, Erzincan
- Ahmetli, Sarayköy
- Ahmetli railway station
