= Bozyayla =

Bozyayla can refer to:

- Bozyayla, İliç
- Bozyayla, Sungurlu
