= Sarıpınar =

Sarıpınar can refer to:

- Sarıpınar, İliç
- Sarıpınar, İvrindi
