= Bozyer =

Bozyer can refer to:

- Bozyer, Ergani
- Bozyer, Karaçoban
- Bozyer, Seben
