= Kıralan =

Kıralan can refer to:

- Kıralan, Çivril
- Kıralan, Ergani
- Kıralan, Karaisalı
