= Salihli (disambiguation) =

Salihli can refer to:

- Salihli
- Salihli, Ergani
- Salihli, Kemaliye
- Salihli railway station
