= Çörekli =

Çörekli can refer to:

- Çörekli, İliç
- Çörekli, Midyat
