= Bereketli, Ergani =

Village in Turkey

Bereketli
- Neighbourhood
- Location in Turkey
- Coordinates: 38.1330°N 39.8205°E
- Country: Turkey
- Province: Diyarbakır
- District: Ergani
- Population (2022): 630
- Time zone: UTC+3 (TRT)

Bereketli is a neighbourhood in the municipality and district of Ergani, Diyarbakır Province in Turkey. Its population is 630 (2022).
