= Çöpler, İliç =

Village in Turkey

Çöpler
- Village
- Location in Turkey
- Coordinates: 39.426°N 38.522°E
- Country: Turkey
- Province: Erzincan
- District: İliç
- Population (2022): 289
- Time zone: UTC+3 (TRT)

Çöpler is a village in the İliç District of Erzincan Province in Turkey. The village is populated by Kurds of the Şikakî tribe and had a population of 289 in 2022.

== Mining ==
In 1999, a gold-silver-copper ore deposit was explored near the village. The Çöpler mine started production of gold in 2010. Mining accidents occurred in June 2022 when a leak in the cyanide pipeline polluted the environment, and in February 2024 when a large mass (estimated at 10 million cubic metres) of heap leach material slid down into the valley, and nine miners were trapped under the landslide.
