= Alacakaya District =

- District
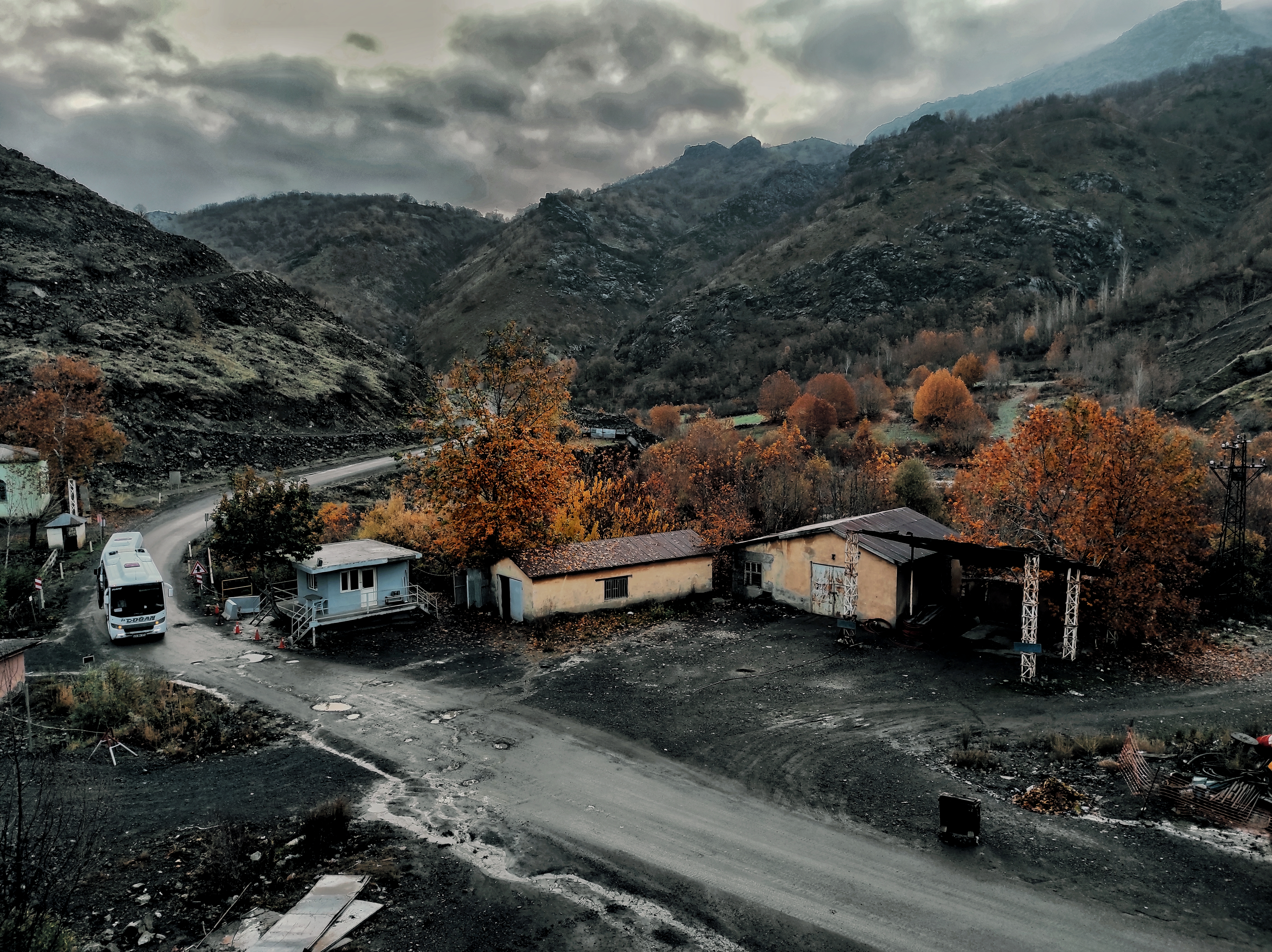
- Sori region, Alacakaya

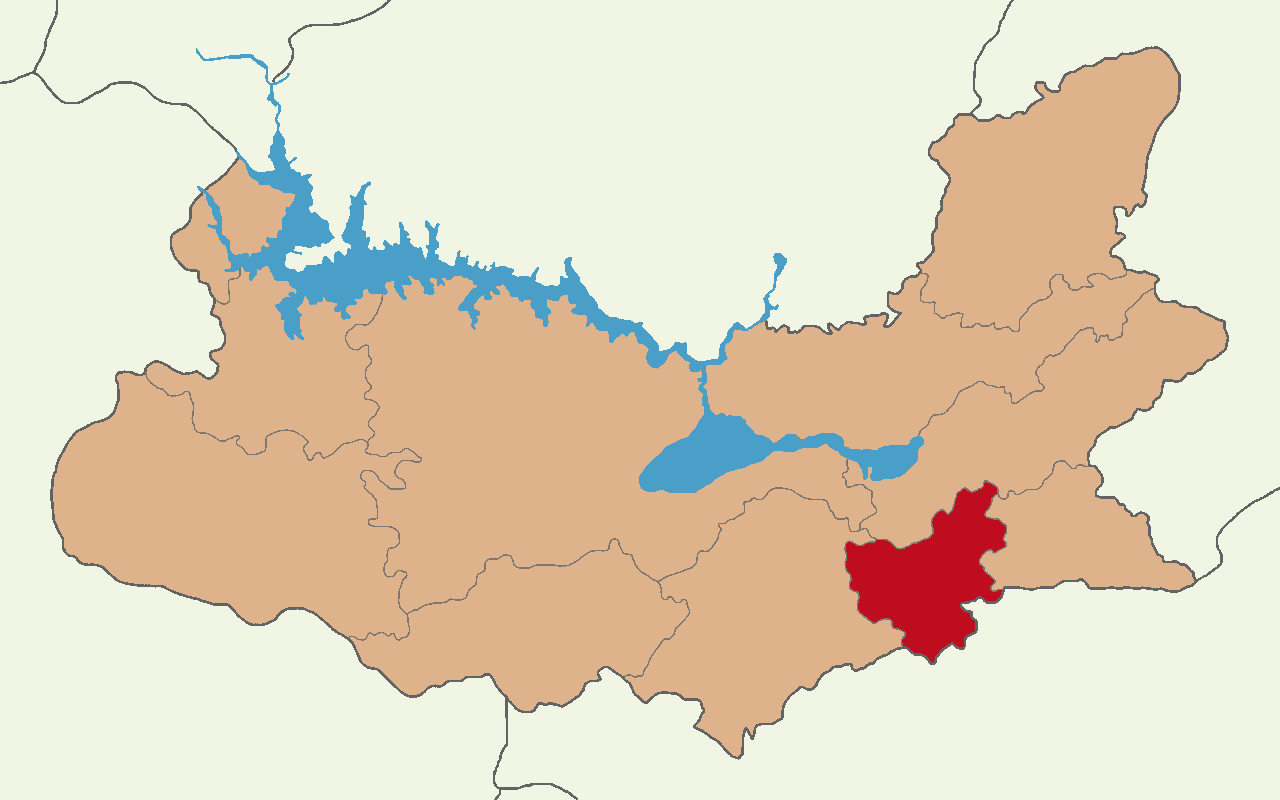
- Map showing Alacakaya District in Elazığ Province

- Location within Turkey
- Coordinates: 38°27′N 39°52′E
- Country: Turkey
- Province: Elazığ
- Seat: Alacakaya

Government
  - Kaymakam: Tarık Bahadır
- Area: 318 km^{2} (123 sq mi)
- Population (2021): 5,993
  - Density: 18.8/km^{2} (48.8/sq mi)
- Time zone: UTC+3 (TRT)

Alacakaya District is a district of Elazığ Province of Turkey. Its seat is the town Alacakaya. Its area is 318 km^{2}, and its population is 5,993 (2021). The district was established in 1990.

== History ==
The town had grown out of Guleman village in 1935, the year when Etibank founded a chromium ore processing plant near the town. The town was renamed as a result of place name changes in Turkey. With the chromium enterprise gradually growing and expanding, Alacakaya had grown and developed. The town was initially a village nominally under Maden. The town gained township (belde) rights on 30 December 1986. Alacakaya was granted district status with the Law no. 20523, published on 20 May 1990.

The renowned "cherry marble" is mined within the district boundaries and exported to various countries around the world.

== Composition ==
There is 1 municipality in Alacakaya District:

- Alacakaya

There are 10 villages in Alacakaya District:

- Bakladamlar
- Çakmakkaya
- Çanakça
- Çataklı
- Esenlik
- Gürçubuk
- Halkalı
- İncebayır
- Kayranlı
- Yalnızdamlar
