= Bahçekaşı, Ergani =

Village in Turkey

Bahçekaşı
- Neighbourhood
- Location in Turkey
- Coordinates: 38°16′N 39°44′E
- Country: Turkey
- Province: Diyarbakır
- District: Ergani
- Population (2022): 27
- Time zone: UTC+3 (TRT)

Bahçekaşı is a neighbourhood in the municipality and district of Ergani, Diyarbakır Province in Turkey. Its population is 27 (2022).
