= Morkoyun, Ergani =

Village in Turkey

Morkoyun
- Neighbourhood
- Location in Turkey
- Coordinates: 38°13′N 39°54′E
- Country: Turkey
- Province: Diyarbakır
- District: Ergani
- Population (2022): 842
- Time zone: UTC+3 (TRT)

Morkoyun is a neighbourhood in the municipality and district of Ergani, Diyarbakır Province in Turkey. Its population is 842 (2022).
