= Dallıdağ, Ergani =

Village in Turkey

Dallıdağ
- Neighbourhood
- Location in Turkey
- Coordinates: 38°18′20″N 39°50′21″E
- Country: Turkey
- Province: Diyarbakır
- District: Ergani
- Population (2022): 247
- Time zone: UTC+3 (TRT)

Dallıdağ (Kurdish: Zirka) is a neighbourhood in the municipality and district of Ergani, Diyarbakır Province in Turkey. It is populated by Kurds of the Îzol tribe and had a population of 247 in 2022.
