= Özbilek, Ergani =

Village in Turkey

Özbilek
- Neighbourhood
- Location in Turkey
- Coordinates: 38°15′00″N 39°51′18″E
- Country: Turkey
- Province: Diyarbakır
- District: Ergani
- Population (2022): 579
- Time zone: UTC+3 (TRT)

Özbilek (Kurdish: Memelan, Memê Alan) is a neighbourhood in the municipality and district of Ergani, Diyarbakır Province in Turkey. It is populated by Kurds of the Hesenan tribe and had a population of 579 in 2022.

In 2025, a mosaic was uncovered dating to the late Roman or early Byzantine era. The artwork features geometric designs, a Star of David encircling a cross, and a six-line inscription in Greek.
