= Esenlik, Alacakaya =

Village in Turkey

Esenlik
- Village
- Location in Turkey
- Coordinates: 38°31′9″N 39°57′3″E
- Country: Turkey
- Province: Elazığ
- District: Alacakaya
- Population (2021): 277
- Time zone: UTC+3 (TRT)

Esenlik is a village in the Alacakaya District of Elazığ Province in Turkey. Its population is 277 (2021). The village is populated by Kurds.
