= Kayan, Ergani =

Village in Turkey

Kayan
- Neighbourhood
- Location in Turkey
- Coordinates: 38°09′N 39°43′E
- Country: Turkey
- Province: Diyarbakır
- District: Ergani
- Population (2022): 242
- Time zone: UTC+3 (TRT)

Kayan is a neighbourhood in the municipality and district of Ergani, Diyarbakır Province in Turkey. Its population is 242 (2022).
