= Yeniköy, Ergani =

Village in Turkey

Yeniköy
- Neighbourhood
- Location in Turkey
- Coordinates: 38.1669°N 39.7716°E
- Country: Turkey
- Province: Diyarbakır
- District: Ergani
- Population (2022): 245
- Time zone: UTC+3 (TRT)

Yeniköy is a neighbourhood in the municipality and district of Ergani, Diyarbakır Province in Turkey. Its population is 245 (2022).
