= Akçakale, Ergani =

Village in Turkey

Akçakale
- Neighbourhood
- Location in Turkey
- Coordinates: 38.0882°N 39.7000°E
- Country: Turkey
- Province: Diyarbakır
- District: Ergani
- Population (2022): 1,676
- Time zone: UTC+3 (TRT)

Akçakale is a neighbourhood in the municipality and district of Ergani, Diyarbakır Province in Turkey. Its population is 1,676 (2022).
