= Küçükgümüşlü, İliç =

Village in Turkey

Küçükgümüşlü
- Village
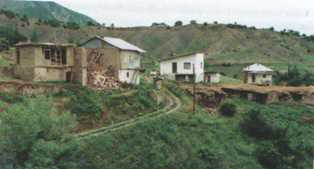

- Location within Turkey
- Coordinates: 39°40′N 38°25′E
- Country: Turkey
- Province: Erzincan
- District: İliç
- Population (2022): 8
- Time zone: UTC+3 (TRT)

Küçükgümüşlü is a village in the İliç District of Erzincan Province in Turkey. Its population is 8 (2022).
