= Kozluca, İliç =

Village in Turkey

Kozluca
- Village
- Location in Turkey
- Coordinates: 39.763°N 38.419°E
- Country: Turkey
- Province: Erzincan
- District: İliç
- Population (2022): 29
- Time zone: UTC+3 (TRT)

Kozluca is a village in the İliç District of Erzincan Province in Turkey. Its population is 29 (2022).
