= Yolbulan, Ergani =

Village in Turkey

Yolbulan
- Neighbourhood
- Location in Turkey
- Coordinates: 38°14′N 39°38′E
- Country: Turkey
- Province: Diyarbakır
- District: Ergani
- Population (2022): 658
- Time zone: UTC+3 (TRT)

Yolbulan is a neighbourhood in the municipality and district of Ergani, Diyarbakır Province in Turkey. Its population is 658 (2022).
