= Hendekköy, Ergani =

Village in Turkey

Hendekköy
- Neighbourhood
- Location in Turkey
- Coordinates: 38°09′18″N 39°37′37″E
- Country: Turkey
- Province: Diyarbakır
- District: Ergani
- Population (2022): 1,018
- Time zone: UTC+3 (TRT)

Hendekköy is a neighbourhood in the municipality and district of Ergani, Diyarbakır Province in Turkey. Its population is 1,018 (2022).
