= Yolköprü, Ergani =

Village in Turkey

Yolköprü
- Neighbourhood
- Location in Turkey
- Coordinates: 38°15′N 39°42′E
- Country: Turkey
- Province: Diyarbakır
- District: Ergani
- Population (2022): 171
- Time zone: UTC+3 (TRT)

Yolköprü (Kurdish: Qalxane) is a neighbourhood in the municipality and district of Ergani, Diyarbakır Province in Turkey. The village is populated by Kurds of the Şadiyan tribe and had a population of 171 in 2022.
