= Caferan, Ergani =

Village in Turkey

Caferan
- Neighbourhood
- Location in Turkey
- Coordinates: 38.2272°N 39.8853°E
- Country: Turkey
- Province: Diyarbakır
- District: Ergani
- Population (2022): 405
- Time zone: UTC+3 (TRT)

Caferan is a neighbourhood in the municipality and district of Ergani, Diyarbakır Province in Turkey. Its population is 405 (2022).
