= Kumçi, Ergani =

Village in Turkey

Kumçi
- Neighbourhood
- Location in Turkey
- Coordinates: 38°04′N 39°38′E
- Country: Turkey
- Province: Diyarbakır
- District: Ergani
- Population (2022): 383
- Time zone: UTC+3 (TRT)

Kumçi is a neighbourhood in the municipality and district of Ergani, Diyarbakır Province in Turkey. Its population is 383 (2022).
