= İslamköy, İliç =

Village in Turkey

İslamköy
- Village
- Location in Turkey
- Coordinates: 39.695°N 38.562°E
- Country: Turkey
- Province: Erzincan
- District: İliç
- Population (2022): 76
- Time zone: UTC+3 (TRT)

İslamköy is a village in the İliç District of Erzincan Province in Turkey. Its population is 76 (2022).
