= İncehıdır, Ergani =

Village in Turkey

İncehıdır
- Neighbourhood
- Location in Turkey
- Coordinates: 38°01′17″N 39°38′11″E
- Country: Turkey
- Province: Diyarbakır
- District: Ergani
- Population (2022): 1,622
- Time zone: UTC+3 (TRT)

İncehıdır (Kurdish: Încexidir) is a neighbourhood in the municipality and district of Ergani, Diyarbakır Province in Turkey. It is populated by Kurds of the Îzol tribe and had a population of 1,622 in 2022.
