= Gözekaya, Ergani =

Village in Turkey

Gözekaya
- Neighbourhood
- Location in Turkey
- Coordinates: 38°18′N 39°52′E
- Country: Turkey
- Province: Diyarbakır
- District: Ergani
- Population (2022): 996
- Time zone: UTC+3 (TRT)

Gözekaya is a neighbourhood in the municipality and district of Ergani, Diyarbakır Province in Turkey. Its population is 996 (2022).
