= Kocaali, Ergani =

Village in Turkey

Kocaali
- Neighbourhood
- Location in Turkey
- Coordinates: 38°8′42″N 39°44′28″E
- Country: Turkey
- Province: Diyarbakır
- District: Ergani
- Population (2022): 395
- Time zone: UTC+3 (TRT)

Kocaali is a neighbourhood in the municipality and district of Ergani, Diyarbakır Province in Turkey. Its population is 395 (2022).
