= Canveren, Ergani =

Village in Turkey

Canveren
- Neighbourhood
- Location in Turkey
- Coordinates: 38°07′N 39°54′E
- Country: Turkey
- Province: Diyarbakır
- District: Ergani
- Population (2022): 616
- Time zone: UTC+3 (TRT)

Canveren is a neighbourhood in the municipality and district of Ergani, Diyarbakır Province in Turkey. Its population is 616 (2022).
