= Akdoğu, İliç =

Village in Turkey

Akdoğu
- Village
- Location in Turkey
- Coordinates: 39.4118°N 38.7711°E
- Country: Turkey
- Province: Erzincan
- District: İliç
- Population (2022): 13
- Time zone: UTC+3 (TRT)

Akdoğu is a village in the İliç District of Erzincan Province in Turkey. Its population is 13 (2022).
