= Büyükgümüşlü, İliç =

Village in Turkey

Büyükgümüşlü
- Village
- Location in Turkey
- Coordinates: 39°40′N 38°24′E
- Country: Turkey
- Province: Erzincan
- District: İliç
- Population (2022): 37
- Time zone: UTC+3 (TRT)

Büyükgümüşlü is a village in the İliç District of Erzincan Province in Turkey. Its population is 37 (2022).
