= Bağcağız, İliç =

Village in Turkey

Bağcağız
- Village
- Location in Turkey
- Coordinates: 39.7423°N 38.4370°E
- Country: Turkey
- Province: Erzincan
- District: İliç
- Population (2022): 38
- Time zone: UTC+3 (TRT)

Bağcağız is a village in the İliç District of Erzincan Province in Turkey. Its population is 38 (2022).
