= Boğazköy, Ergani =

Village in Turkey

Boğazköy
- Neighbourhood
- Location in Turkey
- Coordinates: 38.2728°N 39.6929°E
- Country: Turkey
- Province: Diyarbakır
- District: Ergani
- Population (2022): 105
- Time zone: UTC+3 (TRT)

Boğazköy is a neighbourhood in the municipality and district of Ergani, located in Diyarbakır Province in Turkey. Its population is 105 (2022).
