= Usluca, Ergani =

Village in Turkey

Usluca
- Neighbourhood
- Country: Turkey
- Province: Diyarbakır
- District: Ergani
- Population (2022): 127
- Time zone: UTC+3 (TRT)

Usluca is a neighbourhood in the municipality and district of Ergani, Diyarbakır Province in Turkey. Its population is 127 (2022).
