= Leventpınarı, İliç =

Village in Turkey

Leventpınarı
- Village
- Location in Turkey
- Coordinates: 39.619°N 38.611°E
- Country: Turkey
- Province: Erzincan
- District: İliç
- Population (2022): 88
- Time zone: UTC+3 (TRT)

Leventpınarı is a village in the İliç District of Erzincan Province in Turkey. Its population is 88 (2022).
