= Deringöze, Ergani =

Village in Turkey

Deringöze
- Neighbourhood
- Location in Turkey
- Coordinates: 38°17′N 39°53′E
- Country: Turkey
- Province: Diyarbakır
- District: Ergani
- Population (2022): 86
- Time zone: UTC+3 (TRT)

Deringöze is a neighbourhood in the municipality and district of Ergani, Diyarbakır Province in Turkey. Its population is 86 (2022).
