= Yılmazköy, İliç =

Village in Turkey

Yılmazköy
- Village
- Location in Turkey
- Coordinates: 39.656°N 38.396°E
- Country: Turkey
- Province: Erzincan
- District: İliç
- Population (2022): 20
- Time zone: UTC+3 (TRT)

Yılmazköy is a village in the İliç District of Erzincan Province in Turkey. Its population is 20 (2022).
