= Ergani =

- District and municipality
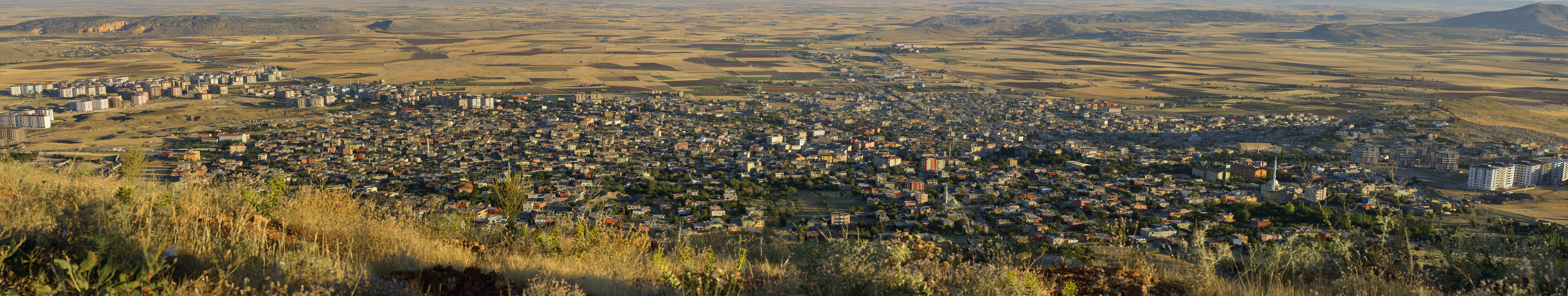

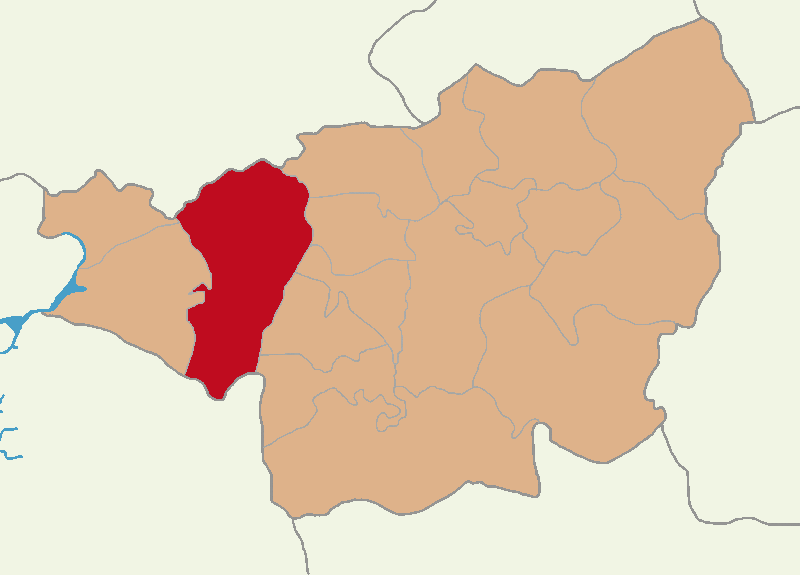
- Map showing Ergani District in Diyarbakır Province

- Location within Turkey
- Coordinates: 38°16′09″N 39°45′42″E
- Country: Turkey
- Province: Diyarbakır
- Area: 1,510 km^{2} (580 sq mi)
- Population (2022): 136,099
  - Density: 90.1/km^{2} (233/sq mi)
- Time zone: UTC+3 (TRT)
- Postal code: 21950
- Area code: 0412
- Website: www.ergani.bel.tr

Ergani (Ottoman Turkish: عثمانيه, romanized: Osmaniye, Kurdish: Erxenî), formerly known as Arghni or Arghana, is a municipality and district of Diyarbakır Province, Turkey. Its area is 1,510 km^{2}, and its population is 136,099 (2022). Ergani District is located in the administrative as the Southeastern Anatolia Region, but as a geographical region it is located in Eastern Anatolia. The mayor is Ahmet Kaya (HDP) since 2019. Ahmet Karaaslan was appointed as the District Governor.

== History ==
Trade has flourished between Ergani and Mesopotamia during the third millennium BC. Ergani has a rich history of being a copper mining region. Copper supplied the entire region from Anatolia, Northern Levant to Upper Mesopotamia, but most importantly down the Euphrates river to Lower Mesopotamia.

Nearby sites important for the copper industry was Arslandtepe to the west and Norsun Tepe to the east. This region eventually produced arsenical copper, where the copper was added with arsenic. Arsenic is highly poisonous and was later replaced by tin.

=== Çayönü ===
Near the village of Sesverenpınar, among the Hilar rocks Çayönü hill was first settled in c. 7500 BC, and was continuously inhabited until 5000 BC (but only occasionally since then). Remains have been found from the earlier habitation, one of the most important archaeological finds of its era.

== Education ==
There is 107 elementary schools, and 3 Anatolian high schools in Ergani. There is also a Dicle University Vocational School in Ergani.

== Composition ==
There are 102 neighbourhoods in Ergani District:

- Adnan Menderes
- Ahmetli
- Akçakale
- Akçoban
- Alitaşı
- Armutova
- Aşağıbitikçi
- Aşağıkuyulu
- Azıklı
- Aziziye
- Bademli
- Bagür
- Bahçekaşı
- Bereketli
- Boğazköy
- Boncuklu
- Bozyer
- Caferan
- Çakartaş
- Çakırfakır
- Canveren
- Çayırdere
- Çayköy
- Çimlihöyük
- Cömert
- Coşkun
- Çukurdere
- Dağarası
- Dallıdağ
- Değirmendere
- Demirli
- Dereboyu
- Deringöze
- Develi
- Devletkuşu
- Dibektaş
- Doğanköy
- Fatih
- Fevzi Çakmak
- Giraylar
- Gökiçi
- Gözekaya
- Gözlü
- Gülerce
- Güneştepe
- Güzelyurt
- Hançerli
- Hendekköy
- Hilar
- İncehıdır
- İstasyon
- Karaburçak
- Karpuzlu
- Karşıbağlar
- Kavaklı
- Kavurmaküpü
- Kayan
- Kemaliye
- Kemertaş
- Kesentaş
- Kıralan
- Kocaali
- Kömürtaş
- Kortaş
- Koyunalan
- Kumçi
- Morkoyun
- Namıkkemal
- Olgun
- Ortaağaç
- Ortayazı
- Otluca
- Özbilek
- Pınarkaya
- Sabırlı
- Salihli
- Sallar
- Sallıca
- Sanayi
- Saray
- Savaş
- Selmanköy
- Şirinevler
- Sökündüzü
- Şölen
- Tevekli
- Üçkardeş
- Usluca
- Üzümlü
- Yakacık
- Yamaçlar
- Yapraklı
- Yayvantepe
- Yeniköy
- Yeşilköy
- Yolbulan
- Yolköprü
- Yoncalı
- Yukarıbitikçi
- Yukarıkarpuzlu
- Yukarıkuyulu
- Ziyaret

== Climate ==
Ergani has a hot-summer Mediterranean climate (Köppen climate classification: Csa).

Climate data for Ergani (1991–2020)
Month	Jan	Feb	Mar	Apr	May	Jun	Jul	Aug	Sep	Oct	Nov	Dec	Year
Mean daily maximum °C (°F)	6.7 (44.1)	8.3 (46.9)	13.6 (56.5)	19.4 (66.9)	25.5 (77.9)	32.6 (90.7)	37.6 (99.7)	37.8 (100.0)	32.5 (90.5)	24.8 (76.6)	15.6 (60.1)	8.9 (48.0)	22.0 (71.6)
Daily mean °C (°F)	2.9 (37.2)	4.0 (39.2)	8.7 (47.7)	13.9 (57.0)	19.6 (67.3)	26.3 (79.3)	31.1 (88.0)	31.0 (87.8)	25.6 (78.1)	18.6 (65.5)	10.4 (50.7)	4.9 (40.8)	16.5 (61.7)
Mean daily minimum °C (°F)	−0.2 (31.6)	0.6 (33.1)	4.5 (40.1)	9.0 (48.2)	13.9 (57.0)	19.8 (67.6)	24.6 (76.3)	24.4 (75.9)	19.3 (66.7)	13.3 (55.9)	6.4 (43.5)	1.8 (35.2)	11.5 (52.7)
Average precipitation mm (inches)	117.4 (4.62)	97.78 (3.85)	97.32 (3.83)	81.3 (3.20)	58.41 (2.30)	10.66 (0.42)	0.98 (0.04)	1.81 (0.07)	8.53 (0.34)	44.17 (1.74)	76.3 (3.00)	114.27 (4.50)	708.93 (27.91)
Average precipitation days (≥ 1.0 mm)	8.9	9.6	9.4	9.0	6.7	2.6	1.1	1.6	1.8	4.9	6.6	9.7	71.9
Average relative humidity (%)	68.3	65.5	60.5	57.7	51.9	35.1	27.4	28.5	34.8	49.2	59.1	68.7	50.8
Source: NOAA
