= Boyalık, İliç =

Village in Turkey

Boyalık
- Village
- Location in Turkey
- Coordinates: 39.5644°N 38.6390°E
- Country: Turkey
- Province: Erzincan
- District: İliç
- Population (2022): 169
- Time zone: UTC+3 (TRT)

Boyalık is a village in the İliç District of Erzincan Province in Turkey. Its population is 169 (2022). As of 2000, it has 2 mosques and 80 houses along with 45 village guards. Although the village itself has no historical remains, there are well-preserved traces of the old caravan route called the Padişah Yolu, or "sultan's road", below Boyalık to the south. This section of the road is scoured from the mountainside and represents part of the ancient Roman road running east to Kemah and Erzincan. The road comes to Boyalık from Hasanova in the west and climbs eastward through "a fertile valley lined with stunted oak trees" to the high plain called Gâvuroluğu, or the "infidels' passage".
