= Çanakça, Alacakaya =

Village in Turkey

Çanakça
- Village
- Location in Turkey
- Coordinates: 38°26′38″N 39°46′29″E
- Country: Turkey
- Province: Elazığ
- District: Alacakaya
- Population (2021): 51
- Time zone: UTC+3 (TRT)

Çanakça is a village in the Alacakaya District of Elazığ Province in Turkey. Its population is 51 (2021). The village is populated by Kurds.
