= Devletkuşu, Ergani =

Village in Turkey

Devletkuşu
- Neighbourhood
- Location in Turkey
- Coordinates: 38°20′50″N 39°45′39″E
- Country: Turkey
- Province: Diyarbakır
- District: Ergani
- Population (2022): 100
- Time zone: UTC+3 (TRT)

Devletkuşu is a neighbourhood in the municipality and district of Ergani, Diyarbakır Province in Turkey. Its population is 100 (2022).
