= Aşağıbitikçi, Ergani =

Village in Turkey

Aşağıbitikçi
- Neighbourhood
- Location in Turkey
- Coordinates: 37°58′16″N 39°39′57″E
- Country: Turkey
- Province: Diyarbakır
- District: Ergani
- Population (2022): 689
- Time zone: UTC+3 (TRT)

Aşağıbitikçi is a neighbourhood in the municipality and district of Ergani, Diyarbakır Province in Turkey. Its population is 689 (2022).
