= Yukarıkuyulu, Ergani =

Village in Turkey

Yukarıkuyulu
- Neighbourhood
- Country: Turkey
- Province: Diyarbakır
- District: Ergani
- Population (2022): 714
- Time zone: UTC+3 (TRT)

Yukarıkuyulu is a neighbourhood in the municipality and district of Ergani, Diyarbakır Province in Turkey. Its population is 714 (2022).
