= Çayköy, Ergani =

Village in Turkey

Çayköy
- Neighbourhood
- Location within Turkey
- Country: Turkey
- Province: Diyarbakır
- District: Ergani
- Population (2022): 169
- Time zone: UTC+3 (TRT)

Çayköy is a neighbourhood in the municipality and district of Ergani, Diyarbakır Province in Turkey. Its population, as of 2022, is 169.
