= Atma, İliç =

Village in Turkey

Atma
- Village
- Location in Turkey
- Coordinates: 39.5014°N 38.6263°E
- Country: Turkey
- Province: Erzincan
- District: İliç
- Population (2022): 44
- Time zone: UTC+3 (TRT)

Atma is a village in the İliç District of Erzincan Province in Turkey. The village is populated by Kurds of the Atma tribe and had a population of 44 in 2022.

The hamlet of Yeşilyurt is attached to the village.
