= Kömürtaş, Ergani =

Village in Turkey

Kömürtaş
- Neighbourhood
- Location in Turkey
- Coordinates: 38°14′N 39°48′E
- Country: Turkey
- Province: Diyarbakır
- District: Ergani
- Population (2022): 804
- Time zone: UTC+3 (TRT)

Kömürtaş is a neighbourhood in the municipality and district of Ergani, Diyarbakır Province in Turkey. Its population is 804 (2022).
