= Kortaş, Ergani =

Village in Turkey

Kortaş
- Neighbourhood
- Location in Turkey
- Coordinates: 38°18′N 39°39′E
- Country: Turkey
- Province: Diyarbakır
- District: Ergani
- Population (2022): 668
- Time zone: UTC+3 (TRT)

Kortaş is a neighbourhood in the municipality and district of Ergani, Diyarbakır Province, Turkey. Its population is 668 (2022).
