= Dikmen, İliç =

Village in Turkey

Dikmen
- Village
- Location in Turkey
- Coordinates: 39°40′41″N 38°34′37″E
- Country: Turkey
- Province: Erzincan
- District: İliç
- Population (2022): 38
- Time zone: UTC+3 (TRT)

Dikmen is a village in the İliç District of Erzincan Province in Turkey. Its population is 38 (2022).
