= Kayranlı, Alacakaya =

Village in Turkey

Kayranlı
- Village
- Location in Turkey
- Coordinates: 38°27′25″N 39°47′36″E
- Country: Turkey
- Province: Elazığ
- District: Alacakaya
- Population (2021): 112
- Time zone: UTC+3 (TRT)

Kayranlı is a village in the Alacakaya District of Elazığ Province in Turkey. Its population is 112 (2021). The village is populated by Kurds.
