= Alitaşı, Ergani =

Village in Turkey

Alitaşı
- Neighbourhood
- Location in Turkey
- Coordinates: 37°48′49″N 39°40′1″E
- Country: Turkey
- Province: Diyarbakır
- District: Ergani
- Population (2022): 1,065
- Time zone: UTC+3 (TRT)

Alitaşı (Kurdish: Elîtaş) is a neighbourhood in the municipality and district of Ergani, Diyarbakır Province in Turkey. It is populated by Kurds of the Îzol tribe and had a population of 1,065 in 2022.
