= Yayvantepe, Ergani =

Village in Turkey

Yayvantepe
- Neighbourhood
- Country: Turkey
- Province: Diyarbakır
- District: Ergani
- Population (2022): 66
- Time zone: UTC+3 (TRT)

Yayvantepe is a neighbourhood in the municipality and district of Ergani, Diyarbakır Province in Turkey. Its population is 66 (2022).
