= Karşıbağlar, Ergani =

Village in Turkey

Karşıbağlar
- Neighbourhood
- Location in Turkey
- Coordinates: 38°14′N 39°50′E
- Country: Turkey
- Province: Diyarbakır
- District: Ergani
- Population (2022): 280
- Time zone: UTC+3 (TRT)

Karşıbağlar is a neighbourhood in the municipality and district of Ergani, Diyarbakır Province in Turkey. Its population is 280 (2022).
