= Akçoban, Ergani =

Village in Turkey

Akçoban
- Neighbourhood
- Location in Turkey
- Coordinates: 37°56′13″N 39°41′44″E
- Country: Turkey
- Province: Diyarbakır
- District: Ergani
- Population (2022): 655
- Time zone: UTC+3 (TRT)

Akçoban is a neighbourhood in the municipality and district of Ergani, Diyarbakır Province in Turkey. Its population is 655 (2022). The village's former name was Tortini.
