= Sarıkonak, İliç =

Village in Turkey

Sarıkonak
- Village
- Location in Turkey
- Coordinates: 39.499°N 38.362°E
- Country: Turkey
- Province: Erzincan
- District: İliç
- Population (2022): 36
- Time zone: UTC+3 (TRT)

Sarıkonak is a village in the İliç District of Erzincan Province in Turkey. Its population is 36 (2022).
