= Dolugün, İliç =

Village in Turkey

Dolugün
- Village
- Location in Turkey
- Coordinates: 39°27′N 38°44′E
- Country: Turkey
- Province: Erzincan
- District: İliç
- Population (2022): 6
- Time zone: UTC+3 (TRT)

Dolugün is a village in the İliç District of Erzincan Province in Turkey. Its population is 6 (2022).
