= Ağıldere, İliç =

Village in Turkey

Ağıldere
- Village
- Location in Turkey
- Coordinates: 39.5624°N 38.3366°E
- Country: Turkey
- Province: Erzincan
- District: İliç
- Population (2022): 34
- Time zone: UTC+3 (TRT)

Ağıldere is a village in the İliç District of Erzincan Province in Turkey. Its population is 34 (2022).
