= Sallıca, Ergani =

Village in Turkey

Sallıca
- Neighbourhood
- Location in Turkey
- Coordinates: 38°10′57″N 39°53′6″E
- Country: Turkey
- Province: Diyarbakır
- District: Ergani
- Population (2022): 240
- Time zone: UTC+3 (TRT)

Sallıca (Kurdish: Tayan) is a neighbourhood in the municipality and district of Ergani, Diyarbakır Province in Turkey. It is populated by Kurds of the Cemaldini tribe and had a population of 240 in 2022.
