= Erzincan Dam =

Coordinates: 39.804°N 39.2928°E

Erzincan İliç Dam
- Location: Turkey
- Construction began: 1991
- Opening date: 2011

Dam and spillways
- Type of dam: Embankment, earth-fill
- Impounds: Cardakli Creek
- Height: 76.2 m (250 ft)
- Spillway capacity: 2.637,60 m³/s

Reservoir
- Total capacity: 9,930,000 m^{3} (8,050 acre⋅ft)
- Catchment area: 15.587 km^{2}

Erzincan Dam is an embankment dam on Cardakli Creek in Erzincan, Turkey. The development was backed by the Turkish State Hydraulic Works. Construction on the dam went from 1991 to 1997.

== See also ==
- List of dams and reservoirs in Turkey
