= Kapıkaya, İliç =

Village in Turkey

Kapıkaya
- Village
- Location in Turkey
- Coordinates: 39.392°N 38.760°E
- Country: Turkey
- Province: Erzincan
- District: İliç
- Population (2022): 15
- Time zone: UTC+3 (TRT)

Kapıkaya is a village in the İliç District of Erzincan Province in Turkey. Its population is 15 (2022).
