= Azıklı, Ergani =

Village in Turkey

Azıklı
- Neighbourhood
- Location in Turkey
- Coordinates: 38.1204°N 39.7785°E
- Country: Turkey
- Province: Diyarbakır
- District: Ergani
- Population (2022): 422
- Time zone: UTC+3 (TRT)

Azıklı is a neighbourhood in the municipality and district of Ergani, Diyarbakır Province in Turkey. Its population is 422 (2022). It is a Kurdish village.
