= Koyunalan, Ergani =

Village in Turkey

Koyunalan
- Neighbourhood
- Location in Turkey
- Coordinates: 38°08′N 39°56′E
- Country: Turkey
- Province: Diyarbakır
- District: Ergani
- Population (2022): 271
- Time zone: UTC+3 (TRT)

Koyunalan is a neighbourhood in the municipality and district of Ergani, Diyarbakır Province in Turkey. Its population is 271 (2022).
