= Doruksaray, İliç =

Village in Turkey

Doruksaray
- Village
- Location in Turkey
- Coordinates: 39°34′N 38°31′E
- Country: Turkey
- Province: Erzincan
- District: İliç
- Population (2022): 53
- Time zone: UTC+3 (TRT)

Doruksaray (Kurdish: Kamho) is a village in the İliç District of Erzincan Province in Turkey. The village is populated by Kurds of the Berazî tribe and had a population of 53 in 2022.
