= Aşağıkuyulu, Ergani =

Village in Turkey

Aşağıkuyulu
- Neighbourhood
- Location in Turkey
- Coordinates: 38.1663°N 39.9054°E
- Country: Turkey
- Province: Diyarbakır
- District: Ergani
- Population (2022): 838
- Time zone: UTC+3 (TRT)

Aşağıkuyulu is a neighbourhood in the municipality and district of Ergani, Diyarbakır Province in Turkey. Its population is 838 (2022).
