= Coşkun, Ergani =

Village in Turkey

Coşkun
- Neighbourhood
- Location in Turkey
- Coordinates: 37°59′49″N 39°50′54″E
- Country: Turkey
- Province: Diyarbakır
- District: Ergani
- Population (2022): 445
- Time zone: UTC+3 (TRT)

Coşkun is a neighbourhood in the municipality and district of Ergani, Diyarbakır Province in Turkey. Its population is 445 (2022).
