= İliç District =

District of Erzincan Province, Turkey

- District
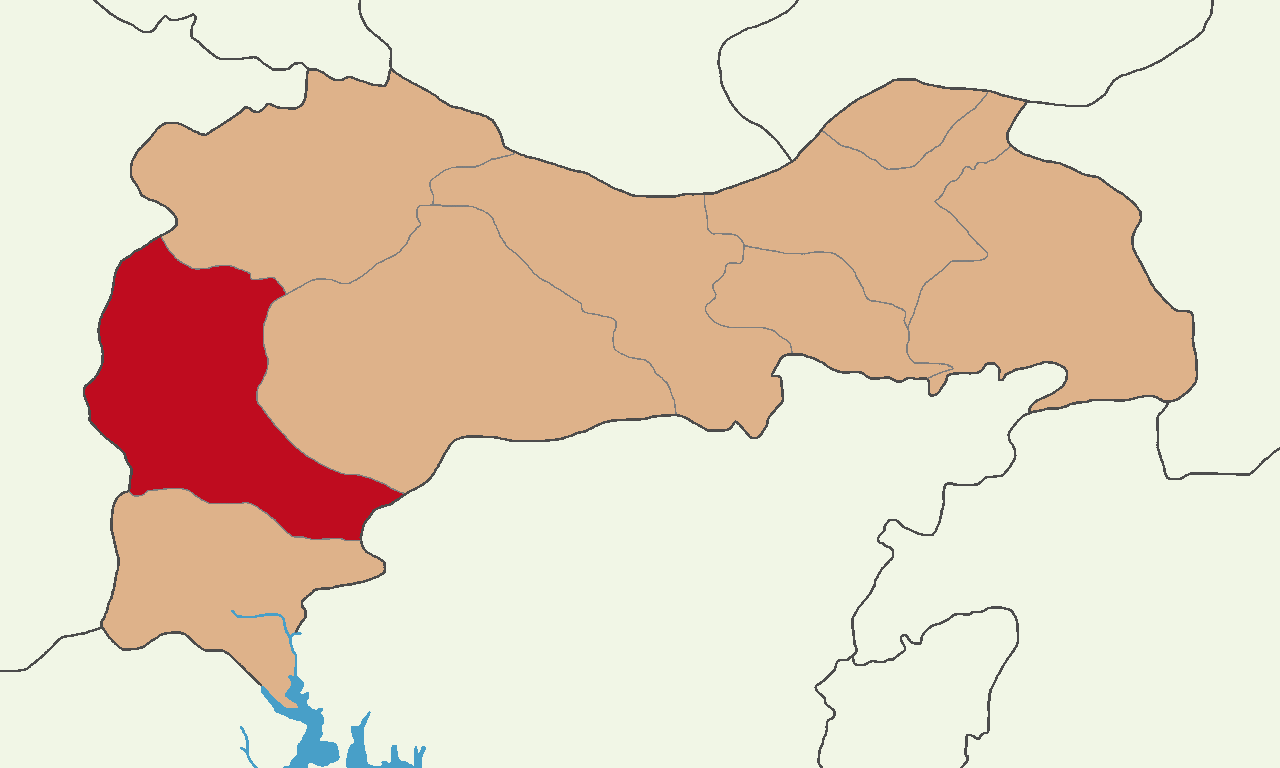
- Map showing İliç District in Erzincan Province

- Location in Turkey
- Coordinates: 39°27′N 38°34′E
- Country: Turkey
- Province: Erzincan
- Seat: İliç

Government
  - Kaymakam: Cüneyt Demirkol
- Area: 1,382 km^{2} (534 sq mi)
- Population (2022): 8,905
  - Density: 6.4/km^{2} (17/sq mi)
- Time zone: UTC+3 (TRT)
- Website: www.ilic.gov.tr

İliç District is a district of the Erzincan Province of Turkey. Its seat is the town of İliç. Its area is 1,382 km^{2}, and its population is 8,905 (2022).

== Composition ==
There is one municipality in İliç District:

- İliç

There are 58 villages in İliç District:

- Ağıldere
- Akçayazı
- Akdoğu
- Altıntaş
- Atma
- Bağcağız
- Bağıştaş
- Bağlıca
- Balkaya
- Boyalık
- Bozçalı
- Bozyayla
- Bürüncek
- Büyükarmutlu
- Büyükgümüşlü
- Büyükköy
- Çaltı
- Çaylı
- Çayyaka
- Çiftlikköy
- Çilesiz
- Çobanlı
- Çöpler
- Çörekli
- Dikmen
- Doğanköy
- Dolugün
- Doruksaray
- Dostal
- Güngören
- İslamköy
- Kapıkaya
- Karakaya
- Kayacık
- Kaymaklı
- Konukçu
- Kozluca
- Küçükarmutlu
- Küçükgümüşlü
- Kuranköy
- Kuruçay
- Kuzkışla
- Leventpınarı
- Ortatepe
- Özlü
- Sabırlı
- Sarıkonak
- Sarıpınar
- Sularbaşı
- Sütlüce
- Tabanlı
- Turgutlu
- Uğurköy
- Uluyamaç
- Yakuplu
- Yalıngöze
- Yaylapınar
- Yılmazköy
