= Çiftlikköy, İliç =

Village in Turkey

Çiftlikköy
- Village
- Location in Turkey
- Coordinates: 39°36′41″N 38°30′31″E
- Country: Turkey
- Province: Erzincan
- District: İliç
- Population (2022): 34
- Time zone: UTC+3 (TRT)

Çiftlikköy is a village in the İliç District of Erzincan Province in Turkey. Its population is 34 (2022).
