= Bademli, Ergani =

Village in Turkey

Bademli
- Neighbourhood
- Location in Turkey
- Coordinates: 38.2937°N 39.9369°E
- Country: Turkey
- Province: Diyarbakır
- District: Ergani
- Population (2022): 285
- Time zone: UTC+3 (TRT)

Bademli is a neighbourhood in the municipality and district of Ergani, Diyarbakır Province in Turkey. Its population is 285 (2022).
