= Ziyaret, Ergani =

Village in Turkey

Ziyaret
- Neighbourhood
- Location in Turkey
- Coordinates: 38.2016°N 39.6438°E
- Country: Turkey
- Province: Diyarbakır
- District: Ergani
- Population (2022): 664
- Time zone: UTC+3 (TRT)

Ziyaret is a neighbourhood in the municipality and district of Ergani, Diyarbakır Province in Turkey. Its population is 664 (2022).
