= Karaburçak, Ergani =

Village in Turkey

Karaburçak
- Neighbourhood
- Country: Turkey
- Province: Diyarbakır
- District: Ergani
- Population (2022): 692
- Time zone: UTC+3 (TRT)

Karaburçak is a neighbourhood in the municipality and district of Ergani, Diyarbakır Province in Turkey. Its population is 692 (2022).
