= Şölen, Ergani =

Village in Turkey

Şölen
- Neighbourhood
- Location in Turkey
- Coordinates: 38°17′N 39°54′E
- Country: Turkey
- Province: Diyarbakır
- District: Ergani
- Population (2022): 1,556
- Time zone: UTC+3 (TRT)

Şölen is a neighbourhood of the municipality and district of Ergani, Diyarbakır Province, Turkey. It is populated by Kurds of the Cemaldini tribe and had a population of 1,556 in 2022. Before the 2013 reorganisation, it was a town (belde).
