= Çayırdere, Ergani =

Village in Turkey

Çayırdere
- Neighbourhood
- Location in Turkey
- Coordinates: 38°13′12″N 39°34′26″E
- Country: Turkey
- Province: Diyarbakır
- District: Ergani
- Population (2022): 1,020
- Time zone: UTC+3 (TRT)

Çayırdere is a neighbourhood in the municipality and district of Ergani, Diyarbakır Province in Turkey. Its population is 1,020 (2022).
