= Sökündüzü, Ergani =

Village in Turkey

Sökündüzü
- Neighbourhood
- Location in Turkey
- Coordinates: 38°12′N 39°44′E
- Country: Turkey
- Province: Diyarbakır
- District: Ergani
- Population (2022): 195
- Time zone: UTC+3 (TRT)

Sökündüzü is a neighbourhood in the municipality and district of Ergani, Diyarbakır Province in Turkey. Its population is 195 (2022).
