= Kayacık, İliç =

Village in Turkey

Kayacık
- Village
- Location in Turkey
- Coordinates: 39.439°N 38.452°E
- Country: Turkey
- Province: Erzincan
- District: İliç
- Population (2022): 23
- Time zone: UTC+3 (TRT)

Kayacık is a village in the İliç District of Erzincan Province in Turkey. Its population is 23 (2022).
