= İncebayır, Alacakaya =

Village in Turkey

İncebayır
- Village
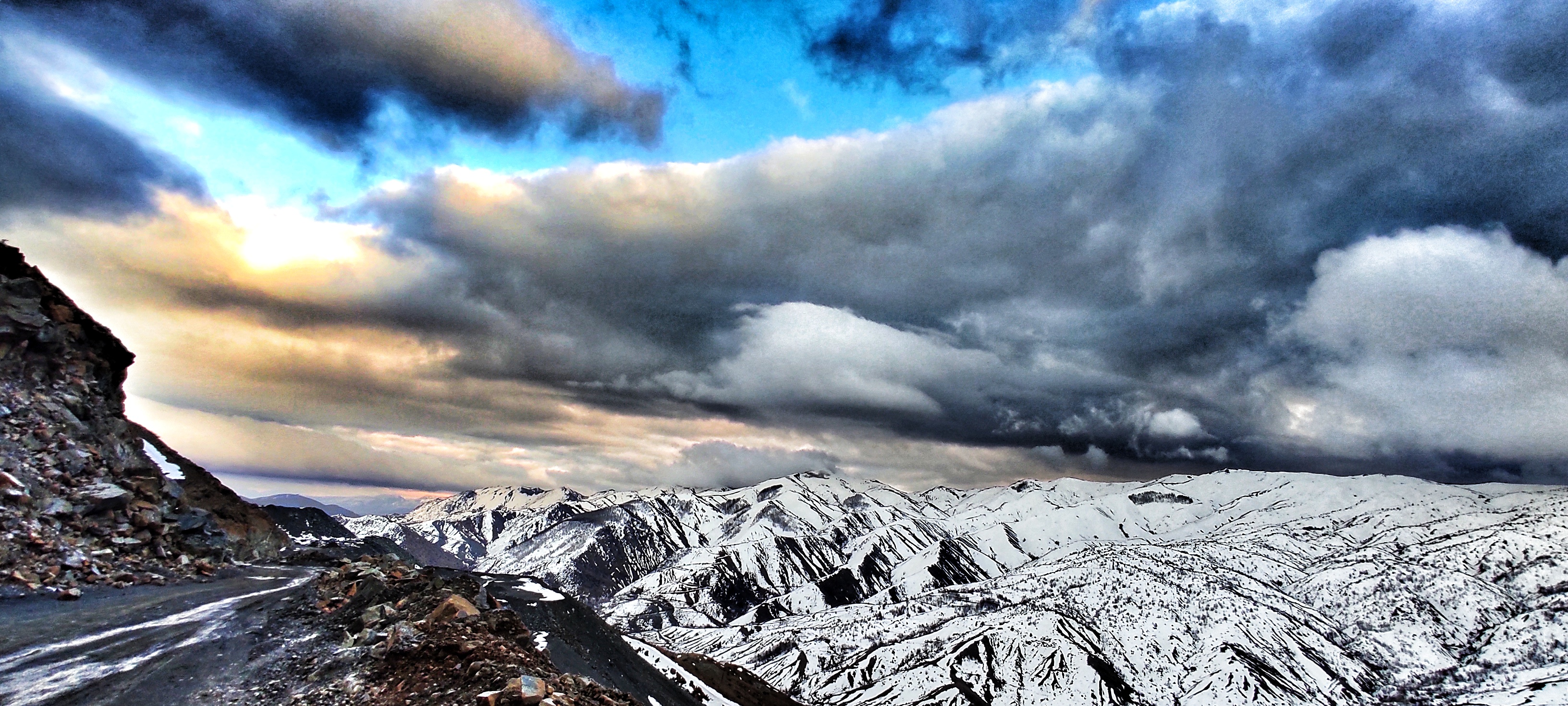
- open mine near İncebayır, Alacakaya

- Location within Turkey
- Coordinates: 38°29′N 39°45′E
- Country: Turkey
- Province: Elazığ
- District: Alacakaya
- Population (2021): 146
- Time zone: UTC+3 (TRT)

İncebayır is a village in the Alacakaya District of Elazığ Province in Turkey. Its population is 146 (2021). The village is populated by Kurds.
