= Akçayazı, İliç =

Village in Turkey

Akçayazı
- Village
- Location in Turkey
- Coordinates: 39.7107°N 38.4164°E
- Country: Turkey
- Province: Erzincan
- District: İliç
- Population (2022): 15
- Time zone: UTC+3 (TRT)

Akçayazı is a village in the İliç District of Erzincan Province in Turkey. Its population is 15 (2022).
