= Dostal =

Dostal (feminine: Dostalová) is a Czech surname. It is derived from the verb dostat and means '[he] received'. Dostal is also a germanised form of the surname Dostál. Notable people with the surname include:

- Frank Dostal (1945–2017), German musician
- Hana Dostalová (1890–1981), Czech illustrator
- Hermann Dostal (1874–1930), Austrian composer
- Karel Dostal (1884–1966), Czech actor
- Nico Dostal (1895–1981), Austrian composer
