= Yeşilköy, Ergani =

Village in Turkey

Yeşilköy
- Neighbourhood
- Country: Turkey
- Province: Diyarbakır
- District: Ergani
- Population (2022): 159
- Time zone: UTC+3 (TRT)

Yeşilköy is a neighbourhood in the municipality and district of Ergani, Diyarbakır Province in Turkey. Its population is 159 (2022).

The settlement's original name was Harbeto, derived from the Syriac word Hrbeto ('ruins').
