= Yukarıbitikçi, Ergani =

Village in Turkey

Yukarıbitikçi
- Neighbourhood
- Location in Turkey
- Coordinates: 37°57′N 39°40′E
- Country: Turkey
- Province: Diyarbakır
- District: Ergani
- Population (2022): 709
- Time zone: UTC+3 (TRT)

Yukarıbitikçi is a neighbourhood in the municipality and district of Ergani, Diyarbakır Province in Turkey. Its population is 709 (2022).
