= Bağıştaş 1 Dam =

- Location within Turkey
- Official name: Bağıştaş 1 Baraji ve HEPP
- Country: Turkey
- Location: Bağıştaş, İliç district, Erzincan Province
- Coordinates: 39°26′57.54″N 038°31′22.61″E
- Purpose: Power
- Status: Operational
- Construction began: 2011
- Opening date: 2015
- Owner: Ictas Enerji Uretim ve Ticaret AS

Dam and spillways
- Type of dam: Embankment
- Impounds: Karasu River
- Height: 50 m (160 ft)

Reservoir
- Catchment area: 15,587 km^{2} (6,018 mi^{2})

Power Station
- Commission date: 2015
- Type: Conventional
- Turbines: 3 x 44.7 MW, 1 x 6.3 MW Francis-type
- Installed capacity: 140.4 MW

The Bağıştaş 1 Dam is an embankment dam on the Karasu River near Bağıştaş in İliç district of Erzincan Province, eastern Turkey. The primary purpose of the dam is hydroelectric power generation and it supports a 140.4 MW power station. Construction began in 2011 and the generators were commissioned in 2015. It was officially dedicated by President Recep Tayyip Erdogan on 14 January 2016. The dam and power plant are owned and operated by Ictas Enerji Uretim ve Ticaret AS.

== See also ==
- Bağıştaş 2 Dam – downstream
