= Bozçalı, İliç =

Village in Turkey

Bozçalı
- Village
- Location in Turkey
- Coordinates: 39.7409°N 38.5981°E
- Country: Turkey
- Province: Erzincan
- District: İliç
- Population (2022): 59
- Time zone: UTC+3 (TRT)

Bozçalı is a village in the İliç District of Erzincan Province in Turkey. Its population is 59 (2022).
