= Büyükköy, İliç =

Village in Turkey

Büyükköy
- Village
- Location in Turkey
- Coordinates: 39.4737°N 38.6673°E
- Country: Turkey
- Province: Erzincan
- District: İliç
- Population (2022): 52
- Time zone: UTC+3 (TRT)

Büyükköy is a village in the İliç District of Erzincan Province in Turkey. Its population is 52 (2022).
