= Hilar, Ergani =

Village in Turkey

Hilar
- Neighbourhood
- Location in Turkey
- Coordinates: 38°13′N 39°43′E
- Country: Turkey
- Province: Diyarbakır
- District: Ergani
- Population (2022): 101
- Time zone: UTC+3 (TRT)

Hilar (formerly: Sesverenpınar) is a neighbourhood in the municipality and district of Ergani, Diyarbakır Province in Turkey. Its population is 101 (2022).
