= Kuranköy, İliç =

Village in Turkey

Kuranköy
- Village
- Location in Turkey
- Coordinates: 39°42′N 38°26′E
- Country: Turkey
- Province: Erzincan
- District: İliç
- Population (2022): 9
- Time zone: UTC+3 (TRT)

Kuranköy is a village in the İliç District of Erzincan Province in Turkey. Its population is 9 (2022).
