= Demirli, Ergani =

Village in Turkey

Demirli
- Neighbourhood
- Location in Turkey
- Coordinates: 37°52′0″N 39°44′25″E
- Country: Turkey
- Province: Diyarbakır
- District: Ergani
- Population (2022): 460
- Time zone: UTC+3 (TRT)

Demirli (Kurdish: Dimirlî) is a neighbourhood in the municipality and district of Ergani, Diyarbakır Province in Turkey. It is populated by Kurds of the Îzol tribe and had a population of 460 in 2022.
