= Konukçu, İliç =

Village in Turkey

Konukçu
- Village
- Location in Turkey
- Coordinates: 39.72°N 38.5847°E
- Country: Turkey
- Province: Erzincan
- District: İliç
- Population (2024): 70
- Time zone: UTC+3 (TRT)

Konukçu (former name: Bizgi) is a village in the İliç District of Erzincan Province in Turkey. The village had a population of 70 in 2024.
