= Bağlıca, İliç =

Village in Turkey

Bağlıca
- Village
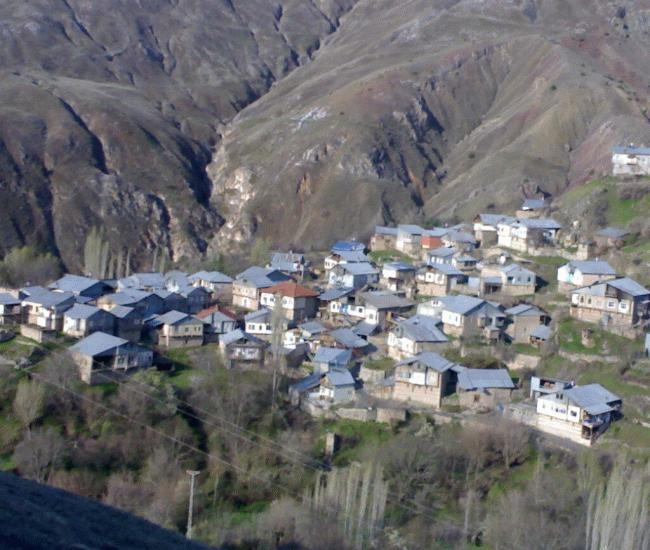

- Location within Turkey
- Coordinates: 39.4730°N 38.3887°E
- Country: Turkey
- Province: Erzincan
- District: İliç
- Population (2022): 72
- Time zone: UTC+3 (TRT)

Bağlıca (Kurdish: Zineker) is a village in the İliç District of Erzincan Province in Turkey. The village is populated by Kurds of the Abasan tribe and had a population of 72 in 2022.
