= Çakırfakır, Ergani =

Village in Turkey

Çakırfakır
- Neighbourhood
- Location in Turkey
- Coordinates: 38°09′N 39°39′E
- Country: Turkey
- Province: Diyarbakır
- District: Ergani
- Population (2022): 261
- Time zone: UTC+3 (TRT)

Çakırfakır is a neighbourhood in the municipality and district of Ergani, Diyarbakır Province in Turkey. Its population is 261 (2022).
