= Kuruçay, İliç =

Village in Turkey

Kuruçay
- Village
- Location in Turkey
- Coordinates: 39.639°N 38.474°E
- Country: Turkey
- Province: Erzincan
- District: İliç
- Population (2022): 79
- Time zone: UTC+3 (TRT)

Kuruçay is a village in the İliç District of Erzincan Province in Turkey. Its population is 79 (2022).
