= Altıntaş, İliç =

Village in Turkey

Altıntaş
- Village
- Location in Turkey
- Coordinates: 39.4722°N 38.3427°E
- Country: Turkey
- Province: Erzincan
- District: İliç
- Population (2022): 127
- Time zone: UTC+3 (TRT)

Altıntaş is a village in the İliç District of Erzincan Province in Turkey. Its population is 127 (2022).
