= Gülerce, Ergani =

Village in Turkey

Gülerce
- Neighbourhood
- Location in Turkey
- Coordinates: 38°09′N 39°50′E
- Country: Turkey
- Province: Diyarbakır
- District: Ergani
- Population (2022): 267
- Time zone: UTC+3 (TRT)

Gülerce is a neighbourhood in the municipality and district of Ergani, Diyarbakır Province in Turkey. Its population is 267 (2022).
