= Gökiçi, Ergani =

Village in Turkey

Gökiçi
- Neighbourhood
- Location in Turkey
- Coordinates: 38°03′40″N 39°42′30″E
- Country: Turkey
- Province: Diyarbakır
- District: Ergani
- Population (2022): 326
- Time zone: UTC+3 (TRT)

Gökiçi is a neighbourhood in the municipality and district of Ergani, Diyarbakır Province in Turkey. Its population is 326 (2022).
