= Olgun, Ergani =

Village in Turkey

Olgun
- Neighbourhood
- Location in Turkey
- Coordinates: 38°05′20″N 39°50′49″E
- Country: Turkey
- Province: Diyarbakır
- District: Ergani
- Population (2022): 1,075
- Time zone: UTC+3 (TRT)

Olgun (Kurdish: Tilki) is a neighbourhood in the municipality and district of Ergani, Diyarbakır Province in Turkey. It is populated by Kurds of the Cemaldini tribe and had a population of 1,075 in 2022.
