= Güzelyurt, Ergani =

Village in Turkey

Güzelyurt
- Neighbourhood
- Location in Turkey
- Coordinates: 38.175°N 39.8236°E
- Country: Turkey
- Province: Diyarbakır
- District: Ergani
- Population (2022): 211
- Time zone: UTC+3 (TRT)

Güzelyurt is a neighbourhood in the municipality and district of Ergani, Diyarbakır Province in Turkey. Its population is 211 (2022).
