= Gönye River =

River in Turkey

Gönye River (Gönye Çayı) is a river in Turkey that serves as a drinking water supply for the city of Erzincan. It cut by the Erzincan Dam. This river merges with the Western Euphrates south-west of Erzincan, 18 km south-east of the dam.
