= Üzümlü, Ergani =

Village in Turkey

Üzümlü
- Neighbourhood
- Location in Turkey
- Coordinates: 38.2102°N 39.9199°E
- Country: Turkey
- Province: Diyarbakır
- District: Ergani
- Population (2022): 153
- Time zone: UTC+3 (TRT)

Üzümlü is a neighbourhood in the municipality and district of Ergani, Diyarbakır Province in Turkey. Its population is 153 (2022).
