= Yalıngöze, İliç =

Village in Turkey

Yalıngöze
- Village
- Location in Turkey
- Coordinates: 39°37′N 38°26′E
- Country: Turkey
- Province: Erzincan
- District: İliç
- Population (2022): 27
- Time zone: UTC+3 (TRT)

Yalıngöze is a village in the İliç District of Erzincan Province in Turkey. Its population is 27 (2022).
