= Giraylar, Ergani =

Village in Turkey

Giraylar
- Neighbourhood
- Country: Turkey
- Province: Diyarbakır
- District: Ergani
- Population (2022): 372
- Time zone: UTC+3 (TRT)

Giraylar is a neighbourhood in the municipality and district of Ergani, Diyarbakır Province in Turkey. Its population is 372 (2022).
