= Yakuplu, İliç =

Village in Turkey

Yakuplu
- Village
- Location in Turkey
- Coordinates: 39.4252°N 38.5922°E
- Country: Turkey
- Province: Erzincan
- District: İliç
- Population (2022): 70
- Time zone: UTC+3 (TRT)

Yakuplu is a village in the İliç District of Erzincan Province in Turkey. Its population is 70 (2022).
