= Armutova, Ergani =

Village in Turkey

Armutova
- Neighbourhood
- Location in Turkey
- Coordinates: 38.2669°N 39.6065°E
- Country: Turkey
- Province: Diyarbakır
- District: Ergani
- Population (2022): 484
- Time zone: UTC+3 (TRT)

Armutova is a neighbourhood in the municipality and district of Ergani, Diyarbakır Province in Turkey. Its population is 484 (2022).
