= Çakartaş, Ergani =

Village in Turkey

Çakartaş
- Neighbourhood
- Location in Turkey
- Coordinates: 38°05′20″N 39°39′50″E
- Country: Turkey
- Province: Diyarbakır
- District: Ergani
- Population (2022): 515
- Time zone: UTC+3 (TRT)

Çakartaş is a neighbourhood in the municipality and district of Ergani, Diyarbakır Province in Turkey. Its population is 515 (2022).
