= Kavaklı, Ergani =

Village in Turkey

Kavaklı
- Neighbourhood
- Location in Turkey
- Coordinates: 37°53′13″N 39°40′27″E
- Country: Turkey
- Province: Diyarbakır
- District: Ergani
- Population (2022): 644
- Time zone: UTC+3 (TRT)

Kavaklı (Kurdish: Qawakli) is a neighbourhood in the municipality and district of Ergani, Diyarbakır Province in Turkey. It is populated by Kurds of the Îzol tribe and had a population of 644 in 2022.
