= Kavurmaküpü, Ergani =

Village in Turkey

Kavurmaküpü
- Neighbourhood
- Location in Turkey
- Coordinates: 38°19′N 39°45′E
- Country: Turkey
- Province: Diyarbakır
- District: Ergani
- Population (2022): 39
- Time zone: UTC+3 (TRT)

Kavurmaküpü is a neighbourhood in the municipality and district of Ergani, Diyarbakır Province in Turkey. Its population is 39 (2022).
