= Selmanköy, Ergani =

Village in Turkey

Selmanköy
- Neighbourhood
- Location in Turkey
- Coordinates: 38°09′00″N 39°41′35″E
- Country: Turkey
- Province: Diyarbakır
- District: Ergani
- Population (2022): 1,771
- Time zone: UTC+3 (TRT)

Selmanköy is a neighbourhood in the municipality and district of Ergani, Diyarbakır Province in Turkey. Its population is 1,771 (2022).
