= Halkalı, Alacakaya =

Village in Turkey

Halkalı
- Village
- Location in Turkey
- Coordinates: 38°31′55″N 39°54′40″E
- Country: Turkey
- Province: Elazığ
- District: Alacakaya
- Population (2021): 541
- Time zone: UTC+3 (TRT)

Halkalı is a village in the Alacakaya District of Elazığ Province in Turkey. Its population is 541 (2021). The village is populated by Kurds.
