= Tevekli, Ergani =

Village in Turkey

Tevekli
- Neighbourhood
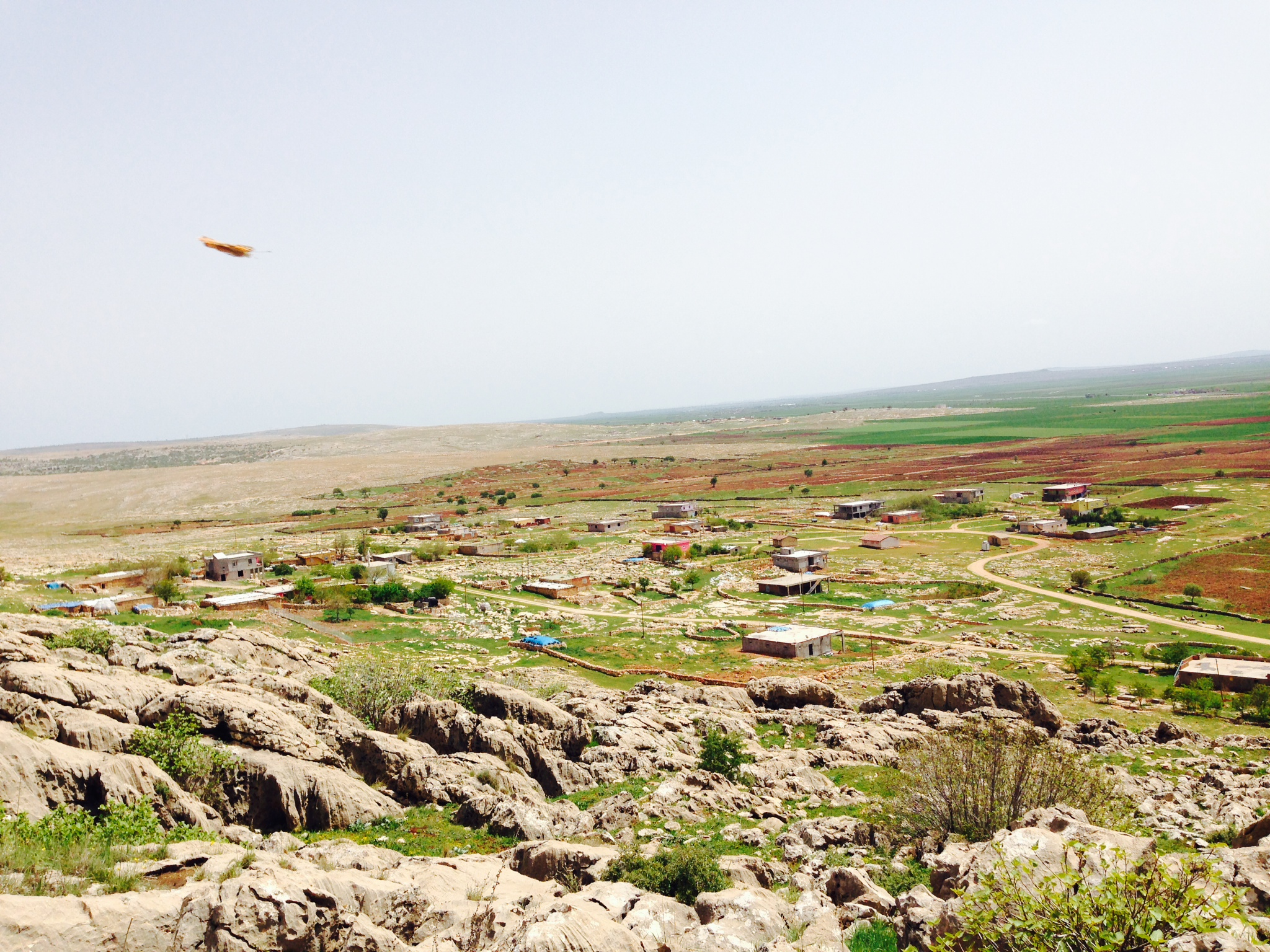

- Location within Turkey
- Country: Turkey
- Province: Diyarbakır
- District: Ergani
- Population (2022): 305
- Time zone: UTC+3 (TRT)

Tevekli is a neighbourhood in the municipality and district of Ergani, Diyarbakır Province in Turkey. Its population is 305 (2022).
