= Yalnızdamlar, Alacakaya =

Village in Turkey

Yalnızdamlar
- Village
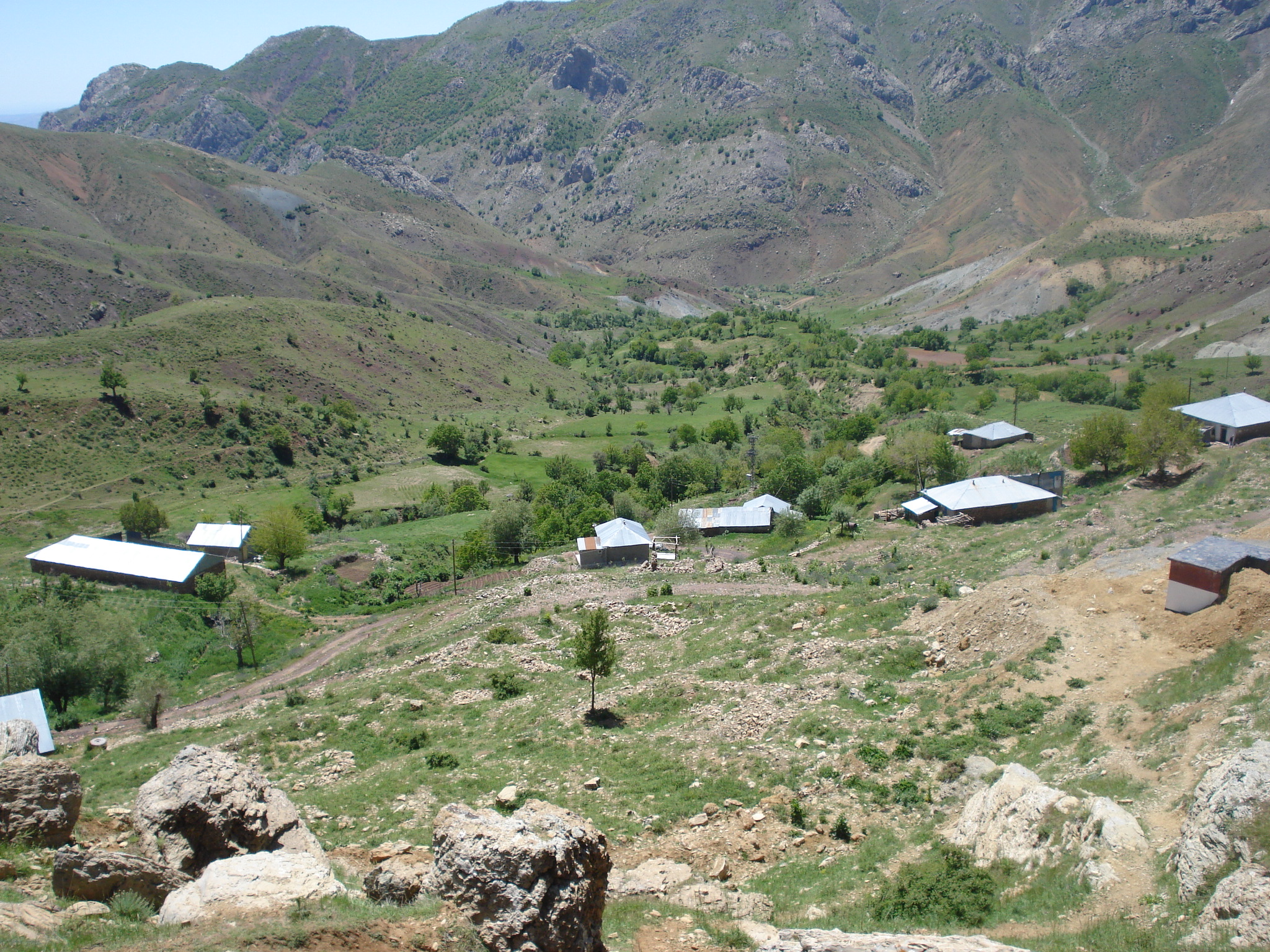
- Yalnızdamlar landscape

- Location within Turkey
- Coordinates: 38°32′N 39°59′E
- Country: Turkey
- Province: Elazığ
- District: Alacakaya
- Population (2021): 451
- Time zone: UTC+3 (TRT)

Yalnızdamlar is a village in the Alacakaya District of Elazığ Province in Turkey. Its population is 451 (2021). The village is populated by Kurds.
