= Yapraklı, Ergani =

Village in Turkey

Yapraklı
- Neighbourhood
- Country: Turkey
- Province: Diyarbakır
- District: Ergani
- Population (2022): 213
- Time zone: UTC+3 (TRT)

Yapraklı is a neighbourhood in the municipality and district of Ergani, Diyarbakır Province in Turkey. Its population is 213 (2022).
