= Uluyamaç, İliç =

Village in Turkey

Uluyamaç
- Village
- Location in Turkey
- Coordinates: 39°25′N 38°42′E
- Country: Turkey
- Province: Erzincan
- District: İliç
- Population (2022): 28
- Time zone: UTC+3 (TRT)

Uluyamaç is a village in the İliç District of Erzincan Province in Turkey. Its population is 28 (2022).
