= Tabanlı, İliç =

Village in Turkey

Tabanlı
- Village
- Location in Turkey
- Coordinates: 39.735°N 38.403°E
- Country: Turkey
- Province: Erzincan
- District: İliç
- Population (2022): 30
- Time zone: UTC+3 (TRT)

Tabanlı is a village in the İliç District of Erzincan Province in Turkey. Its population is 30 (2022).
