= Çukurdere, Ergani =

Village in Turkey

Çukurdere
- Neighbourhood
- Location in Turkey
- Coordinates: 38.328°N 39.808°E
- Country: Turkey
- Province: Diyarbakır
- District: Ergani
- Population (2022): 247
- Time zone: UTC+3 (TRT)

Çukurdere is a neighbourhood in the municipality and district of Ergani, Diyarbakır Province in Turkey. Its population is 247 (2022).
