= Bağıştaş, İliç =

Village in Turkey

Bağıştaş
- Village
- Location in Turkey
- Coordinates: 39°26′N 38°27′E
- Country: Turkey
- Province: Erzincan
- District: İliç
- Population (2022): 96
- Time zone: UTC+3 (TRT)

Bağıştaş is a village in the İliç District of Erzincan Province in Turkey. Its population is 96 (2022).
