= Sarıpınar, İliç =

Village in Turkey

Sarıpınar
- Village
- Location in Turkey
- Coordinates: 39.710°N 38.544°E
- Country: Turkey
- Province: Erzincan
- District: İliç
- Population (2022): 56
- Time zone: UTC+3 (TRT)

Sarıpınar is a village in the İliç District of Erzincan Province in Turkey. Its population is 56 (2022).
