= Çobanlı, İliç =

Village in Turkey

Çobanlı
- Village
- Location in Turkey
- Coordinates: 39°41′4″N 38°30′57″E
- Country: Turkey
- Province: Erzincan
- District: İliç
- Population (2022): 82
- Time zone: UTC+3 (TRT)

Çobanlı is a village in the İliç District of Erzincan Province in Turkey. Its population is 82 (2022).
