= Kaymaklı, İliç =

Village in Turkey

Kaymaklı
- Village
- Location in Turkey
- Coordinates: 39.397°N 38.785°E
- Country: Turkey
- Province: Erzincan
- District: İliç
- Population (2022): 17
- Time zone: UTC+3 (TRT)

Kaymaklı is a village in the İliç District of Erzincan Province in Turkey. As of 2022, its population was 17.
