= Çilesiz, İliç =

Village in Turkey

Çilesiz
- Village
- Location in Turkey
- Coordinates: 39°32′20″N 38°31′21″E
- Country: Turkey
- Province: Erzincan
- District: İliç
- Population (2022): 381
- Time zone: UTC+3 (TRT)

Çilesiz is a village in the İliç District of Erzincan Province in Turkey. Its population is 381 (2022).
