= Dibektaş, Ergani =

Village in Turkey

Dibektaş
- Neighbourhood
- Country: Turkey
- Province: Diyarbakır
- District: Ergani
- Population (2022): 578
- Time zone: UTC+3 (TRT)

Dibektaş is a neighbourhood in the municipality and district of Ergani, Diyarbakır Province in Turkey. Its population is 578 (2022). The village's original name was Zimayik. It is a Kurdish village.
