= Salihli, Ergani =

Village in Turkey

Salihli
- Neighbourhood
- Country: Turkey
- Province: Diyarbakır
- District: Ergani
- Population (2022): 872
- Time zone: UTC+3 (TRT)

Salihli is a neighbourhood in the municipality and district of Ergani, Diyarbakır Province in Turkey. Its population is 872 (2022).
