= Hançerli, Ergani =

Village in Turkey

Hançerli
- Neighbourhood
- Country: Turkey
- Province: Diyarbakır
- District: Ergani
- Population (2022): 327
- Time zone: UTC+3 (TRT)

Hançerli is a neighbourhood in the municipality and district of Ergani, Diyarbakır Province in Turkey. Its population was 327 in 2022.
