= Çakmakkaya mine =

Copper mine in Murgul, Artvin, Turkey

- Location within Turkey
- Location: Murgul, Artvin Province, Turkey; 41°14′51.4″N 41°34′54.19″E
- Products: Copper
- Opened: 1962
- Company: Etibank

The Çakmakkaya mine is a large mine in the east of Turkey in Artvin Province 465 km east of the capital, Ankara. Çakmakkaya represents one of the largest copper reserve in Turkey having estimated reserves of 100 million tonnes of ore grading 0.8% iron. The 100 million tonnes of ore contains 800,000 tonnes of copper metal.
