= Bozyayla, İliç =

Village in Turkey

Bozyayla
- Village
- Location in Turkey
- Coordinates: 39.5854°N 38.5629°E
- Country: Turkey
- Province: Erzincan
- District: İliç
- Population (2022): 85
- Time zone: UTC+3 (TRT)

Bozyayla is a village in the İliç District of Erzincan Province in Turkey. Its population is 85 (2022).
