= Çataklı, Alacakaya =

Village in Turkey

Çataklı
- Village
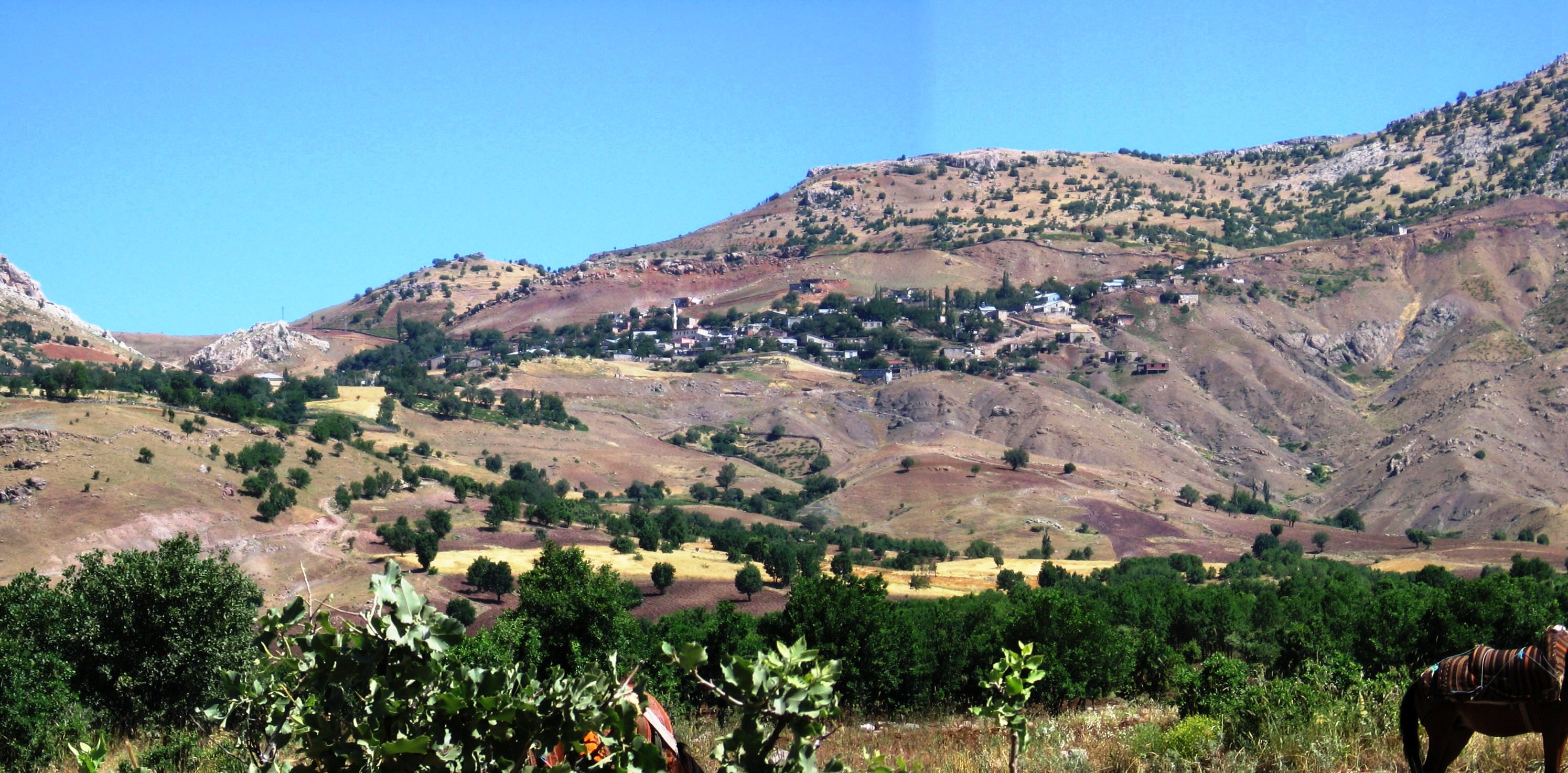

- Location within Turkey
- Coordinates: 38°23′46″N 39°51′16″E
- Country: Turkey
- Province: Elazığ
- District: Alacakaya
- Population (2021): 767
- Time zone: UTC+3 (TRT)

Çataklı is a village in the Alacakaya District of Elazığ Province in Turkey. Its population is 767 (2021). The village is populated by Kurds.
