= Güngören, İliç =

Village in Turkey

Güngören
- Village
- Location in Turkey
- Coordinates: 39.606°N 38.465°E
- Country: Turkey
- Province: Erzincan
- District: İliç
- Population (2022): 34
- Time zone: UTC+3 (TRT)

Güngören is a village in the İliç District of Erzincan Province in Turkey. Its population is 34 (2022).
