= Kuzkışla, İliç =

Village in Turkey

Kuzkışla
- Village
- Location in Turkey
- Coordinates: 39.698°N 38.610°E
- Country: Turkey
- Province: Erzincan
- District: İliç
- Population (2022): 49
- Time zone: UTC+3 (TRT)

Kuzkışla is a village in the İliç District of Erzincan Province in Turkey. Its population is 49 (2022).
