= Doğanköy, Ergani =

Village in Turkey

Doğanköy
- Neighbourhood
- Location in Turkey
- Coordinates: 38.007°N 39.819°E
- Country: Turkey
- Province: Diyarbakır
- District: Ergani
- Population (2022): 1,535
- Time zone: UTC+3 (TRT)

Doğanköy is a neighbourhood in the municipality and district of Ergani, Diyarbakır Province in Turkey. Its population is 1,535 (2022).
