= Gözlü, Ergani =

Village in Turkey

Gözlü
- Neighbourhood
- Country: Turkey
- Province: Diyarbakır
- District: Ergani
- Population (2022): 742
- Time zone: UTC+3 (TRT)

Gözlü is a neighbourhood in the municipality and district of Ergani, Diyarbakır Province in Turkey. Its population is 742 (2022).
