= Doğanköy, İliç =

Village in Turkey

Doğanköy
- Village
- Location in Turkey
- Coordinates: 39°27′10″N 38°38′8″E
- Country: Turkey
- Province: Erzincan
- District: İliç
- Population (2022): 21
- Time zone: UTC+3 (TRT)

Doğanköy is a village in the İliç District of Erzincan Province in Turkey. Its population is 21 (2022).
