= Ahmetli, Ergani =

Village in Turkey

Ahmetli
- Neighbourhood
- Location in Turkey
- Coordinates: 38.1801°N 39.8607°E
- Country: Turkey
- Province: Diyarbakır
- District: Ergani
- Population (2022): 2,061
- Time zone: UTC+3 (TRT)

Ahmetli is a neighbourhood in the municipality and district of Ergani, Diyarbakır Province in Turkey. Its population is 2,061 (2022).
