= Çayyaka, İliç =

Village in Turkey

Çayyaka
- Village
- Location in Turkey
- Coordinates: 39°37′26″N 38°32′33″E
- Country: Turkey
- Province: Erzincan
- District: İliç
- Population (2022): 117
- Time zone: UTC+3 (TRT)

Çayyaka is a village in the İliç District of Erzincan Province in Turkey. Its population is 117 (2022).
