= Sularbaşı, İliç =

Village in Turkey

Sularbaşı
- Village
- Location in Turkey
- Coordinates: 39.593°N 38.619°E
- Country: Turkey
- Province: Erzincan
- District: İliç
- Population (2022): 31
- Time zone: UTC+3 (TRT)

Sularbaşı is a village in the İliç District of Erzincan Province in Turkey. Its population is 31 (2022).
