= Çakmakkaya, Alacakaya =

Village in Turkey

Çakmakkaya
- Village
- Location in Turkey
- Coordinates: 38°30′N 39°53′E
- Country: Turkey
- Province: Elazığ
- District: Alacakaya
- Population (2021): 780
- Time zone: UTC+3 (TRT)

Çakmakkaya is a village in the Alacakaya District of Elazığ Province in Turkey. Its population is 780 (2021). The village is populated by Kurds.
