= Ortatepe, İliç =

Village in Turkey

Ortatepe
- Village
- Location in Turkey
- Coordinates: 39.411°N 38.429°E
- Country: Turkey
- Province: Erzincan
- District: İliç
- Population (2022): 37
- Time zone: UTC+3 (TRT)

Ortatepe is a village in the İliç District of Erzincan Province in Turkey. Its population is 37 (2022).
