= Uğurköy, İliç =

Village in Turkey

Uğurköy
- Village
- Location in Turkey
- Coordinates: 39.660°N 38.611°E
- Country: Turkey
- Province: Erzincan
- District: İliç
- Population (2022): 60
- Time zone: UTC+3 (TRT)

Uğurköy is a village in the İliç District of Erzincan Province in Turkey. Its population is 60 (2022).
