= Sabırlı, İliç =

Village in Turkey

Sabırlı
- Village
- Location in Turkey
- Coordinates: 39.419°N 38.565°E
- Country: Turkey
- Province: Erzincan
- District: İliç
- Population (2022): 492
- Time zone: UTC+3 (TRT)

Sabırlı is a village in the İliç District of Erzincan Province in Turkey. Its population is 492 (2022).
