= Özlü, İliç =

Village in Turkey

Özlü
- Village
- Location in Turkey
- Coordinates: 39.687°N 38.486°E
- Country: Turkey
- Province: Erzincan
- District: İliç
- Population (2022): 62
- Time zone: UTC+3 (TRT)

Özlü is a village in the İliç District of Erzincan Province in Turkey. Its population is 62 (2022).
