= Sabirli, Shamakhi =

Sabirli
- Municipality
- Location within Azerbaijan
- Coordinates: 40°33′17″N 48°36′48″E
- Country: Azerbaijan
- Rayon: Shamakhi

Population
  - Total: 380
- Time zone: UTC+4 (AZT)
  - Summer (DST): UTC+5 (AZT)

Sabirli is a village and municipality in the Shamakhi Rayon of Azerbaijan. It has a population of 380. Shamakhi is one of Azerbaijan’s most historic cities and the birthplace of legendary Azerbaijani poets such as Sabir and Nesimi.
