= Boncuklu, Ergani =

Village in Turkey

Boncuklu
- Neighbourhood
- Location in Turkey
- Coordinates: 38.2154°N 39.7524°E
- Country: Turkey
- Province: Diyarbakır
- District: Ergani
- Population (2022): 88
- Time zone: UTC+3 (TRT)

Boncuklu is a neighbourhood in the municipality and district of Ergani, Diyarbakır Province in Turkey. Its population is 88 (2022).
