= Bozyer, Ergani =

Village in Turkey

Bozyer
- Neighbourhood
- Location in Turkey
- Coordinates: 38.1842°N 39.7570°E
- Country: Turkey
- Province: Diyarbakır
- District: Ergani
- Population (2022): 602
- Time zone: UTC+3 (TRT)

Bozyer is a neighbourhood in the municipality and district of Ergani, Diyarbakır Province in Turkey. Its population is 602 (2022).
