= Dostal, İliç =

Village in Turkey

Dostal
- Village
- Location in Turkey
- Coordinates: 39°27′50″N 38°29′50″E
- Country: Turkey
- Province: Erzincan
- District: İliç
- Population (2022): 65
- Time zone: UTC+3 (TRT)

Dostal is a village in the İliç District of Erzincan Province in Turkey. Its population is 65 (2022).
