= Balkaya, İliç =

Village in Turkey

Balkaya
- Village
- Location in Turkey
- Coordinates: 39°42′07″N 38°38′03″E
- Country: Turkey
- Province: Erzincan
- District: İliç
- Population (2022): 72
- Time zone: UTC+3 (TRT)

Balkaya is a village in the İliç District of Erzincan Province in Turkey. Its population is 72 (2022).
