= Üçkardeş, Ergani =

Village in Turkey

Üçkardeş
- Neighbourhood
- Country: Turkey
- Province: Diyarbakır
- District: Ergani
- Population (2022): 180
- Time zone: UTC+3 (TRT)

Üçkardeş is a neighbourhood in the municipality and district of Ergani, Diyarbakır Province in Turkey. Its population is 180 (2022).
