= İliç =

İliç Lichk • Լիճք
- Municipality
- Location in Turkey
- Coordinates: 39°27′13″N 38°33′48″E
- Country: Turkey
- Province: Erzincan
- District: İliç

Government
  - Mayor: Mustafa Gürbüz (AKP)
- Elevation: 1,060 m (3,480 ft)
- Population (2022): 4,713
- Time zone: UTC+3 (TRT)
- Postal code: 24700
- Area code: 0446
- Website: www.ilic.bel.tr

İliç (Kurdish: Îlîç; Armenian: Լիճք, romanized: Lich) is a town in Erzincan Province in the Eastern Anatolia region of Turkey. It is the seat of İliç District. Its population is 4,713 (2022). Its elevation is 1,060 m. The mayor is Mustafa Gürbüz (AKP).

The town is just upstream of the Bağıştaş 1 Dam.

== Etymology ==
The name "İliç" comes from the towns former Armenian name "Լիճք" (Lichk), meaning lakes. It was called so because of the lakes formed from the water of overflowing springs.

== Notable people ==
- Hamdi Ulukaya, founder of food company Chobani, born here
- Mustafa Sarıgül writer, entrepreneur and politician.

== See also ==
- 2024 Çöpler Gold Mine disaster
