= Alacakaya =

- Municipality
- Location within Turkey
- Coordinates: 38°27′43″N 39°51′45″E
- Country: Turkey
- Province: Elazığ
- District: Alacakaya

Government
  - Mayor: Zafer Altınışık (YRP)
- Elevation: 1,150 m (3,770 ft)
- Population (2021): 2,451
- Time zone: UTC+3 (TRT)
- Postal code: 23410
- Climate: Csa
- Website: www.alacakaya.bel.tr

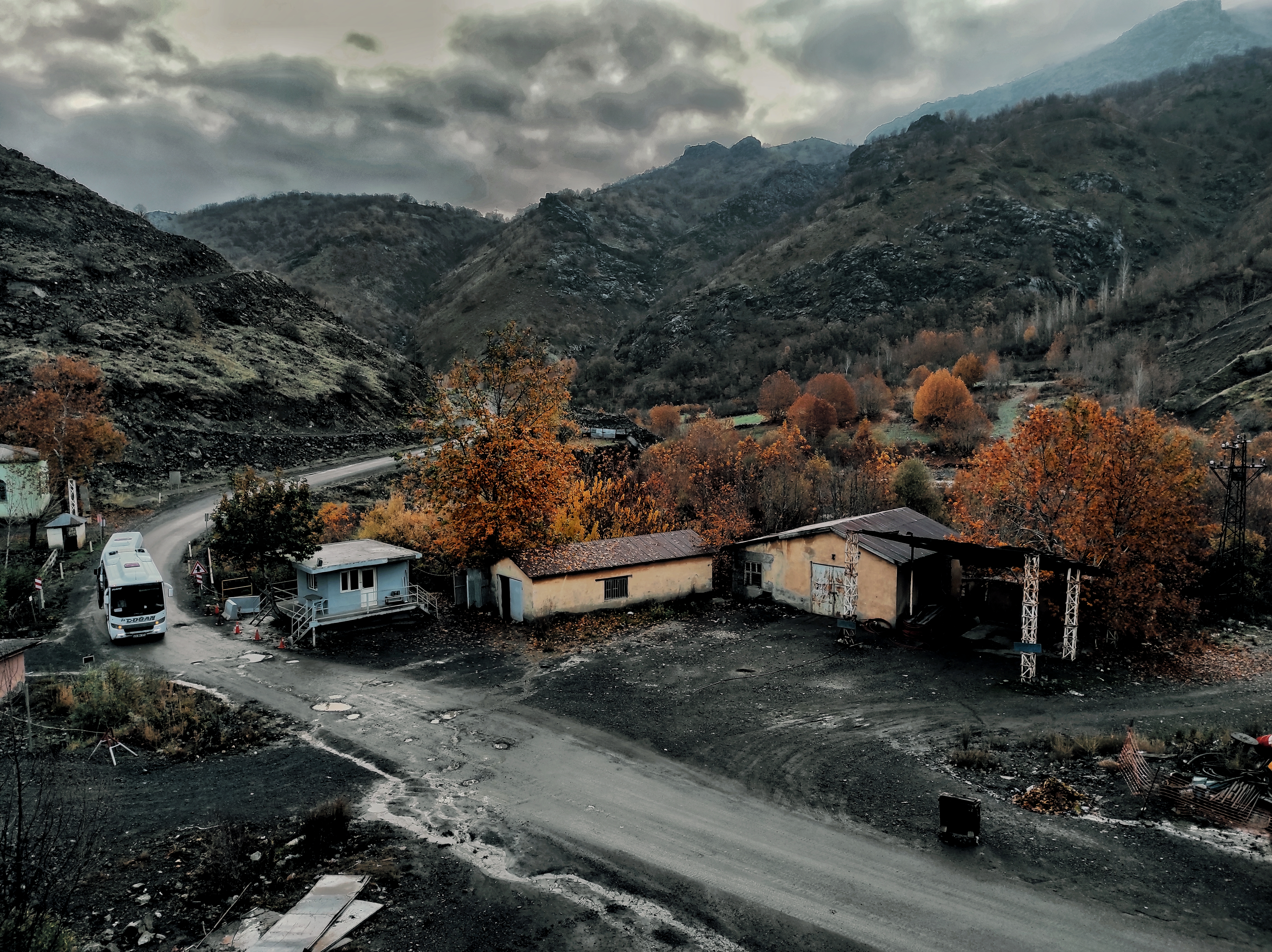
Alacakaya (Sori locality)

Alacakaya (Kurmanji Kurdish: Guleman, Zaza: Guleman) is a town of Elazığ Province of Turkey. It is the seat of Alacakaya District. Its population is 2,451 (2021). The mayor is Zafer Altınışık (YRP). The town is mostly populated by Zazas.

== Etymology ==
The former name, Guleman, originally meant "slaves" both in Kurmancî and Zaza language. The name in Turkish, Alacakaya, translates into "grey rock".

== History ==
The town had grown out of Guleman village in 1935, the year when Etibank founded a chromium ore processing plant near the town. The town was renamed as a result of place name changes in Turkey. With the chromium enterprise gradually growing and expanding, Alacakaya had grown and developed. The town was initially a village nominally under Maden. The town gained township (belde) rights on 30 December 1986. Alacakaya was granted district status with the Law no. 20523, published on 20 May 1990.

The renowned "cherry marble" is mined within the district boundaries and exported to various countries around the world.

== Neighbourhoods ==
The municipality consists of the following neighbourhoods:

- Altıncanak
- Altıoluk 38°26′16″N 39°53′01″E
- Güleman
- Gündoğdu
- Merkez
- Sularbaşı 38°29′47″N 39°50′40″E
