= Karasu (Euphrates) =

Tributary of Euphrates in Turkey

Coordinates: 38.8747°N 38.7939°E

The Karasu (Turkish for 'black water') or Western Euphrates is a long river in eastern Turkey, one of the two sources of the Euphrates. It has a length of about 450 km. To the ancient Greeks the river was known as the Telebóas (Τηλεβόας).

== Course ==
The river begins at the Dumlu Dağ in Erzurum Province, and drains the plains around the city of Erzurum. It is joined by the Serçeme River, then flows west through Erzincan Province, turning south, then west and receiving the tributary Tuzla Su. Between Erzincan and Kemah it is joined by the Gönye River and passes through a rocky gorge. Near the small town of Kemaliye it receives its last tributary, the Çaltı Çayı, before turning sharply southeast to flow through a deep canyon into the Keban Dam Lake on the Euphrates. Before construction of the Keban Dam the Karasu joined the Murat River 10 km above the dam site and 13 km above the town of Keban.

== History ==
It is thought likely that the river Harpasos mentioned by Xenophon in Anabasis 7.18 is the Kara Su, or the headwaters of the river Çoruh.

In 1996, 15 Turkish soldiers were killed when their personnel carrier fell into the river during a routine crossing.

When temperatures in Turkey dropped below -25 °C in 2005 the river froze over and was used as a football pitch by locals.
