= List of populated places in Erzincan Province =

Places in Turkey

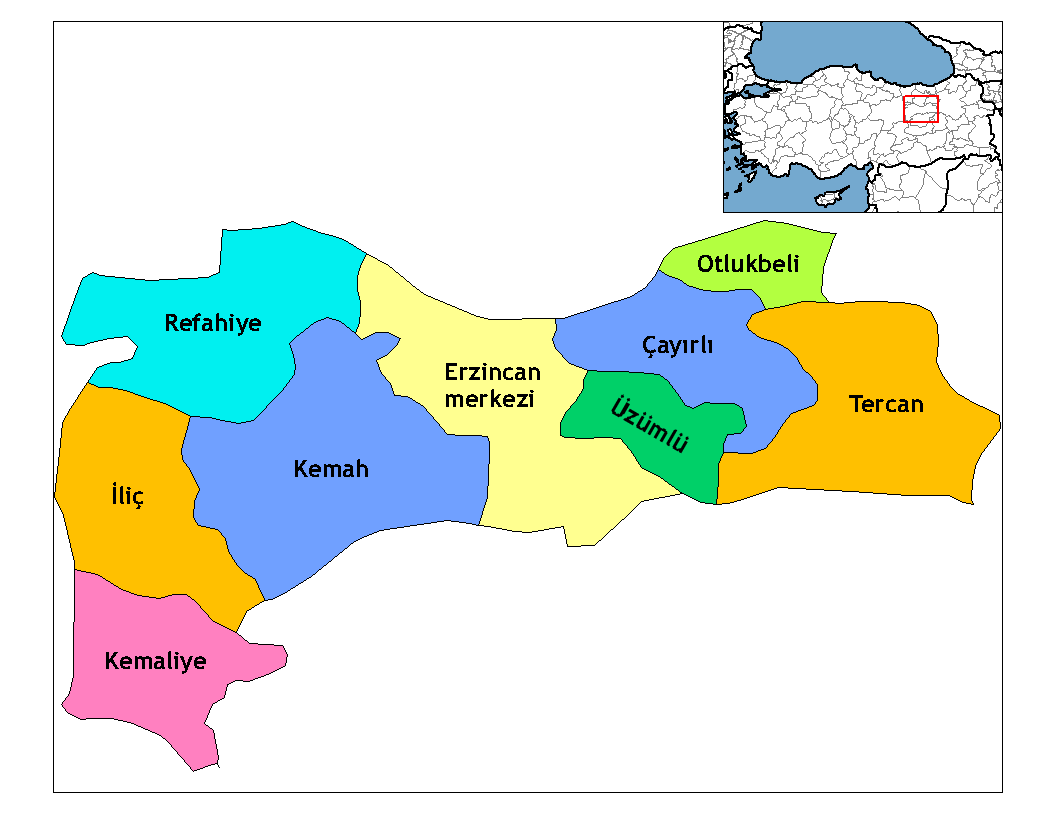
Erzincan Province

Below is the list of populated places in Erzincan Province, Turkey by the districts.

== Erzincan (Merkez) ==
- Çağlayan
- Erzincan
- Mollaköy
- Ağılözü
- Ahmetli
- Aydoğdu
- Bahçeliköy
- Bahçeyazı
- Baltaşı
- Balibey
- Ballı
- Beşsaray
- Binkoç
- Caferli
- Cevizli
- Çatalarmut
- Çatalören
- Çubuklu
- Değirmenköy
- Ekinci
- Ekmekli
- Elmaköy
- Ergan
- Ganiefendi Çiftliği
- Gölpınar
- Göyne
- Gümüştarla
- Günbağı
- Günebakan
- Gürlevik
- Hacıali Palangası
- Hancıçiftliği
- Hanidere
- Heybeli
- Ilıdere
- Kalecik
- Karadiğin
- Karatuş
- Kılıçkaya
- Kilimli
- Koçyatağı
- Konakbaşı
- Küçük Çakırman
- Mecidiye
- Oğlaktepe
- Ortayurt
- Pekmezli
- Pınarönü
- Sazlıpınar
- Saztepe
- Soğukoluk
- Söğütözü
- Sütpınar
- Tandırlı
- Tatlısu
- Türkmenoğlu
- Uluköy
- Ürek
- Yalınca
- Yeniköy
- Yeşilçat
- Yeşilçay

== Çayırlı ==
- Çayırlı
- Aşağıkartallı
- Balıklı
- Başköy
- Boybeyi
- Bozağa
- Bölükova
- Büyükgelengeç
- Büyük Yaylaköy
- Cennetpınar
- Coşan
- Çamurdere
- Çataksu
- Çaykent
- Çayönü
- Çilhoroz
- Çilligöl
- Doğanyuva
- Doluca
- Esendoruk
- Eşmepınar
- Gelinpınar
- Göller
- Harmantepe
- Hastarla
- Karataş
- Küçükgelengeç
- Mazlumağa
- Mirzaoğlu
- Oğultaşı
- Ortaçat
- Ozanlı
- Paşayurdu
- Pınarlı
- Saraycık
- Sarıgüney
- Saygılı
- Sırataş
- Toprakkale
- Tosunlar
- Turnaçayırı
- Verimli
- Yaylakent
- Yaylalar
- Yazıkaya
- Yeşilyaka
- Yukarıçamurdere
- Yukarıkartallı
- Yürekli

== İliç ==
- İliç
- Ağıldere
- Akçayazı
- Akdoğu
- Altıntaş
- Atma
- Bağcağız
- Bağıştaş
- Bağlıca
- Balkaya
- Boyalık
- Bozçalı
- Bozyayla
- Bürüncek
- Büyükarmutlu
- Büyükgümüşlü
- Büyükköy
- Çaltı
- Çaylı
- Çayyaka
- Çiftlikköy
- Çilesiz
- Çobanlı
- Çöpler
- Çörekli
- Dikmen
- Doğanköy
- Dolugün
- Doruksaray
- Dostal
- Güngören
- İslamköy
- Kapıkaya
- Karakaya
- Kayacık
- Kaymaklı
- Konukçu
- Kozluca
- Küçükarmutlu
- Küçükgümüşlü
- Kuranköy
- Kuruçay
- Kuzkışla
- Leventpınarı
- Ortatepe
- Özlü
- Sabırlı
- Sarıkonak
- Sarıpınar
- Sularbaşı
- Sütlüce
- Tabanlı
- Turgutlu
- Uğurköy
- Uluyamaç
- Yakuplu
- Yalıngöze
- Yaylapınar
- Yılmazköy

== Kemah ==
- Kemah
- Ağaçsaray
- Akbudak
- Akça
- Aktaş
- Akyünlü
- Alpköy
- Atma
- Ayranpınar
- Beşikli
- Boğaziçi
- Bozoğlak
- Çakırlar
- Çalgı
- Çalıklar
- Çamlıyayla
- Cevizlik
- Çiğdemli
- Dedek
- Dedeoğlu
- Dereköy
- Dikyamaç
- Doğanbeyli
- Doğanköy
- Doruca
- Dutlu
- Elmalı
- Eriç
- Esimli
- Eskibağlar
- Gediktepe
- Gökkaya
- Gölkaynak
- Gülbahçe
- Hakbilir
- Ilgarlı
- İncedere
- Karacaköy
- Karadağ
- Kardere
- Kayabaşı
- Kazankaya
- Kedek
- Kemeryaka
- Kerer
- Kırıkdere
- Koçkar
- Kömürköy
- Konuksever
- Koruyolu
- Küplü
- Kutluova
- Maksutuşağı
- Mermerli
- Mezraa
- Muratboynu
- Oğuzköy
- Olukpınar
- Özdamar
- Parmakkaya
- Şahintepe
- Sarıyazı
- Seringöze
- Sürekköy
- Tandırbaşı
- Tanköy
- Taşbulak
- Tuzla
- Uluçınar
- Yağca
- Yahşiler
- Yardere
- Yastıktepe
- Yücebelen

== Kemaliye ==
- Kemaliye
- Adak
- Ağıl
- Akçalı
- Aksöğüt
- Apçağa
- Armağan
- Arslanoba
- Aşağıumutlu
- Avcı
- Balkırı
- Başarı
- Başbağlar
- Başpınar
- Boylu
- Buğdaypınar
- Çakırtaş
- Çaldere
- Çanakçı
- Çat
- Çit
- Dallıca
- Demir
- Dilli
- Dolunay
- Dutluca
- Efeler
- Ergü
- Esence
- Gözaydın
- Güldibi
- Gümüşçeşme
- Günyolu
- Harmankaya
- Kabataş
- Karakoçlu
- Karapınar
- Kavacık
- Keklikpınarı
- Kışlacık
- Kocaçimen
- Kozlupınar
- Kuşak
- Kutluca
- Ocak
- Şahinler
- Salihli
- Sandık
- Sırakonak
- Subaşı
- Topkapı
- Toybelen
- Tuğlu
- Yaka
- Yayladamı
- Yazmakaya
- Yeşilyamaç
- Yeşilyayla
- Yeşilyurt
- Yıldızlı
- Yukarıumutlu
- Yuva

== Otlukbeli ==
- Otlukbeli
- Ağamçağam
- Avcıçayırı
- Boğazlı
- Karadivan
- Küçükotlukbeli
- Ördekhacı
- Söğütlü
- Umurlu
- Yeniköy
- Yeşilbük

== Refahiye ==
- Refahiye
- Ağmusa
- Akarsu
- Akbağ
- Akçiğdem
- Alacatlı
- Alaçayır
- Alapınar
- Altköy
- Ardıçlık
- Armutlu
- Arpayazı
- Aşağısütlü
- Aslanyusuf
- Aşut
- Avşarözü
- Aydıncık
- Aydoğan
- Babaaslan
- Bakacak
- Baloğlu
- Baştosun
- Biçer
- Bölüktepe
- Bostandere
- Çaltı
- Çamdibi
- Çamlımülk
- Çatak
- Çatalçam
- Çatköy
- Çavuşköy
- Cengerli
- Çiçekali
- Çıragediği
- Çukurçimen
- Çukuryazı
- Damlaca
- Derebaşı
- Diştaş
- Diyarlar
- Doğandere
- Dolaylı
- Ekecik
- Erecek
- Gazipınarı
- Gemecik
- Göçevi
- Gökseki
- Gölköy
- Gülensu
- Gümüşakar
- Günyüzü
- Güventepe
- Güzle
- Hacıköy
- Halitler
- Kabuller
- Kaçakköy
- Kadıköy
- Kalkancı
- Kamberağa
- Kandilköy
- Kanlıtaş
- Karasu
- Karayaprak
- Kayıköy
- Kazören
- Keçegöz
- Kersen
- Kırantepe
- Kırıktaş
- Kırkbulak
- Kızıleniş
- Koçkaya
- Konakköy
- Kürelik
- Kuzuluk
- Laleli
- Leventler
- Madendere
- Mendemebaşı
- Mendemeçukuru
- Merkez Kalkancı
- Muratçayırı
- Mülkköy
- Olgunlar
- Onurlu
- Ören
- Ortagöze
- Perçem
- Pınaryolu
- Resullar
- Sağlık
- Şahaloğlu
- Şahverdi
- Saipköy
- Salur
- Sarhan
- Sarıbayır
- Sarıkoç
- Sıralı
- Söğütlü
- Teknecik
- Tepeköy
- Topağaç
- Tülüköy
- Tuzluçayır
- Üçören
- Ulucak
- Uludere
- Yaylabeli
- Yaylapınar
- Yazıgediği
- Yazıköy
- Yeniköy
- Yeniyurt
- Yıldızören
- Yukarısütlü
- Yukarıyeniköy
- Yurtbaşı
- Yuvadağı

== Tercan ==
- Çadırkaya
- Kargın
- Mercan
- Tercan
- Ağören
- Aktaş
- Akyurt
- Altınkaya
- Armutluk
- Bağpınar
- Balyayla
- Başbudak
- Beğendik
- Beşgöze
- Beşkaya
- Beykonak
- Bulmuş
- Büklümdere
- Çalkışla
- Çatakdere
- Çayırdüzü
- Çukuryurt
- Dallıca
- Darıtepe
- Doluca
- Edebük
- Elaldı
- Elmalı
- Esenevler
- Fındıklı
- Gafurefendi
- Gedikdere
- Gevenlik
- Gökçe
- Gökdere
- Gökpınar
- Göktaş
- Güzbulak
- Hacıbayram
- Ilısu
- İkizler
- Kalecik
- Karacakışlak
- Karacaören
- Karahüseyin
- Kavaklık
- Kemerçam
- Kızılca
- Konarlı
- Köprübaşı
- Kurukol
- Kuzören
- Küçükağa
- Küllüce
- Mantarlı
- Mustafabey
- Müftüoğlu
- Oğulveren
- Ortaköy
- Sağlıca
- Sarıkaya
- Şengül
- Tepebaşı
- Topalhasan
- Üçpınar
- Yalınkaş
- Yamanlar
- Yastıkköy
- Yaylacık
- Yaylayolu
- Yaylım
- Yazıören
- Yenibucak
- Yeşilyayla
- Yuvalı

== Üzümlü ==
- Altınbaşak
- Üzümlü
- Avcılar
- Bağlar
- Balabanlı
- Bayırbağ
- Bulanık
- Büyükköy
- Çadırtepe
- Çamlıca
- Çardaklı
- Çayıryazı
- Demirpınar
- Denizdamı
- Derebük
- Esenyurt
- Göller
- Karacalar
- Karakaya
- Kureyşlisarıkaya
- Ocakbaşı
- Otluk
- Pelitli
- Pınarlıkaya
- Pişkidağ
