= Akbağ =

Akbağ can refer to:

- Demet Akbağ
- Akbağ, Refahiye
