= Yukarıyeniköy, Refahiye =

Village in Turkey

Yukarıyeniköy
- Village
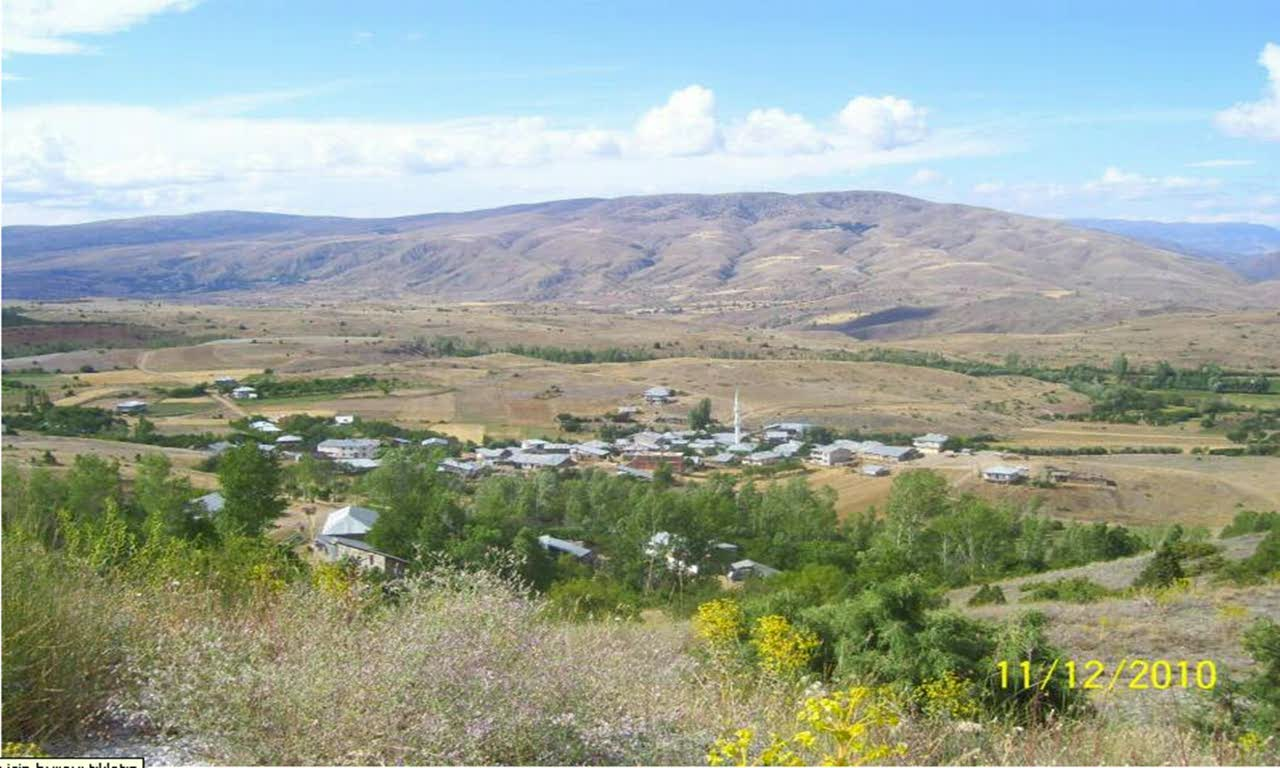

- Location within Turkey
- Coordinates: 39.993°N 38.745°E
- Country: Turkey
- Province: Erzincan
- District: Refahiye
- Population (2022): 100
- Time zone: UTC+3 (TRT)

Yukarıyeniköy is a village in the Refahiye District of Erzincan Province in Turkey. Its population is 100 (2022). It is populated by Turks.

The village, which was connected to the district of Suşehri in Sivas, is now connected to Refahiye, which is 15 kilometers away. Village people earn their living from agriculture and livestock. The majority of the village people work in various jobs in Istanbul. These people return to the village to spend their summer vacation.
