= Yeşilbük =

Yeşilbük may refer to the following places in Turkey:

- Yeşilbük, Otlukbeli, a village in the Otlukbeli District, Erzincan Province
- Yeşilbük, Şiran, a town in the Şiran District, Gümüşhane Province
