= Sağlık, Refahiye =

Village in Turkey

Sağlık
- Village
- Location in Turkey
- Coordinates: 39.917°N 38.772°E
- Country: Turkey
- Province: Erzincan
- District: Refahiye
- Population (2022): 100
- Time zone: UTC+3 (TRT)

Sağlık is a village in the Refahiye District of Erzincan Province in Turkey. The village is populated by Turks and had a population of 100 in 2022.

The village is 2km north of the town of Refahiye.
