= Umurlu =

Umurlu may refer to the following places in Turkey:

- Umurlu, Aydın
- Umurlu, Otlukbeli
- Umurlu, Sason
