= Kırkbulak, Refahiye =

Village in Turkey

Kırkbulak
- Village
- Location in Turkey
- Coordinates: 39.826°N 38.905°E
- Country: Turkey
- Province: Erzincan
- District: Refahiye
- Population (2022): 64
- Time zone: UTC+3 (TRT)

Kırkbulak, formerly Horopul, is a village in the Refahiye District of Erzincan Province in Turkey. The village is populated by Turks and had a population of 64 in 2022. The village is located 20km southeast of the town of Refahiye.

A large portion of the village has migrated to Istanbul.
