= Pınaryolu, Refahiye =

Village in Turkey

Pınaryolu
- Village
- Location in Turkey
- Coordinates: 39.867°N 38.742°E
- Country: Turkey
- Province: Erzincan
- District: Refahiye
- Population (2022): 160
- Time zone: UTC+3 (TRT)

Pınaryolu, formerly Divir, is a village in the Refahiye District of Erzincan Province in Turkey. The village is populated by Turks and had a population of 160 in 2022. The village is located 4km south of the town of Refahiye.

A large portion of the village has migrated to Refahiye, Erzincan and Istanbul.
