= Alaçayır, Refahiye =

Village in Turkey

Alaçayır
- Village
- Location in Turkey
- Coordinates: 39.8105°N 38.9328°E
- Country: Turkey
- Province: Erzincan
- District: Refahiye
- Population (2022): 88
- Time zone: UTC+3 (TRT)

Alaçayır, formerly known as Conur, is a village in the Refahiye District of Erzincan Province in Turkey. The village is populated by Turks and had a population of 88 in 2022.

== Notable people ==
- Suleyman Karaman
