= Olgunlar =

Olgunlar can refer to:

- Olgunlar, Adıyaman
- Olgunlar, Refahiye
