= Göçevi, Refahiye =

Village in Turkey

Köçevi
- Village
- Location within Turkey
- Coordinates: 39°47′34″N 38°59′01″E
- Country: Turkey
- Province: Erzincan
- District: Refahiye
- Elevation: 1,574 m (5,164 ft)
- Population (2022): 34
- Time zone: UTC+3 (TRT)
- Postal code: 24302
- Area code: 0446

Göçevi or Koçevi is a village in the Refahiye district of Erzincan Province, Turkey. The village had a population of 34 in 2022.

== History ==
According to a census taken in 1896 to determine the male population, the village of Koçovi — inhabited solely by Muslims and attached to the Gülensu nahiye — had 53 men across 16 households.

== Geography ==
The village is 99 km from the provincial centre of Erzincan and 30 km from the district centre of Refahiye. The village lies within the boundaries of the Eastern Anatolia Region.
