= Günyüzü, Refahiye =

Village in Turkey

Günyüzü
- Village
- Location in Turkey
- Coordinates: 39.878°N 38.749°E
- Country: Turkey
- Province: Erzincan
- District: Refahiye
- Population (2022): 53
- Time zone: UTC+3 (TRT)

Günyüzü, formerly Gercanis, is a village in the Refahiye District of Erzincan Province in Turkey. The village is populated by Turks and had a population of 53 in 2022. The village is located 3km south of the town of Refahiye.

A large portion of the village has migrated to Ankara and Istanbul.
