= Armutlu, Refahiye =

Village in Turkey

Armutlu
- Village
- Location in Turkey
- Coordinates: 39.9791°N 38.9347°E
- Country: Turkey
- Province: Erzincan
- District: Refahiye
- Population (2022): 18
- Time zone: UTC+3 (TRT)

Armutlu is a village in the Refahiye District of Erzincan Province in Turkey. The village is populated by Kurds of the Şadiyan tribe and had a population of 18 in 2022.
