= Kızıleniş, Refahiye =

Village in Turkey

Kızıleniş
- Village
- Location in Turkey
- Coordinates: 39.929°N 39.045°E
- Country: Turkey
- Province: Erzincan
- District: Refahiye
- Population (2022): 49
- Time zone: UTC+3 (TRT)

Kızıleniş (also: Kızıliniş) is a village in the Refahiye District of Erzincan Province in Turkey. The village is populated by Kurds of the Şadiyan tribe and had a population of 49 in 2022. The hamlet of Tosunlu is attached to the village.
