= Ortagöze, Refahiye =

Village in Turkey

Ortagöze
- Village
- Location in Turkey
- Coordinates: 39°58′N 38°38′E
- Country: Turkey
- Province: Erzincan
- District: Refahiye
- Population (2022): 91
- Time zone: UTC+3 (TRT)

Ortagöze, formerly Badırık, is a village in the Refahiye District of Erzincan Province in Turkey. The village is populated by Turks and had a population of 91 in 2022.
