= Merkez Kalkancı, Refahiye =

Village in Turkey

Merkez Kalkancı
- Village
- Location in Turkey
- Coordinates: 39°53′19″N 38°47′14″E
- Country: Turkey
- Province: Erzincan
- District: Refahiye
- Population (2022): 85
- Time zone: UTC+3 (TRT)

Merkez Kalkancı is a village in the Refahiye District of Erzincan Province in Turkey. The village is populated by Turks and had a population of 85 in 2022.
