= Yaylabeli, Refahiye =

Village in Turkey

Yaylabeli
- Village
- Location in Turkey
- Coordinates: 39.958°N 38.941°E
- Country: Turkey
- Province: Erzincan
- District: Refahiye
- Population (2022): 39
- Time zone: UTC+3 (TRT)

Yaylabeli (Kurdish: Lorut) is a village in the Refahiye District of Erzincan Province in Turkey. The village is populated by Kurds of the Pilvenk tribe and had a population of 39 in 2022.
