= Bakacak, Refahiye =

Village in Turkey

Bakacak
- Village
- Location in Turkey
- Coordinates: 39.9731°N 38.9641°E
- Country: Turkey
- Province: Erzincan
- District: Refahiye
- Population (2022): 27
- Time zone: UTC+3 (TRT)

Bakacak is a village in the Refahiye District of Erzincan Province in Turkey. Its population is 27 (2022).
