= Onurlu, Refahiye =

Village in Turkey

Onurlu
- Village
- Location in Turkey
- Coordinates: 39.834°N 38.784°E
- Country: Turkey
- Province: Erzincan
- District: Refahiye
- Population (2022): 21
- Time zone: UTC+3 (TRT)

Onurlu (Kurdish: Hanperi) is a village in the Refahiye District of Erzincan Province in Turkey. The village is populated by Kurds of the Şadiyan tribe and had a population of 21 in 2022.
