= Dolaylı, Refahiye =

Village in Turkey

Dolaylı
- Village
- Location in Turkey
- Coordinates: 39.984°N 38.802°E
- Country: Turkey
- Province: Erzincan
- District: Refahiye
- Population (2022): 80
- Time zone: UTC+3 (TRT)

Dolaylı, formerly Mondulas, is a village in the Refahiye District of Erzincan Province in Turkey. The village is populated by Georgians and Turks and had a population of 80 in 2022.
