= Çatalçam, Refahiye =

Village in Turkey

Çatalçam
- Village
- Location in Turkey
- Coordinates: 39.982°N 38.849°E
- Country: Turkey
- Province: Erzincan
- District: Refahiye
- Population (2022): 106
- Time zone: UTC+3 (TRT)

Çatalçam, formerly Zevker, is a village in the Refahiye District of Erzincan Province in Turkey. The village is populated by Turks and had a population of 106 in 2022.
