= Ördekhacı, Otlukbeli =

Village in Turkey

Ördekhacı
- Village
- Location in Turkey
- Coordinates: 40°02′N 40°10′E
- Country: Turkey
- Province: Erzincan
- District: Otlukbeli
- Population (2022): 21
- Time zone: UTC+3 (TRT)

Ördekhacı is a village in the Otlukbeli District of Erzincan Province in Turkey. Its population is 21 (2022). It is an Alevi Turk settlement.
