= Damlaca, Refahiye =

Village in Turkey

Damlaca
- Village
- Location in Turkey
- Coordinates: 39.992°N 38.764°E
- Country: Turkey
- Province: Erzincan
- District: Refahiye
- Population (2022): 66
- Time zone: UTC+3 (TRT)

Damlaca, formerly Buğdaçar, is a village in the Refahiye District of Erzincan Province in Turkey. The village is populated by Turks and had a population of 66 in 2022.
