= Yeniköy, Refahiye =

Village in Turkey

Yeniköy
- Village
- Location in Turkey
- Coordinates: 39.890°N 39.034°E
- Country: Turkey
- Province: Erzincan
- District: Refahiye
- Population (2022): 28
- Time zone: UTC+3 (TRT)

Yeniköy is a village in the Refahiye District of Erzincan Province in Turkey. The village is populated by Kurds of the Şadiyan tribe and had a population of 28 in 2022.
