= Teknecik, Refahiye =

Village in Turkey

Teknecik
- Village
- Location in Turkey
- Coordinates: 39.9122°N 38.8708°E
- Country: Turkey
- Province: Erzincan
- District: Refahiye
- Population (2022): 142
- Time zone: UTC+3 (TRT)

Teknecik, formerly Hanzar, is a village in the Refahiye District of Erzincan Province in Turkey. The village is populated by Turks and had a population of 14 in 2022.
