= Saipköy, Refahiye =

Village in Turkey

Saipköy
- Village
- Location in Turkey
- Coordinates: 39°56′N 38°36′E
- Country: Turkey
- Province: Erzincan
- District: Refahiye
- Population (2022): 30
- Time zone: UTC+3 (TRT)

Saipköy (also: Saip, Şaip) is a village in the Refahiye District of Erzincan Province in Turkey. The village is populated by Turks and had a population of 30 in 2022.
