= Tepeköy, Refahiye =

Village in Turkey

Tepeköy
- Village
- Location in Turkey
- Coordinates: 39.968°N 39.013°E
- Country: Turkey
- Province: Erzincan
- District: Refahiye
- Population (2022): 32
- Time zone: UTC+3 (TRT)

Tepeköy is a village in the Refahiye District of Erzincan Province in Turkey. The village is populated by Kurds of the Şadiyan tribe and had a population of 32 in 2022.
