= Çatak, Refahiye =

Village in Turkey

Çatak
- Village
- Location in Turkey
- Coordinates: 40.0172°N 38.8838°E
- Country: Turkey
- Province: Erzincan
- District: Refahiye
- Population (2022): 49
- Time zone: UTC+3 (TRT)

Çatak is a village in the Refahiye District of Erzincan Province in Turkey. Its population is 49 (2022).
