= Gökseki, Refahiye =

Village in Turkey

Gökseki
- Village
- Location in Turkey
- Coordinates: 40.018°N 38.862°E
- Country: Turkey
- Province: Erzincan
- District: Refahiye
- Population (2022): 92
- Time zone: UTC+3 (TRT)

Gökseki is a village in the Refahiye District of Erzincan Province in Turkey. The village is populated by Turks and had a population of 92 in 2022.
