= Derebaşı, Refahiye =

Village in Turkey

Derebaşı
- Village
- Location in Turkey
- Coordinates: 39.790°N 38.787°E
- Country: Turkey
- Province: Erzincan
- District: Refahiye
- Population (2022): 25
- Time zone: UTC+3 (TRT)

Derebaşı is a village in the Refahiye District of Erzincan Province in Turkey. The village is populated by Kurds of the Şadiyan tribe and had a population of 25 in 2022.
