= Mülkköy, Refahiye =

Village in Turkey

Mülkköy
- Village
- Location in Turkey
- Coordinates: 39.807°N 38.853°E
- Country: Turkey
- Province: Erzincan
- District: Refahiye
- Population (2022): 13
- Time zone: UTC+3 (TRT)

Mülkköy is a village in the Refahiye District of Erzincan Province in Turkey. The village is populated by Turks and had a population of 13 in 2022.
