= Çamlımülk, Refahiye =

Village in Turkey

Çamlımülk
- Village
- Location in Turkey
- Coordinates: 39.962°N 39.005°E
- Country: Turkey
- Province: Erzincan
- District: Refahiye
- Population (2022): 59
- Time zone: UTC+3 (TRT)

Çamlımülk is a village in the Refahiye District of Erzincan Province in Turkey. The village is populated by Kurds of the Şadiyan tribe and had a population of 59 in 2022.
