= Laleli, Refahiye =

Village in Turkey

Laleli
- Village
- Location within Turkey
- Coordinates: 39.798°N 38.963°E
- Country: Turkey
- Province: Erzincan
- District: Refahiye
- Population (2022): 29
- Time zone: UTC+3 (TRT)

Laleli is a village of the Refahiye District of Erzincan Province in the Eastern Anatolia region of Turkey. The village is populated by Turks and had a population of 29 in 2022.

== Name ==
The word "lale" means "tulip" in Turkish. The suffix "-li" has various meanings, including "with", "has", and "by". Accordingly, the word "Laleli" could be translated into English as "full of tulips".
