= Ören, Refahiye =

Village in Turkey

Ören
- Village
- Location in Turkey
- Coordinates: 40.031°N 38.899°E
- Country: Turkey
- Province: Erzincan
- District: Refahiye
- Population (2022): 24
- Time zone: UTC+3 (TRT)

Ören, formerly Haraba, is a village in the Refahiye District of Erzincan Province in Turkey. The village is populated by Georgians and Turks and had a population of 24 in 2022.

It is a former Greek village.
