= Aşağısütlü, Refahiye =

Village in Turkey

Aşağısütlü
- Village
- Location in Turkey
- Coordinates: 40°01′N 38°48′E
- Country: Turkey
- Province: Erzincan
- District: Refahiye
- Population (2022): 72
- Time zone: UTC+3 (TRT)

Aşağısütlü, formerly known as Gölüksür, is a village in the Refahiye District of Erzincan Province in Turkey. The village is populated by Georgians and Turks and had a population of 72 in 2022.

Georgian refugees settled in the village during the Russo-Turkish War in 1877-1878.
