= Küçükotlukbeli, Otlukbeli =

Village in Erzincan Province, Turkey

Küçükotlukbeli
- Village
- Location within Turkey
- Coordinates: 40.020°N 39.984°E
- Country: Turkey
- Province: Erzincan
- District: Otlukbeli
- Population (2021): 51
- Time zone: UTC+3 (TRT)

Küçükotlukbeli is a village in the Otlukbeli District, Erzincan Province, Turkey. It had a population of 51 in 2021.
