= Baloğlu, Refahiye =

Village in Turkey

Baloğlu
- Village
- Location in Turkey
- Coordinates: 39.9850°N 38.9604°E
- Country: Turkey
- Province: Erzincan
- District: Refahiye
- Population (2022): 29
- Time zone: UTC+3 (TRT)

Baloğlu, formerly known as Kutbaloğlu, is a village in the Refahiye District of Erzincan Province in Turkey. The village is populated by Turks and had a population of 29 in 2022.

== History ==
The village was severely damaged by the 1939 Erzincan earthquake.
