= Akçiğdem, Refahiye =

Village in Turkey

Akçiğdem
- Village
- Location in Turkey
- Coordinates: 39°56′N 38°50′E
- Country: Turkey
- Province: Erzincan
- District: Refahiye
- Population (2022): 41
- Time zone: UTC+3 (TRT)

Akçiğdem, formerly known as Horon, is a village in the Refahiye District of Erzincan Province in Turkey. The village is populated by Georgians and Turks and had a population of 41 in 2022.

Georgian refugees settled in the village during the Russo-Turkish War in 1877-1878.
