= Koçkaya, Refahiye =

Village in Turkey

Koçkaya
- Village
- Location in Turkey
- Coordinates: 39.759°N 38.661°E
- Country: Turkey
- Province: Erzincan
- District: Refahiye
- Population (2022): 38
- Time zone: UTC+3 (TRT)

Koçkaya, formerly known as Mezrahan, is a village in the Refahiye District of Erzincan Province in Turkey. The village is populated by Kurds of the Koçgiri and Şadiyan tribes and had a population of 38 in 2022.
