= Avcıçayırı, Otlukbeli =

Village in Erzincan Province, Turkey

Avcıçayırı
- Village
- Location within Turkey
- Coordinates: 39.975°N 39.879°E
- Country: Turkey
- Province: Erzincan
- District: Otlukbeli
- Population (2021): 60
- Time zone: UTC+3 (TRT)

Avcıçayırı (Kurdish: Mîskah) is a village in the Otlukbeli District, Erzincan Province, Turkey. The village is populated by Kurds of the Lolan tribe and had a population of 60 in 2021.
