= Alacatlı, Refahiye =

Village in Turkey

Alacatlı
- Village
- Location in Turkey
- Coordinates: 39.8943°N 38.8938°E
- Country: Turkey
- Province: Erzincan
- District: Refahiye
- Population (2022): 67
- Time zone: UTC+3 (TRT)

Alacatlı (also: Alacaatlı) is a village in the Refahiye District of Erzincan Province in Turkey. The village is populated by Turks and had a population of 67 in 2022.
