= Güzle, Refahiye =

Village in Turkey

Güzle
- Village
- Location in Turkey
- Coordinates: 39.7897°N 38.5436°E
- Country: Turkey
- Province: Erzincan
- District: Refahiye
- Population (2022): 10
- Time zone: UTC+3 (TRT)

Güzle is a village in the Refahiye District of Erzincan Province in Turkey. The village is populated by Kurds of the Koçgiri tribe and had a population of 10 in 2022.
