= Sarhan, Refahiye =

Village in Turkey

Sarhan
- Village
- Location in Turkey
- Coordinates: 39.930°N 38.563°E
- Country: Turkey
- Province: Erzincan
- District: Refahiye
- Population (2022): 23
- Time zone: UTC+3 (TRT)

Sarhan is a village in the Refahiye District of Erzincan Province in Turkey. The village is populated by Turks and had a population of 23 in 2022.

== History ==
The village has carried the same name since 1916.

The first written records about the village are found in the 1642 Avârız registers. At that time, in the settlement referred to as "Saruhan (İlgazi)" in the Dignasor district of the Gercanis subprovince in the Erzurum Province, there were 3 Muslim households listed as part of the avârız.
