= Alapınar, Refahiye =

Village in Turkey

Alapınar
- Village
- Location in Turkey
- Coordinates: 40.0025°N 38.8212°E
- Country: Turkey
- Province: Erzincan
- District: Refahiye
- Population (2022): 84
- Time zone: UTC+3 (TRT)

Alapınar, formerly known as Ofuz, is a village in the Refahiye District of Erzincan Province in Turkey. The village is populated by Turks and had a population of 84 in 2022.

== History ==
The village was severely damaged during the 1939 Erzincan earthquake.
