= Baştosun, Refahiye =

Village in Turkey

Baştosun
- Village
- Location in Turkey
- Coordinates: 39.970°N 38.926°E
- Country: Turkey
- Province: Erzincan
- District: Refahiye
- Population (2022): 45
- Time zone: UTC+3 (TRT)

Baştosun (Kurdish: Kalur) is a village in the Refahiye District of Erzincan Province in Turkey. The village is populated by Kurds of the Şadiyan tribe and had a population of 45 in 2022.
