= Altköy, Refahiye =

Village in Turkey

Altköy
- Village
- Location in Turkey
- Coordinates: 39°57′N 38°42′E
- Country: Turkey
- Province: Erzincan
- District: Refahiye
- Population (2022): 139
- Time zone: UTC+3 (TRT)

Altköy, formerly known as Altkendi, is a village in the Refahiye District of Erzincan Province in Turkey. The village is populated by Turks and had a population of 139 in 2022.
