= Gümüşakar, Refahiye =

Village in Turkey

Gümüşakar
- Village
- Location in Turkey
- Coordinates: 39.799°N 38.675°E
- Country: Turkey
- Province: Erzincan
- District: Refahiye
- Population (2022): 81
- Time zone: UTC+3 (TRT)

Gümüşakar (Kurdish: Koçgiri) is a village in the Refahiye District of Erzincan Province in Turkey. The village is populated by Kurds of the Izol and Koçgiri tribes and had a population of 81 in 2022.
