= Yıldızören, Refahiye =

Village in Turkey

Yıldızören
- Village
- Location in Turkey
- Coordinates: 39.917°N 38.507°E
- Country: Turkey
- Province: Erzincan
- District: Refahiye
- Population (2022): 101
- Time zone: UTC+3 (TRT)

Yıldızören, formerly Köst, is a village in the Refahiye District of Erzincan Province in Turkey. The village is populated by Turks and had a population of 101 in 2022.
