= Aşut, Refahiye =

Village in Turkey

Aşut
- Village
- Location in Turkey
- Coordinates: 39.9484°N 38.6867°E
- Country: Turkey
- Province: Erzincan
- District: Refahiye
- Population (2022): 29
- Time zone: UTC+3 (TRT)

Aşut is a village in the Refahiye District of Erzincan Province in Turkey. The village had a population of 29 in 2022.

== Notable people ==
- Türkan Örs Baştuğ
