= Perçem, Refahiye =

Village in Turkey

Perçem
- Village
- Location in Turkey
- Coordinates: 40.048°N 38.847°E
- Country: Turkey
- Province: Erzincan
- District: Refahiye
- Population (2022): 47
- Time zone: UTC+3 (TRT)

Perçem is a village in the Refahiye District of Erzincan Province in Turkey. The village is populated by Turks and had a population of 47 in 2022.
