= Karayaprak, Refahiye =

Village in Turkey

Karayaprak
- Village
- Location in Turkey
- Coordinates: 40.0411°N 38.985°E
- Country: Turkey
- Province: Erzincan
- District: Refahiye
- Population (2022): 23
- Time zone: UTC+3 (TRT)

Karayaprak is a village in the Refahiye District of Erzincan Province in Turkey. The village is populated by Kurds of the Şadiyan tribe and had a population of 23 in 2022.
