= Çaltı, Refahiye =

Village in Turkey

Çaltı
- Village
- Location in Turkey
- Coordinates: 39.969°N 38.989°E
- Country: Turkey
- Province: Erzincan
- District: Refahiye
- Population (2022): 12
- Time zone: UTC+3 (TRT)

Çaltı (Kurdish: Çaltu) is a village in the Refahiye District of Erzincan Province in Turkey. The village is populated by Kurds of the Şadiyan tribe and had a population of 12 in 2022.
