= Kırıktaş, Refahiye =

Village in Turkey

Kırıktaş
- Village
- Location in Turkey
- Coordinates: 39.857°N 38.660°E
- Country: Turkey
- Province: Erzincan
- District: Refahiye
- Population (2022): 24
- Time zone: UTC+3 (TRT)

Kırıktaş is a village in the Refahiye District of Erzincan Province in Turkey. The village is populated by Kurds of the Hormek and had a population of 24 in 2022.
