= Ağamçağam, Otlukbeli =

Village in Erzincan Province, Turkey

Ağamçağam
- Village
- Location within Turkey
- Coordinates: 40.010°N 40.054°E
- Country: Turkey
- Province: Erzincan
- District: Otlukbeli
- Population (2021): 105
- Time zone: UTC+3 (TRT)

Ağamçağam is a village in the Otlukbeli District, Erzincan Province, Turkey. It had a population of 105 in 2021.

The hamlet of Ağamçağamkomu is attached to the village.
