= Yukarısütlü, Refahiye =

Village in Turkey

Yukarısütlü
- Village
- Location in Turkey
- Coordinates: 39°59′20″N 39°0′20″E
- Country: Turkey
- Province: Erzincan
- District: Refahiye
- Population (2022): 25
- Time zone: UTC+3 (TRT)

Yukarısütlü is a village in the Refahiye District of Erzincan Province in Turkey. The village is populated by Kurds and had a population of 25 in 2022.

== History ==
Temur Agha is credited with founding village along with his family. His brother, Kamber, founded the village of Kamberağa after he left Temur. Boybeyler, has been changed to Yukarı sütlü due to the abundance of dairy products and livestock there.

There are eight households in the Dedepınarı (Cafolu) hamlet, which is part of the settlement. The inhabitants depend on agriculture and animal husbandry for their livelihood. The 15-household village is 37 kilometers from the town.
