= Yeniköy, Otlukbeli =

Village in Erzincan Province, Turkey

Yeniköy
- Village
- Location within Turkey
- Coordinates: 39.981°N 40.099°E
- Country: Turkey
- Province: Erzincan
- District: Otlukbeli
- Population (2021): 34
- Time zone: UTC+3 (TRT)

Yeniköy is a village in the Otlukbeli District, Erzincan Province, Turkey. It had a population of 34 in 2021.
