= Suleyman Karaman =

Turkish politician (born 1956)

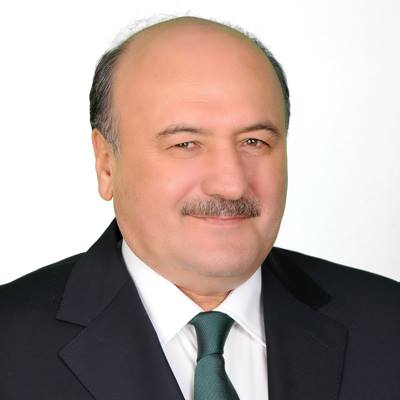
Suleyman Karaman

Suleyman Karaman (born 1956 in Refahiye, Erzincan) is a Turkish politician from the Justice and Development Party, who was a former General Manager and chairman of the Board of Directors of Turkish State Railways (TCDD) and Deputy General Manager of Istanbul transportation authority (IETT).

He was elected to the Grand National Assembly of Turkey in the 2018, and again in 2023.

== Career ==
Between 1979 and 1981, he took part in prototype studies on engines, tractors and agricultural machinery at ITU. Until 1984, in addition to his doctoral studies, he taught technical drawing and machine knowledge courses as a research assistant. Between 1984 and 1994, he worked in the automotive sub-industry as business manager, deputy general manager and board member, respectively. During this period, he participated in the localization of imported parts and as a result of his efforts, he received the "Best Company Award in Localization" from the Automotive Industry Association together with the company he worked for.

In 1994, he was appointed as IETT Assistant General Manager. In this position, he took part in the introduction of modern buses and bus stops in Istanbul and the introduction of AKBİL. During the same period, he took part in the conversion of buses in Istanbul to natural gas to reduce air pollution and the introduction of EURO 2 buses to Istanbul. In addition to these, he also supported social projects and played a role in the introduction of buses with missing persons announcements.

He contributed to seminars on total quality management, continuous development and synergistic management. He worked in ISFALT, ISBAK, ISTON, ISMER and BELTUR, which are the organizations of Istanbul Metropolitan Municipality.

On December 31, 2002, he assumed the duties of general manager and chairman of the board of directors of TCDD Enterprise. During this period, he contributed to the realization of more than 100 railway projects, especially the High Speed Train project. After the Pamukova train accident during his tenure as General Director of TCDD, the request of the Public Prosecutor's Office to open an investigation against him was rejected by the then Minister of Transportation Binali Yıldırım.

== See also ==
- 27th Parliament of Turkey
- 28th Parliament of Turkey
