= Üçören, Refahiye =

Village in Turkey

Üçören
- Village
- Location in Turkey
- Coordinates: 40°03′N 38°47′E
- Country: Turkey
- Province: Erzincan
- District: Refahiye
- Population (2022): 53
- Time zone: UTC+3 (TRT)

Üçören is a village in the Refahiye District of Erzincan Province in Turkey. The village is populated by Turks and had a population of 53 in 2022.
