= Karadivan, Otlukbeli =

Village in Erzincan Province, Turkey

Karadivan
- Village
- Location within Turkey
- Coordinates: 39.942°N 40.068°E
- Country: Turkey
- Province: Erzincan
- District: Otlukbeli
- Population (2021): 102
- Time zone: UTC+3 (TRT)

Karadivan is a village in the Otlukbeli District, Erzincan Province, Turkey. It had a population of 102 in 2021.
