= Doğandere, Refahiye =

Village in Turkey

Doğandere
- Village
- Location in Turkey
- Coordinates: 39.792°N 38.856°E
- Country: Turkey
- Province: Erzincan
- District: Refahiye
- Population (2022): 32
- Time zone: UTC+3 (TRT)

Doğandere, formerly Esirgah, is a village in the Refahiye District of Erzincan Province in Turkey. The village is populated by Turks and had a population of 32 in 2022.
