= Bölüktepe, Refahiye =

Village in Turkey

Bölüktepe
- Village
- Location in Turkey
- Coordinates: 39.7674°N 38.8344°E
- Country: Turkey
- Province: Erzincan
- District: Refahiye
- Population (2022): 11
- Time zone: UTC+3 (TRT)

Bölüktepe, formerly known as Gelbulas, is a village in the Refahiye District of Erzincan Province in Turkey. The village had a population of 11 in 2022.
