= Resullar, Refahiye =

Village in Turkey

Resullar
- Village
- Location in Turkey
- Coordinates: 39.799°N 38.596°E
- Country: Turkey
- Province: Erzincan
- District: Refahiye
- Population (2022): 42
- Time zone: UTC+3 (TRT)

Resullar is a village in the Refahiye District of Erzincan Province in Turkey. The village is populated by Kurds of the Koçgiri tribe and had a population of 42 in 2022.
