= Konakköy, Refahiye =

Village in Turkey

Konakköy
- Village
- Location in Turkey
- Coordinates: 39.874°N 38.541°E
- Country: Turkey
- Province: Erzincan
- District: Refahiye
- Population (2022): 73
- Time zone: UTC+3 (TRT)

Konakköy, formerly Kocu, is a village in the Refahiye District of Erzincan Province in Turkey. The village is populated by Kurds of the Çarekan and Zerikan tribes and had a population of 73 in 2022.
