= Aydıncık, Refahiye =

Village in Turkey

Aydıncık
- Village
- Location in Turkey
- Coordinates: 39.8296°N 38.8464°E
- Country: Turkey
- Province: Erzincan
- District: Refahiye
- Population (2022): 67
- Time zone: UTC+3 (TRT)

Aydıncık is a village in the Refahiye District of Erzincan Province in Turkey. The village is populated by Turks and had a population of 67 in 2022.

== History ==
The village was damaged due to the 1939 Erzincan earthquake.
