= Refahiye District =

District of Erzincan Province, Turkey

- District
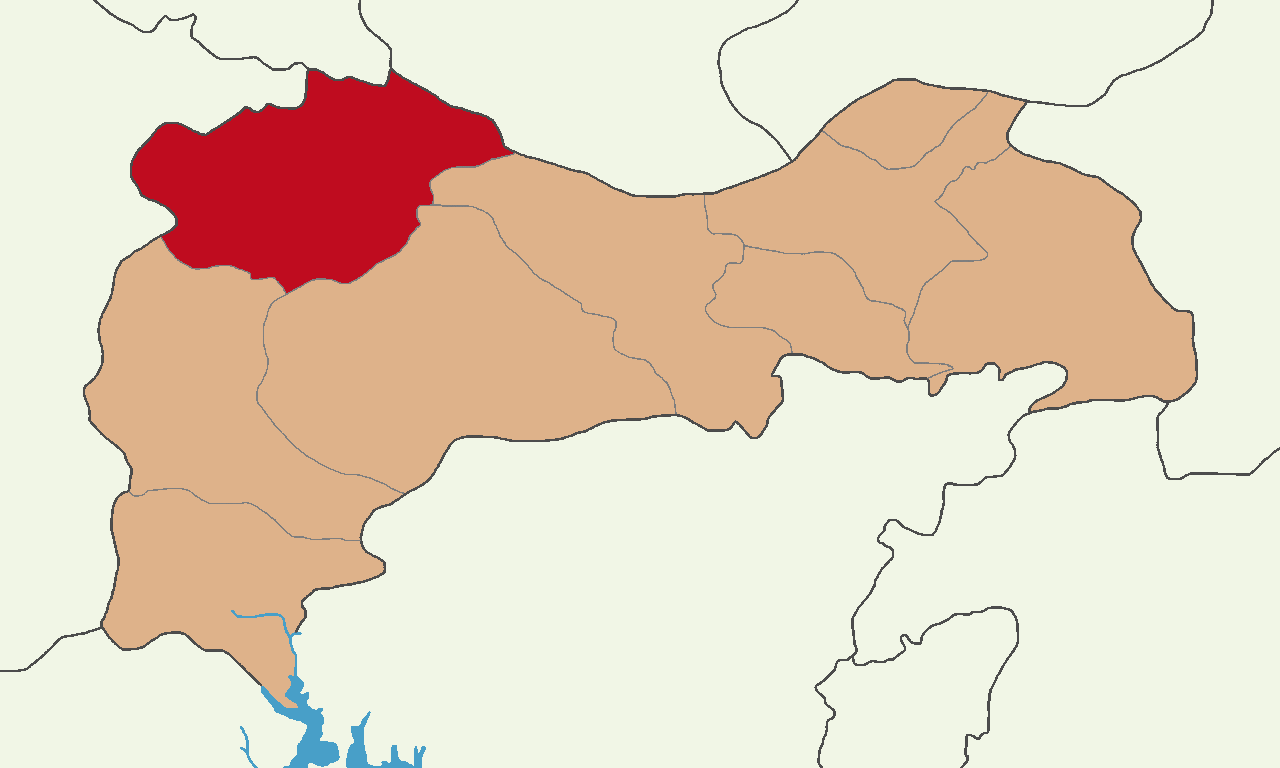
- Map showing Refahiye District in Erzincan Province

- Location in Turkey
- Coordinates: 39°54′N 38°46′E
- Country: Turkey
- Province: Erzincan
- Seat: Refahiye

Government
  - Kaymakam: Ömer Faruk Canpolat
- Area: 1,808 km^{2} (698 sq mi)
- Population (2022): 11,269
  - Density: 6.2/km^{2} (16/sq mi)
- Time zone: UTC+3 (TRT)
- Website: www.refahiye.gov.tr

Refahiye District is a district of the Erzincan Province of Turkey. Its seat is the town of Refahiye. Its area is 1,808 km^{2}, and its population is 11,269 (2022).

== Composition ==
The district is predominantly populated by Sunni Turks and Alevi Kurds. There are moreover a Georgian presence among the Sunni Turkish-populated villages and few Alevi Turkish villages as well.

Some of the settlements were formerly populated by either Armenians or Greeks.

== Settlements ==
There is one municipality in Refahiye District:

- Refahiye

There are 121 villages in Refahiye District:

- Ağmusa
- Akarsu
- Akbağ
- Akçiğdem
- Alacatlı
- Alaçayır
- Alapınar
- Altköy
- Ardıçlık
- Armutlu
- Arpayazı
- Aşağısütlü
- Aslanyusuf
- Aşut
- Avşarözü
- Aydıncık
- Aydoğan
- Babaaslan
- Bakacak
- Baloğlu
- Baştosun
- Biçer
- Bölüktepe
- Bostandere
- Çaltı
- Çamdibi
- Çamlımülk
- Çatak
- Çatalçam
- Çatköy
- Çavuşköy
- Cengerli
- Çiçekali
- Çıragediği
- Çukurçimen
- Çukuryazı
- Damlaca
- Derebaşı
- Diştaş
- Diyarlar
- Doğandere
- Dolaylı
- Ekecik
- Erecek
- Gazipınarı
- Gemecik
- Göçevi
- Gökseki
- Gölköy
- Gülensu
- Gümüşakar
- Günyüzü
- Güventepe
- Güzle
- Hacıköy
- Halitler
- Kabuller
- Kaçakköy
- Kadıköy
- Kalkancı
- Kamberağa
- Kandilköy
- Kanlıtaş
- Karasu
- Karayaprak
- Kayıköy
- Kazören
- Keçegöz
- Kersen
- Kırantepe
- Kırıktaş
- Kırkbulak
- Kızıleniş
- Koçkaya
- Konakköy
- Kürelik
- Kuzuluk
- Laleli
- Leventler
- Madendere
- Mendemebaşı
- Mendemeçukuru
- Merkez Kalkancı
- Muratçayırı
- Mülkköy
- Olgunlar
- Onurlu
- Ören
- Ortagöze
- Perçem
- Pınaryolu
- Resullar
- Sağlık
- Şahaloğlu
- Şahverdi
- Saipköy
- Salur
- Sarhan
- Sarıbayır
- Sarıkoç
- Sıralı
- Söğütlü
- Teknecik
- Tepeköy
- Topağaç
- Tülüköy
- Tuzluçayır
- Üçören
- Ulucak
- Uludere
- Yaylabeli
- Yaylapınar
- Yazıgediği
- Yazıköy
- Yeniköy
- Yeniyurt
- Yıldızören
- Yukarısütlü
- Yukarıyeniköy
- Yurtbaşı
- Yuvadağı

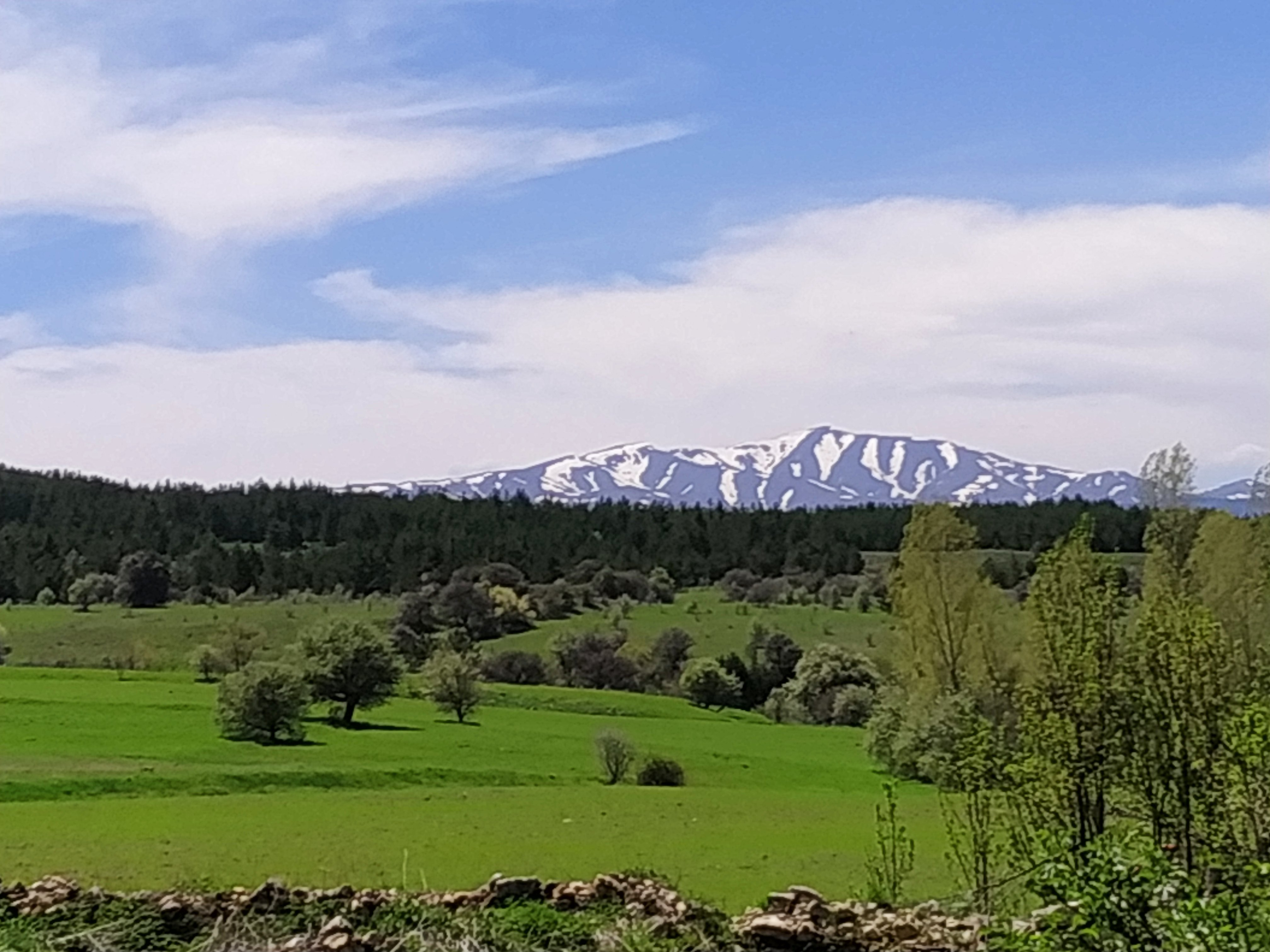
landscape of Refahiye, with Kızıldağ in the distance
