= Şahverdi, Refahiye =

Village in Turkey

Şahverdi
- Village
- Location in Turkey
- Coordinates: 39.857°N 38.821°E
- Country: Turkey
- Province: Erzincan
- District: Refahiye
- Population (2022): 67
- Time zone: UTC+3 (TRT)

Şahverdi is a village in the Refahiye District of Erzincan Province in Turkey. The village is populated by Kurds and had a population of 67 in 2022.
