= Söğütlü, Otlukbeli =

Village in Erzincan Province, Turkey

Söğütlü
- Village
- Location within Turkey
- Coordinates: 39.978°N 40.114°E
- Country: Turkey
- Province: Erzincan
- District: Otlukbeli
- Population (2021): 18
- Time zone: UTC+3 (TRT)

Söğütlü is a village in the Otlukbeli District, Erzincan Province, Turkey. It had a population of 18 in 2021.

The hamlet of Sati is attached to the village.
