= Yurtbaşı, Refahiye =

Village in Turkey

Yurtbaşı
- Village
- Location in Turkey
- Coordinates: 39°55′6″N 38°55′27″E
- Country: Turkey
- Province: Erzincan
- District: Refahiye
- Population (2022): 340
- Time zone: UTC+3 (TRT)

Yurtbaşı, formerly Melikşerif, is a village in the Refahiye District of Erzincan Province in Turkey. The village is populated by Turks and had a population of 340 in 2022.
