= Ekecik, Refahiye =

Village in Turkey

Ekecik
- Village
- Location in Turkey
- Coordinates: 39.925°N 38.959°E
- Country: Turkey
- Province: Erzincan
- District: Refahiye
- Population (2022): 139
- Time zone: UTC+3 (TRT)

Ekecik is a village in the Refahiye District of Erzincan Province in Turkey. The village is populated by Turks and had a population of 139 in 2022.
