= Otlukbeli District =

District of Erzincan Province, Turkey

- District
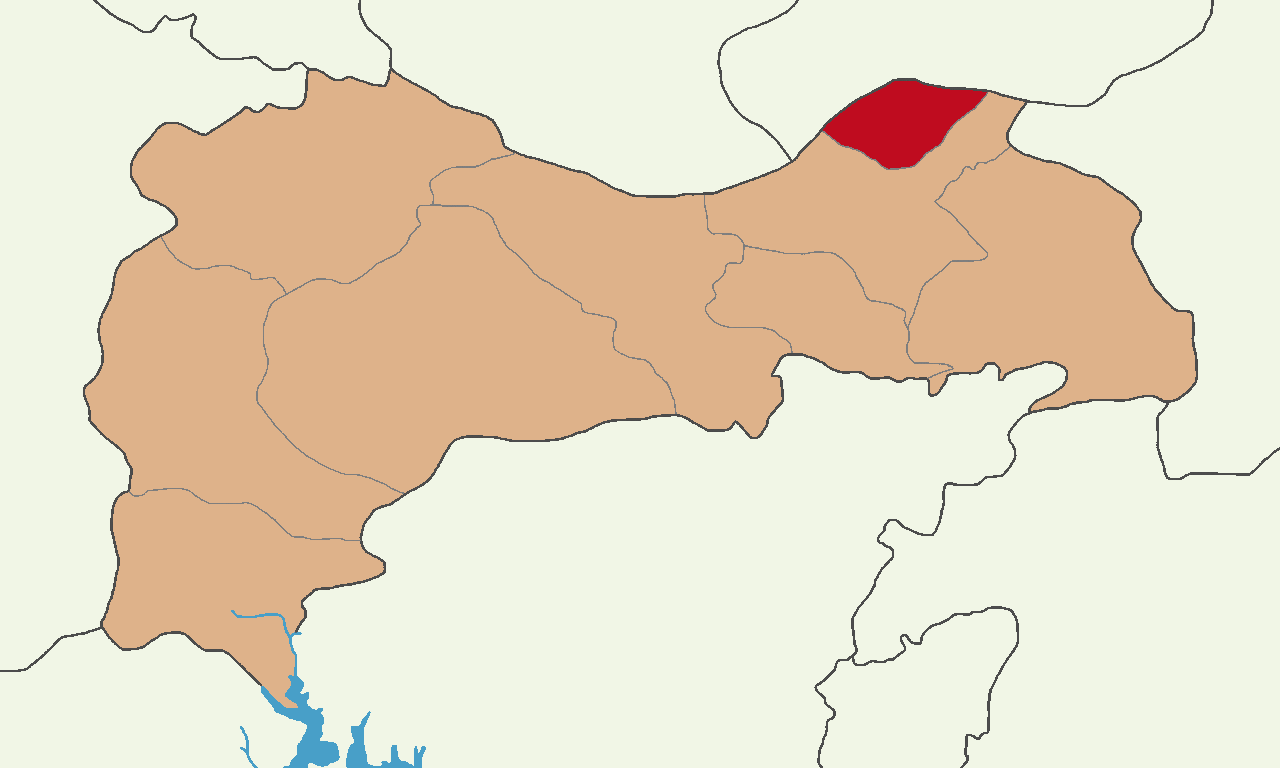
- Map showing Otlukbeli District in Erzincan Province

- Location in Turkey
- Coordinates: 39°58′N 40°01′E
- Country: Turkey
- Province: Erzincan
- Seat: Otlukbeli
- Area: 320 km^{2} (120 sq mi)
- Population (2021): 2,577
  - Density: 8.1/km^{2} (21/sq mi)
- Time zone: UTC+3 (TRT)
- Website: www.otlukbeli.gov.tr

Otlukbeli District is a district of Erzincan Province in Turkey. The municipality of Otlukbeli is the seat and the district had a population of 2,577 in 2021. It is the least populated district in the province. Its area is 320 km^{2}.

The district was established in 1990.

== Composition ==
The district encompasses one municipality (Otlukbeli), ten villages and two hamlets.

The villages are:

- Ağamçağam
- Avcıçayırı
- Boğazlı
- Karadivan
- Küçükotlukbeli
- Ördekhacı
- Söğütlü
- Umurlu
- Yeniköy
- Yeşilbük
