= Leventler, Refahiye =

Village in Turkey

Leventler
- Village
- Location in Turkey
- Coordinates: 39°57′51″N 38°58′47″E
- Country: Turkey
- Province: Erzincan
- District: Refahiye
- Population (2022): 30
- Time zone: UTC+3 (TRT)

Leventler is a village in the Refahiye District of Erzincan Province in Turkey. The village is populated by Kurds of the Şadiyan tribe and had a population of 30 in 2022.
