= Tülüköy, Refahiye =

Village in Turkey

Tülüköy
- Village
- Location in Turkey
- Coordinates: 39°56′N 38°33′E
- Country: Turkey
- Province: Erzincan
- District: Refahiye
- Population (2022): 15
- Time zone: UTC+3 (TRT)

Tülüköy is a village in the Refahiye District of Erzincan Province in Turkey. The village is populated by Turks and had a population of 15 in 2022.
