= Gemecik, Refahiye =

Village in Turkey

Gemecik
- Village
- Location in Turkey
- Coordinates: 39.888°N 38.442°E
- Country: Turkey
- Province: Erzincan
- District: Refahiye
- Population (2022): 90
- Time zone: UTC+3 (TRT)

Gemecik is a village in the Refahiye District of Erzincan Province in Turkey. The village is populated by Kurds of the Koçgiri and Zerikan tribes and had a population of 90 in 2022.
