= Kaçakköy, Refahiye =

Village in Turkey

Kaçakköy
- Village
- Location in Turkey
- Coordinates: 39.926°N 38.976°E
- Country: Turkey
- Province: Erzincan
- District: Refahiye
- Population (2022): 42
- Time zone: UTC+3 (TRT)

Kaçakköy is a village in the Refahiye District of Erzincan Province in Turkey. Its population is 42 (2022). The hamlet of Gölcük is attached to the village.

Both Kaçakköy and Gölcük are populated by Kurds of the Şadiyan tribe.
