= Kadıköy, Refahiye =

Village in Turkey

Kadıköy
- Village
- Location in Turkey
- Coordinates: 39.946°N 38.453°E
- Country: Turkey
- Province: Erzincan
- District: Refahiye
- Population (2022): 34
- Time zone: UTC+3 (TRT)

Kadıköy is a village in the Refahiye District of Erzincan Province in Turkey. The village is populated by Kurds of the Hormek, Izol and Koçgiri tribes and had a population of 34 in 2022.

It is a former Greek village.
