= Kuzuluk, Refahiye =

Village in Turkey

Kuzuluk
- Village
- Location in Turkey
- Coordinates: 40.007°N 38.684°E
- Country: Turkey
- Province: Erzincan
- District: Refahiye
- Population (2022): 38
- Time zone: UTC+3 (TRT)

Kuzuluk is a village in the Refahiye District of Erzincan Province in Turkey. The village is populated by Turks and had a population of 38 in 2022.

It is a former Greek village and formerly had a Kurdish population as well.
