= Aslanyusuf, Refahiye =

Village in Turkey

Aslanyusuf
- Village
- Location in Turkey
- Coordinates: 39°54′N 38°32′E
- Country: Turkey
- Province: Erzincan
- District: Refahiye
- Population (2022): 61
- Time zone: UTC+3 (TRT)

Aslanyusuf, formerly known as Oğlanyusuf, is a village in the Refahiye District of Erzincan Province in Turkey. The village is populated by Turks and had a population of 61 in 2022.
