= Aydoğan, Refahiye =

Village in Turkey

Aydoğan
- Village
- Location in Turkey
- Coordinates: 39.8999°N 38.5785°E
- Country: Turkey
- Province: Erzincan
- District: Refahiye
- Population (2022): 249
- Time zone: UTC+3 (TRT)

Aydoğan, formerly known as Zöhrep, is a village in the Refahiye District of Erzincan Province in Turkey. The village is populated by Turks and had a population of 249 in 2022.
