= Gülensu, Refahiye =

Village in Turkey

Gülensu
- Village
- Location in Turkey
- Coordinates: 39.761°N 38.766°E
- Country: Turkey
- Province: Erzincan
- District: Refahiye
- Population (2022): 20
- Time zone: UTC+3 (TRT)

Gülensu, formerly Hıştolar, is a village in the Refahiye District of Erzincan Province in Turkey. The village is populated by Kurds of the Şadiyan tribe and had a population of 20 in 2022.
