= Avşarözü, Refahiye =

Village in Turkey

Avşarözü
- Village
- Location in Turkey
- Coordinates: 39°52′N 38°47′E
- Country: Turkey
- Province: Erzincan
- District: Refahiye
- Population (2022): 69
- Time zone: UTC+3 (TRT)

Avşarözü is a village in the Refahiye District of Erzincan Province in Turkey. Its population is 69 (2022).
