= Kersen, Refahiye =

Village in Turkey

Kersen
- Village
- Location in Turkey
- Coordinates: 39.787°N 38.878°E
- Country: Turkey
- Province: Erzincan
- District: Refahiye
- Population (2022): 30
- Time zone: UTC+3 (TRT)

Kersen is a village in the Refahiye District of Erzincan Province in Turkey. The village is populated by Turks and had a population of 30 in 2022.
