= Kazören, Refahiye =

Village in Turkey

Kazören
- Village
- Location in Turkey
- Coordinates: 40°02′N 38°56′E
- Country: Turkey
- Province: Erzincan
- District: Refahiye
- Population (2022): 98
- Time zone: UTC+3 (TRT)

Kazören is a village in the Refahiye District of Erzincan Province in Turkey. The village is populated by Turks and had a population of 98 in 2022.
