= Ulucak, Refahiye =

Village in Turkey

Ulucak
- Village
- Location in Turkey
- Coordinates: 39.904°N 38.841°E
- Country: Turkey
- Province: Erzincan
- District: Refahiye
- Population (2022): 73
- Time zone: UTC+3 (TRT)

Ulucak is a village in the Refahiye District of Erzincan Province in Turkey. The village is populated by Turks and had a population of 73 in 2022.
