= Keçegöz, Refahiye =

Village in Turkey

Keçegöz
- Village
- Location in Turkey
- Coordinates: 39°48′N 38°50′E
- Country: Turkey
- Province: Erzincan
- District: Refahiye
- Population (2022): 29
- Time zone: UTC+3 (TRT)

Keçegöz is a village in the Refahiye District of Erzincan Province in Turkey. The village is populated by Turks and had a population of 29 in 2022.
