= Çıragediği, Refahiye =

Village in Turkey

Çıragediği
- Village
- Location in Turkey
- Coordinates: 39.805°N 38.523°E
- Country: Turkey
- Province: Erzincan
- District: Refahiye
- Population (2022): 52
- Time zone: UTC+3 (TRT)

Çıragediği is a village in the Refahiye District of Erzincan Province in Turkey. The village is populated by Kurds of the Şêxhesen tribe and had a population of 52 in 2022.
