= Kürelik, Refahiye =

Village in Turkey

Kürelik
- Village
- Location in Turkey
- Coordinates: 39.940°N 38.756°E
- Country: Turkey
- Province: Erzincan
- District: Refahiye
- Population (2022): 86
- Time zone: UTC+3 (TRT)

Kürelik is a village in the Refahiye District of Erzincan Province in Turkey. The village is populated by Kurds of the Hormek tribe and had a population of 86 in 2022.
