= Diyarlar, Refahiye =

Village in Turkey

Diyarlar
- Village
- Location in Turkey
- Coordinates: 39.788°N 38.709°E
- Country: Turkey
- Province: Erzincan
- District: Refahiye
- Population (2022): 31
- Time zone: UTC+3 (TRT)

Diyarlar is a village in the Refahiye District of Erzincan Province in Turkey, populated by 31 Kurds of the Koçgiri tribe in 2022.
