= Kalkancı, Refahiye =

Village in Turkey

Kalkancı
- Village
- Location in Turkey
- Coordinates: 39.794°N 38.552°E
- Country: Turkey
- Province: Erzincan
- District: Refahiye
- Population (2022): 72
- Time zone: UTC+3 (TRT)

Kalkancı, also known as Kuruçay Kalkancı, is a village in the Refahiye District of Erzincan Province in Turkey. The village is populated by Kurds of the Koçgiri and Zerikan tribes and had a population of 72 in 2022.
