= Çavuşköy, Refahiye =

Village in Turkey

Çavuşköy
- Village
- Location in Turkey
- Coordinates: 39.965°N 38.668°E
- Country: Turkey
- Province: Erzincan
- District: Refahiye
- Population (2022): 47
- Time zone: UTC+3 (TRT)

Çavuşköy is a village in the Refahiye District of Erzincan Province in Turkey. Its population is 47 (2022).
