= Kabuller, Refahiye =

Village in Turkey

Kabuller
- Village
- Location in Turkey
- Coordinates: 39.789°N 38.733°E
- Country: Turkey
- Province: Erzincan
- District: Refahiye
- Population (2022): 25
- Time zone: UTC+3 (TRT)

Kabuller is a village in the Refahiye District of Erzincan Province in Turkey. The village is populated by Kurds of the Şadiyan tribe and had a population of 25 in 2022.
