= Akarsu, Refahiye =

Village in Turkey

Akarsu
- Village
- Location in Turkey
- Coordinates: 39.9342°N 38.6245°E
- Country: Turkey
- Province: Erzincan
- District: Refahiye
- Population (2022): 78
- Time zone: UTC+3 (TRT)

Akarsu, formerly Alakilise, is a village in the Refahiye District of Erzincan Province in Turkey. The village is populated by Turks and had a population of 78 in 2022.
