= Yeniyurt, Refahiye =

Village in Turkey

Yeniyurt
- Village
- Location in Turkey
- Coordinates: 39.820°N 38.703°E
- Country: Turkey
- Province: Erzincan
- District: Refahiye
- Population (2022): 14
- Time zone: UTC+3 (TRT)

Yeniyurt, formerly Gavuryurdu, is a village in the Refahiye District of Erzincan Province in Turkey. The village is populated by Kurds of the Hormek tribe and had a population of 14 in 2022.
