= Boğazlı, Otlukbeli =

Village in Erzincan Province, Turkey

Boğazlı
- Village
- Location within Turkey
- Coordinates: 39.967°N 39.946°E
- Country: Turkey
- Province: Erzincan
- District: Otlukbeli
- Population (2021): 102
- Time zone: UTC+3 (TRT)

Boğazlı is a village in the Otlukbeli District, Erzincan Province, Turkey. The village is populated by Kurds of the Lolan tribe and had a population of 102 in 2021.
