= Çamdibi, Refahiye =

Village in Turkey

Çamdibi
- Village
- Location in Turkey
- Coordinates: 39.8483°N 38.7569°E
- Country: Turkey
- Province: Erzincan
- District: Refahiye
- Population (2022): 36
- Time zone: UTC+3 (TRT)

Çamdibi, formerly Belensor, is a village in the Refahiye District of Erzincan Province in Turkey. The village had a population of 36 in 2022.
