= Erecek, Refahiye =

Village in Turkey

Erecek
- Village
- Location in Turkey
- Coordinates: 39.798°N 38.914°E
- Country: Turkey
- Province: Erzincan
- District: Refahiye
- Population (2022): 78
- Time zone: UTC+3 (TRT)

Erecek, formerly Mank, is a village in the Refahiye District of Erzincan Province in Turkey. The village is populated by Turks and had a population of 78 in 2022.
