= Şahaloğlu, Refahiye =

Village in Turkey

Şahaloğlu
- Village
- Location in Turkey
- Coordinates: 39.987°N 38.986°E
- Country: Turkey
- Province: Erzincan
- District: Refahiye
- Population (2022): 104
- Time zone: UTC+3 (TRT)

Şahaloğlu (also: Şakaloğlu) is a village in the Refahiye District of Erzincan Province in Turkey. Its population is 104 (2022).
