= Kandilköy, Refahiye =

Village in Turkey

Kandilköy
- Village
- Location in Turkey
- Coordinates: 39.851°N 38.527°E
- Country: Turkey
- Province: Erzincan
- District: Refahiye
- Population (2022): 23
- Time zone: UTC+3 (TRT)

Kandilköy is a village in the Refahiye District of Erzincan Province in Turkey. The village is populated by Kurds of the Çarekan and Zerikan tribes and had a population of 23 in 2022.
