= Umurlu, Otlukbeli =

Village in Erzincan Province, Turkey

Umurlu
- Village
- Location within Turkey
- Coordinates: 40.014°N 40.111°E
- Country: Turkey
- Province: Erzincan
- District: Otlukbeli
- Population (2021): 73
- Time zone: UTC+3 (TRT)

Umurlu is a village in the Otlukbeli District, Erzincan Province, Turkey. It had a population of 73 in 2021.
