= Kerer, Kemah =

Village in Turkey

Kerer
- Village
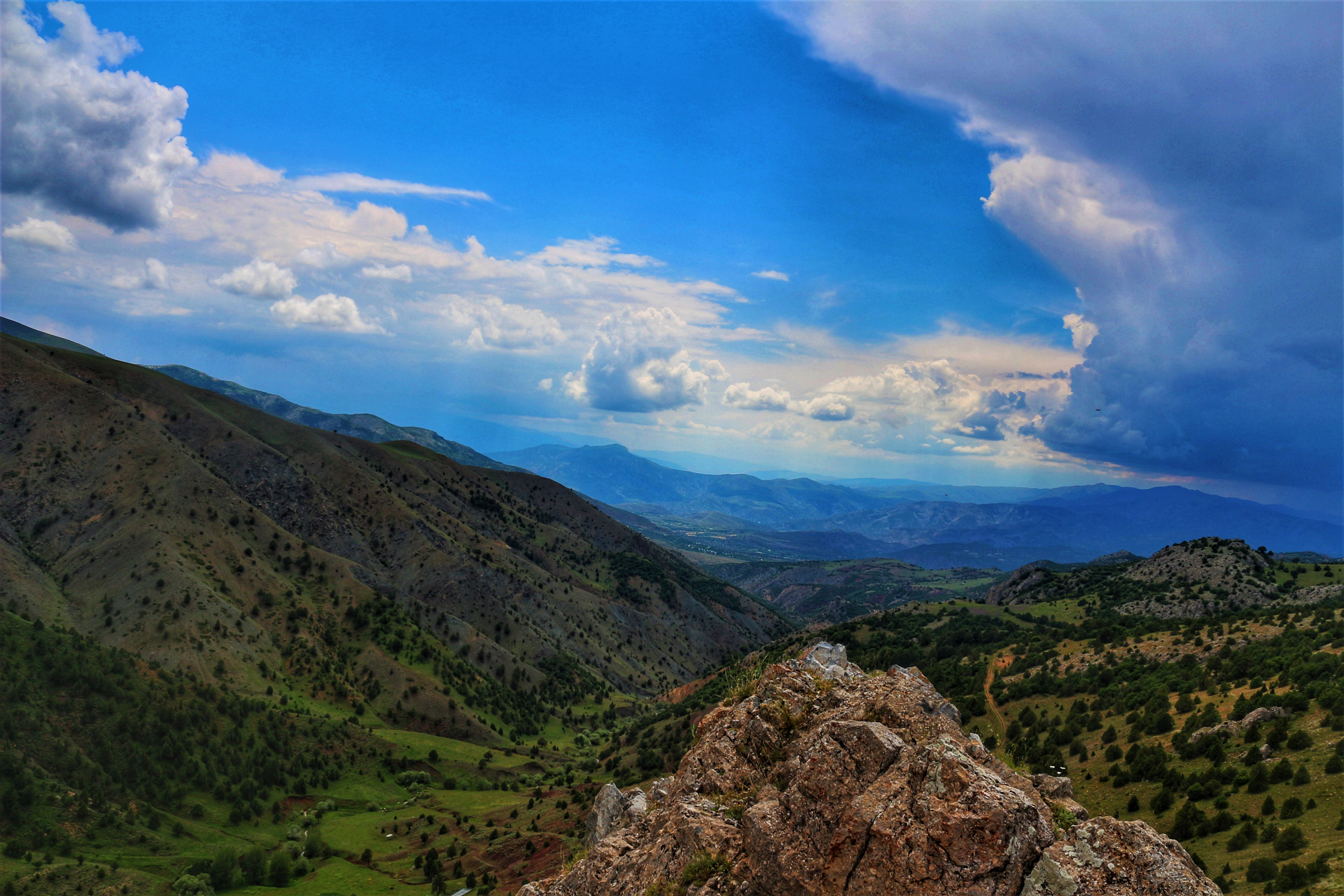

- Location within Turkey
- Coordinates: 39°44′55″N 39°3′9″E
- Country: Turkey
- Province: Erzincan
- District: Kemah
- Population (2022): 317
- Time zone: UTC+3 (TRT)

Kerer is a village in the Kemah District of Erzincan Province in Turkey. Its population is 317 (2022).

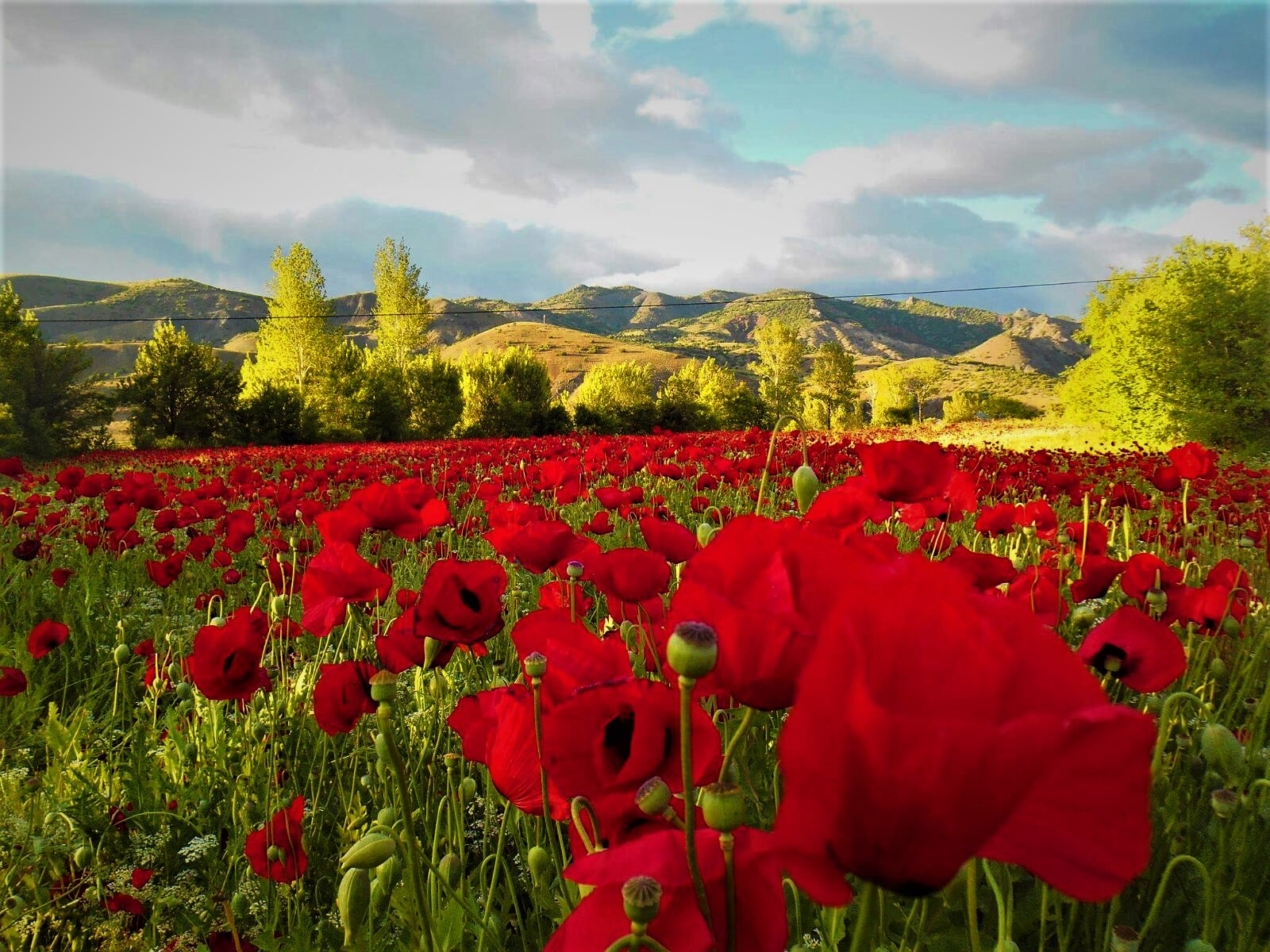
View of red poppy flowers from the village
