= Yeşilbük, Otlukbeli =

Village in Erzincan Province, Turkey

Yeşilbük
- Village
- Location within Turkey
- Coordinates: 40.013°N 40.181°E
- Country: Turkey
- Province: Erzincan
- District: Otlukbeli
- Population (2021): 29
- Time zone: UTC+3 (TRT)

Yeşilbük is a village in the Otlukbeli District, Erzincan Province, Turkey. The village is populated by Kurds of the Lolan tribe and had a population of 29 in 2021.
