= Refahiye =

- Municipality
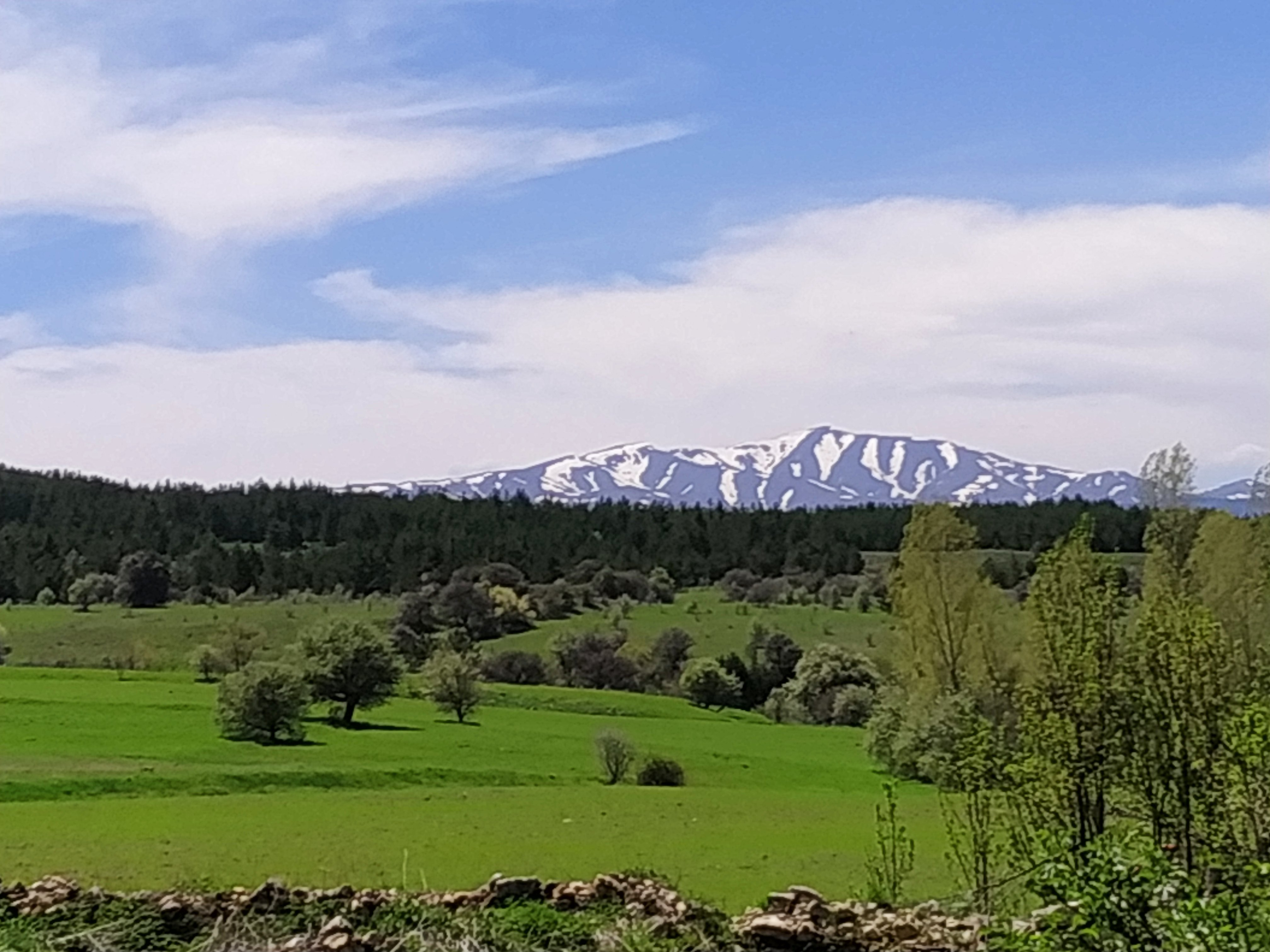

- Location within Turkey
- Coordinates: 39°54′04″N 38°46′07″E
- Country: Turkey
- Province: Erzincan
- District: Refahiye

Government
  - Mayor: Fatih Kök (BBP)
- Elevation: 1,589 m (5,213 ft)
- Population (2022): 4,225
- Time zone: UTC+3 (TRT)
- Area code: 0446
- Website: www.refahiye.bel.tr

Refahiye is a town in Erzincan Province in the Eastern Anatolia region of Turkey. It is the seat of Refahiye District. Its population is 4,225 (2022). The elevation is 1,589 m. The mayor is Fatih Kök (BBP).

The town is divided into the neighborhoods of Binali Yıldırım, Camiişerif, Hakoğlu, Hökümet and Yenidoğan.

== People from Refahiye ==
- Binali Yıldırım (born 1955), Turkish politician, 27th Prime Minister of Turkey (2016–2018) and 28th Speaker of the Grand National Assembly of Turkey (2018–2019).
