= Erzincan Province =

Province of Turkey

Coordinates: 39°40′42″N 39°19′48″E

Erzincan Province Erzincan ili
- Province
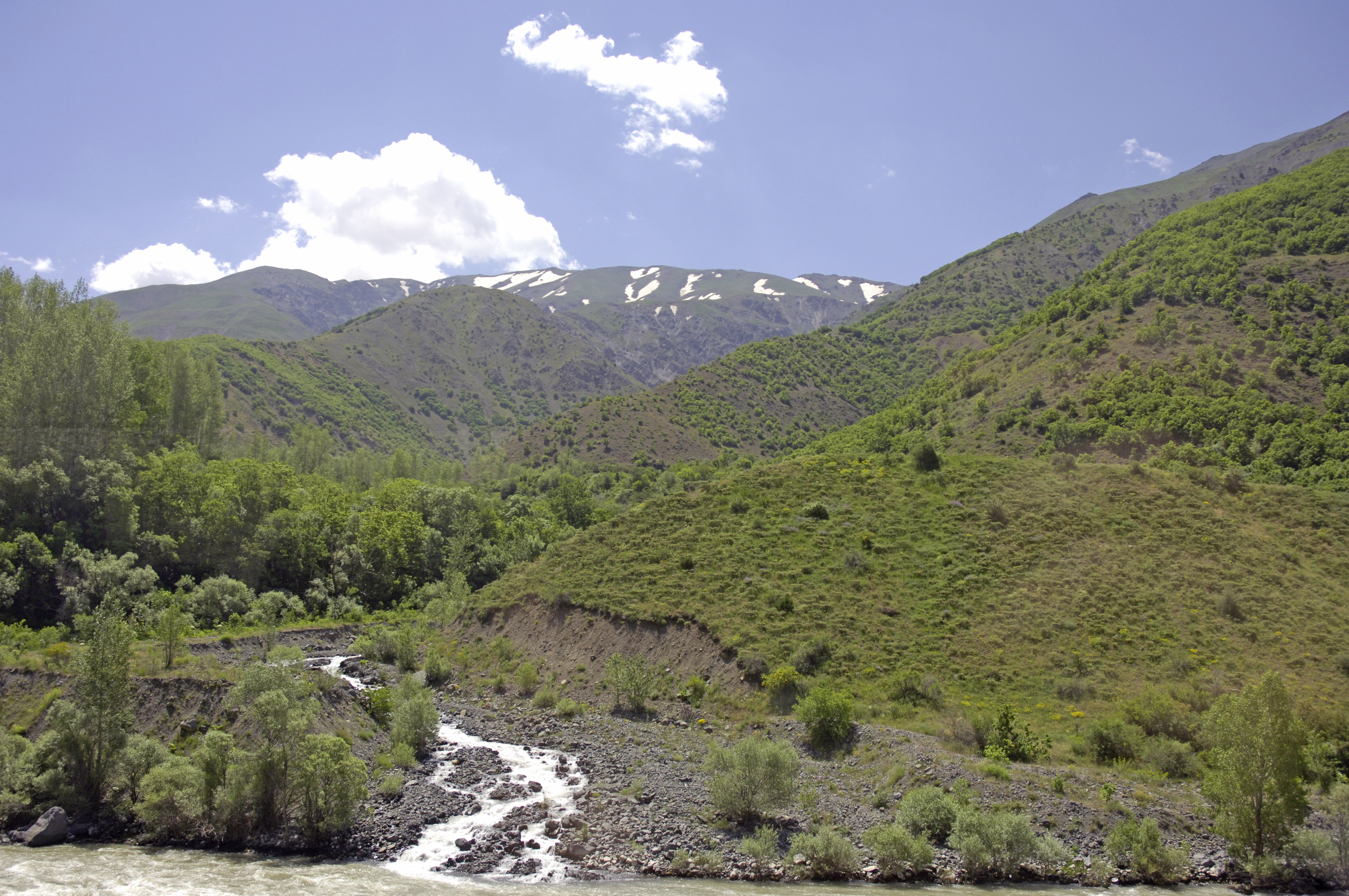
- Mountains in Erzincan to Tercan

- Location of the province within Turkey
- Country: Turkey
- Seat: Erzincan

Government
  - Governor: Hamza Aydoğdu
- Area: 11,815 km^{2} (4,562 sq mi)
- Population (2022): 239,223
  - Density: 20.247/km^{2} (52.441/sq mi)
- Time zone: UTC+3 (TRT)
- Area code: 0446
- Website: www.erzincan.gov.tr

Erzincan Province (Turkish: Erzincan ili); is a province in the Eastern Anatolia region of Turkey. In Turkey, its capital is also called Erzincan. Its area is 11,815 km^{2}, and its population is 239,223 (2022).

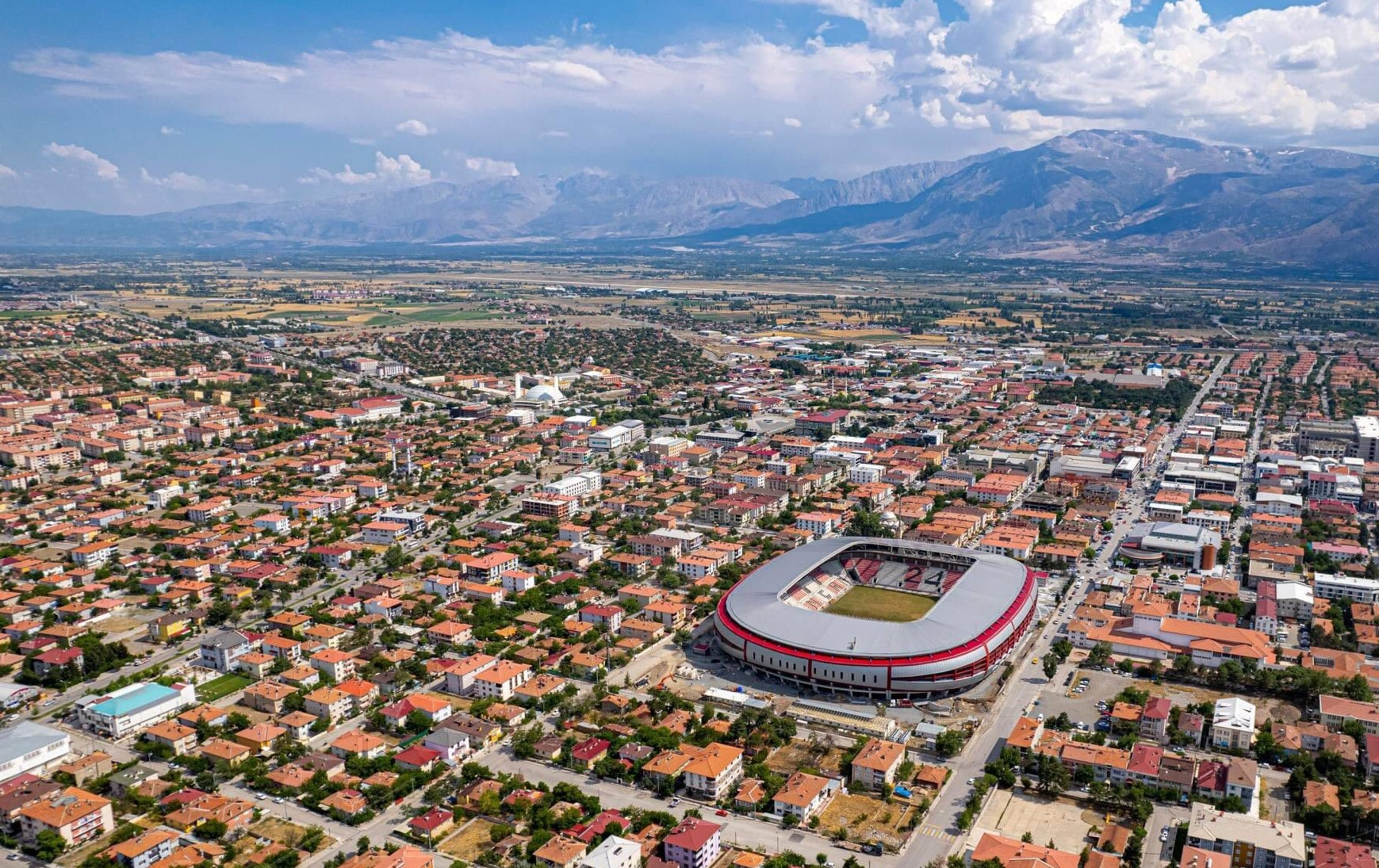
Aerial view of Erzincan city center

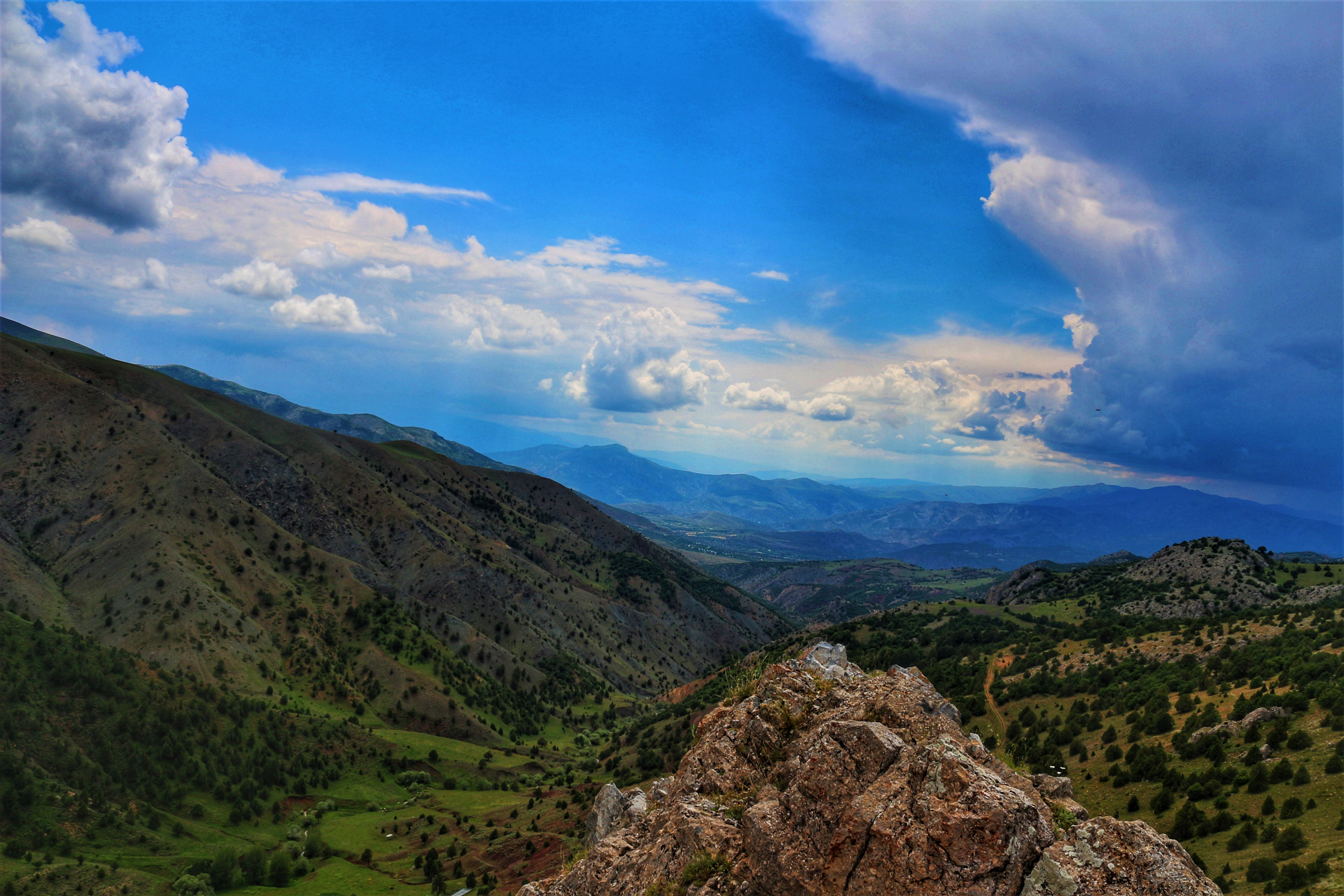
Kerer Village in Erzincan

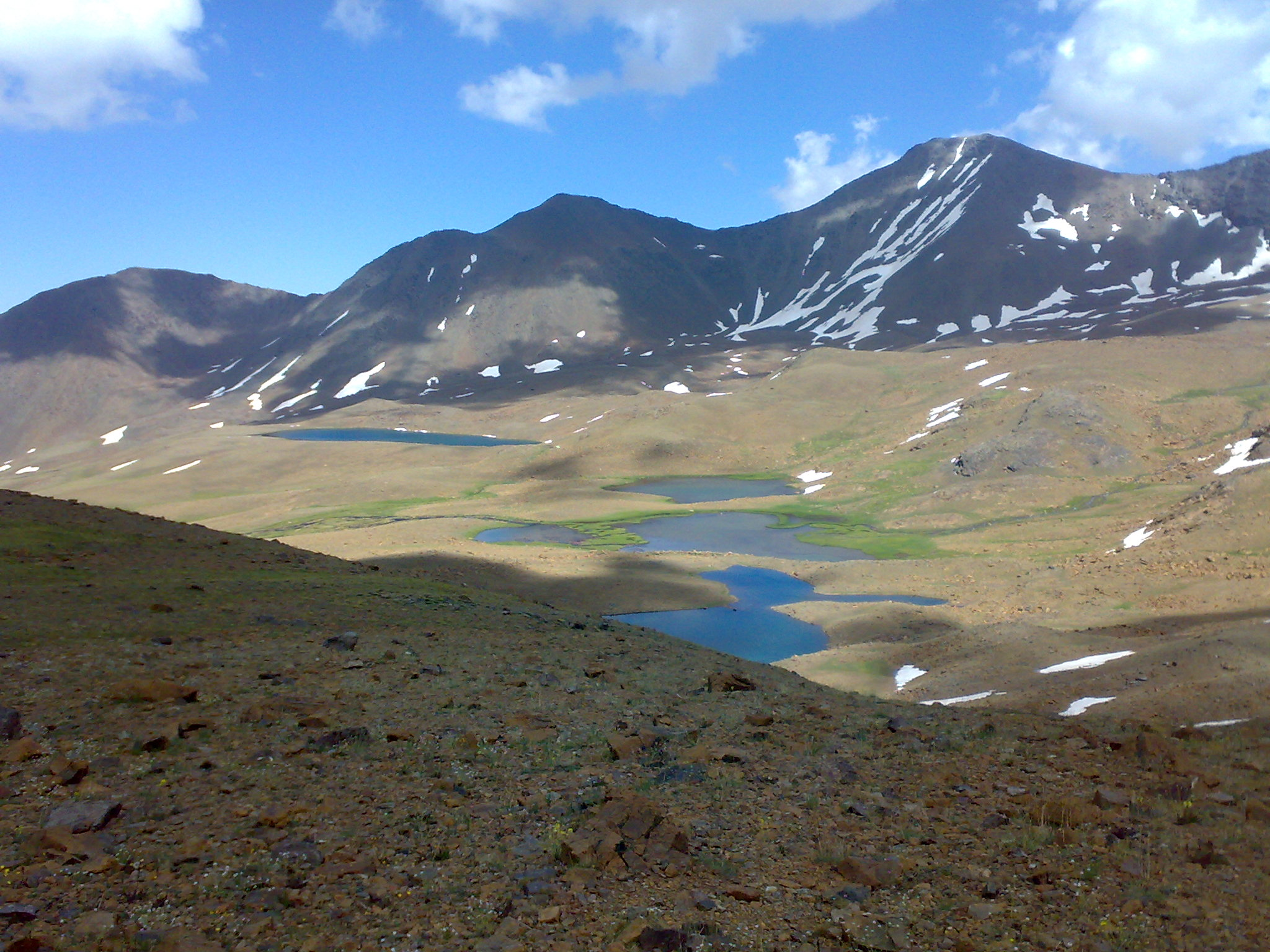
Yedigöller, literally "seven lakes" in Turkish

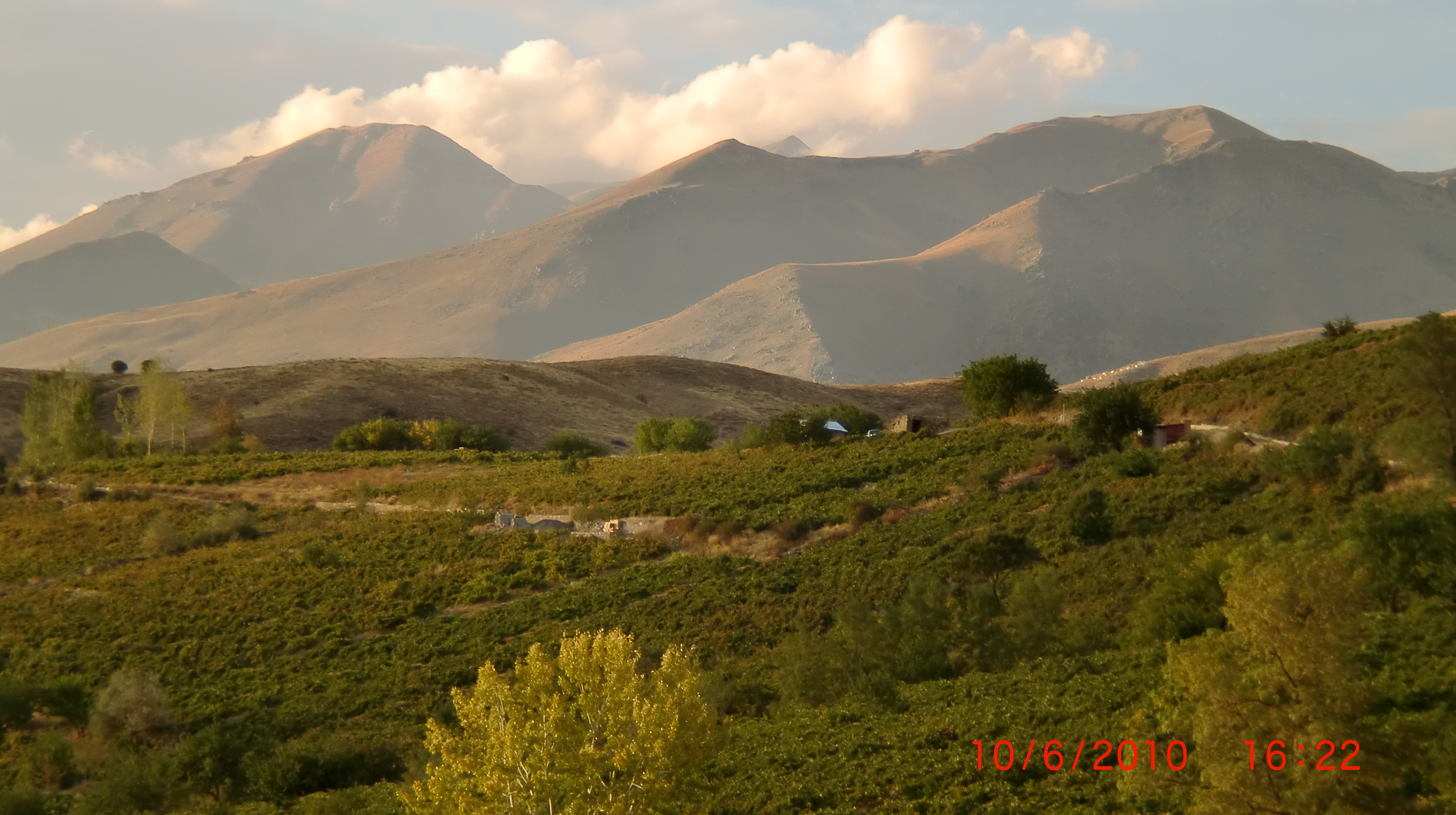
Grape agriculture in Erzincan

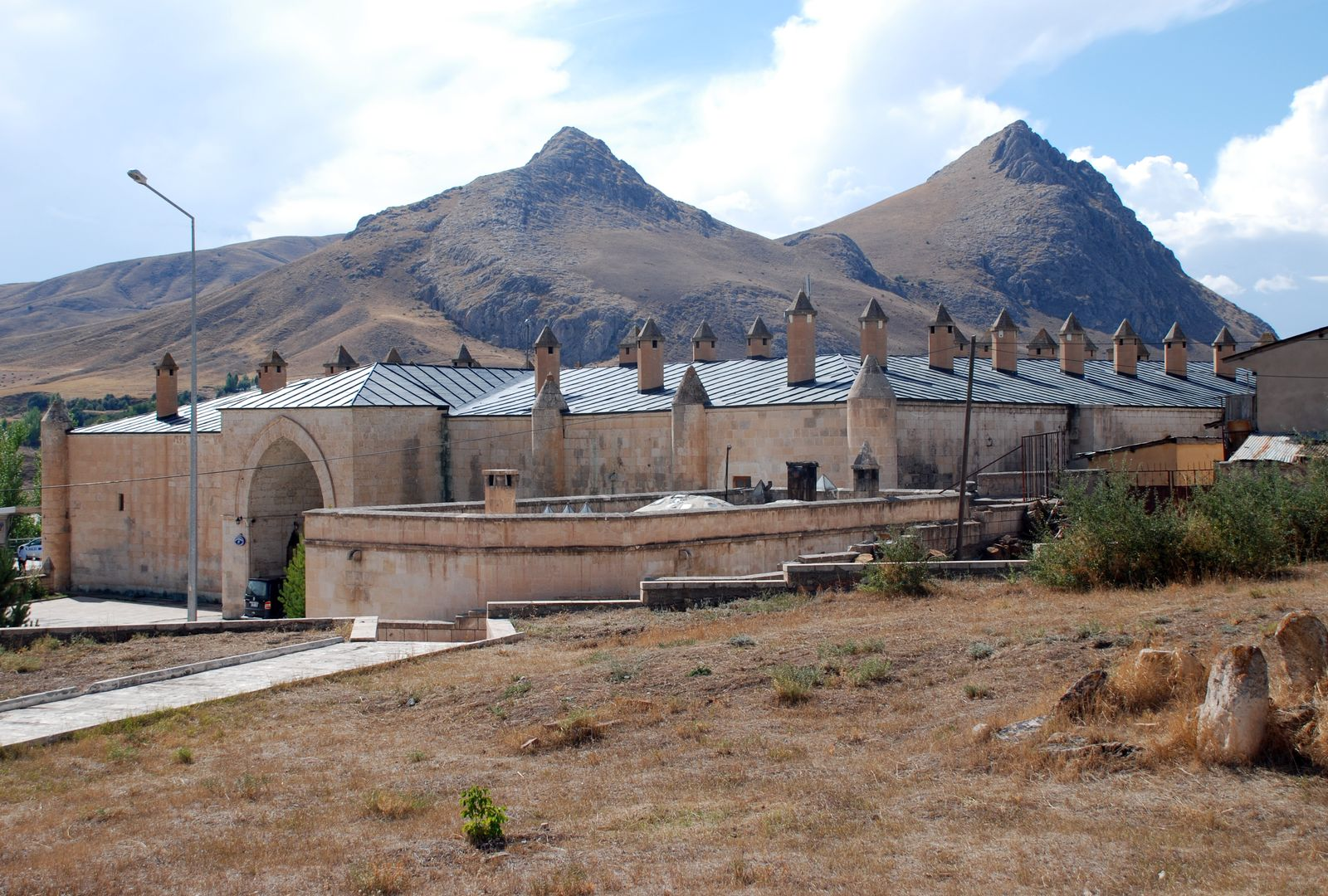
A historical Inn in Erzincan

== Geography ==
Erzincan is traversed by the northeasterly line of equal latitude and longitude. It lies on the Northern Anatolian Fault, where it is often the location for earthquakes such as on 27 December 1939 and 13 March 1992.

== History ==
In September 1935 the third Inspectorate General (Umumi Müfettişlik, UM) was created, into which the Erzincan province was included. Its creation was based on the Law 1164 from June 1927, which was passed in order to Turkefy the population. The Erzincan province was included in this area.

The third UM span over the provinces of Erzurum, Artvin, Rize, Trabzon, Kars, Gümüşhane, Erzincan and Ağrı. It was governed by an Inspector General seated in the city of Erzurum. In January 1936, a Fourth Inspectorate-General was established, under which authority the province was transferred.

The fourth UM included the provinces of Erzincan, Tunceli, Elazığ and the areas which would become the province of Bingöl. The Fourth UM was governed by a Governor Commander. Most of the employees in the municipalities were to be from the military and the Governor Commander had the authority to evacuate whole villages and resettle them in other areas. The Inspectorates General were dissolved in 1952 during the Government of the Democrat Party.

== Districts ==
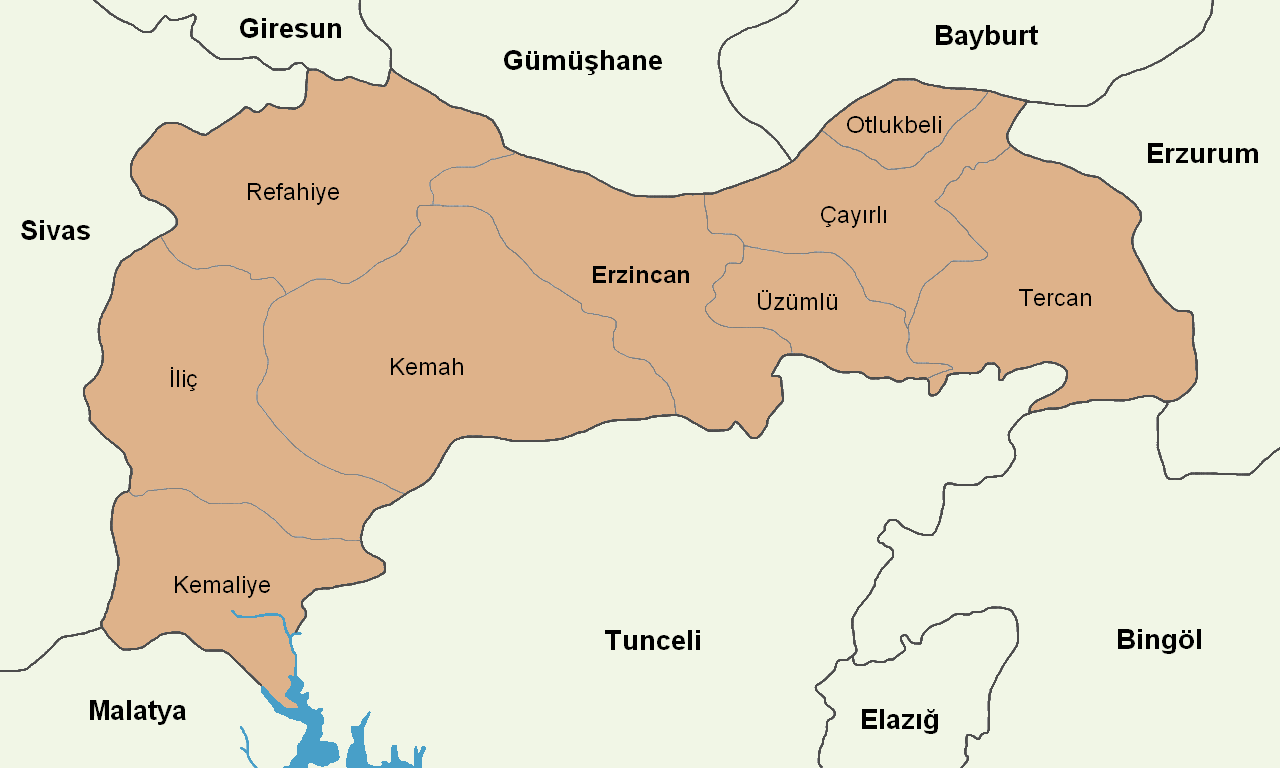
Districts of Erzincan

Erzincan province is divided into 9 districts (capital district in bold):

- Çayırlı
- **Erzincan**
- İliç
- Kemah
- Kemaliye
- Otlukbeli
- Refahiye
- Tercan
- Üzümlü

== See also ==
- 1939 Erzincan earthquake
- List of populated places in Erzincan Province
- Battle of Otlukbeli Martyrs' Monument
