= List of martyrs' monuments and memorials =

This is a list of martyrs' monuments and memorials.

== Algeria ==
- Maqam Echahid, Algiers

== Azerbaijan ==
- Baku Turkish Martyrs' Memorial

== Bangladesh ==
- Jatiyo Smriti Soudho, Dhaka
- Shaheed Minar, Dhaka
- Martyred Intellectuals Memorial, Dhaka
- Swadhinata Stambha, Dhaka

== China ==
- Yuhuatai Memorial Park of Revolutionary Martyrs

== Egypt ==
- Port Said Martyrs Memorial

== Ethiopia ==
- Martyrs Memorial Monument, Bahir Dar
- Martyrs Memorial Monument, Mek'ele
- "Red Terror" Martyrs' Memorial Museum, Addis Ababa

== France ==
- Mémorial des Martyrs de la Déportation

== Germany ==
- Radiation Martyrs' Memorial, Hamburg

== India ==
- Martyrs' Memorial Patna
- Hussainiwala National Martyrs Memorial
- Telangana Martyrs Memorial
- INA Martyr's Memorial
- Azad Maidan
- Bhasha Smritistambha
- Hutatma Chowk
- Namantar Shahid Smarak
- Shaheed Minar, Kolkata

== Iraq ==
- Al-Shaheed Monument, Baghdad
- Halabja Martyrs Monument
- February 1st Martyrs Monument, Erbil.

== Armenia ==
- Tsitsernakaberd

== Japan ==
- Twenty-Six Martyrs Museum and Monument, Nagasaki

== Jordan ==
- The Martyrs' Memorial and Museum

== Lebanon ==
- Martyrs’ Monument, Beirut

== Romania ==
- Martyrs' Monument, Arad

== Turkey ==
- Aviation Martyrs' Monument, Istanbul
- Çanakkale Martyrs' Memorial, Çanakkale
- Mersin Martyrs' Memorial, Mersin
- Battle of Otlukbeli Martyrs' Monument, Otlukbeli

== United Arab Emirates ==
- Wahat Al Karama

== United Kingdom ==
- Amersham Martyrs Memorial, Amersham, Buckinghamshire
- Marian Martyrs' Monument, Smithfield, London
- Martyrs' Memorial, Oxford
- Plaque commemorating Robert Ferrar, Nott Square, Carmarthen, Wales
- Martyrs' Monument, St Andrews, which commemorates Patrick Hamilton, Henry Forrest, George Wishart and Walter Milne
- Political Martyrs' Monument, Edinburgh
- Stratford Martyrs' Memorial

There are other memorials at Lewes in Sussex, and in other places.

== United States ==
- List of memorials to Abraham Lincoln
- List of memorials to Martin Luther King Jr.
- Armenian Martyrs Memorial in Providence, Rhode Island
- Civil Rights Memorial, Montgomery, Alabama
- Medgar and Myrlie Evers Home National Monument, Jackson, Mississippi
- Haymarket Martyrs' Monument, Forest Park, Illinois
- Prison Ship Martyrs' Monument, Brooklyn, New York City

== Uzbekistan ==
- Martyrs' Memorial (Tashkent)
