= Gallipoli Peninsula Historical Site =

Historical site in Gallipoli, Turkey

Coordinates: 40°10′13″N 26°22′04″E

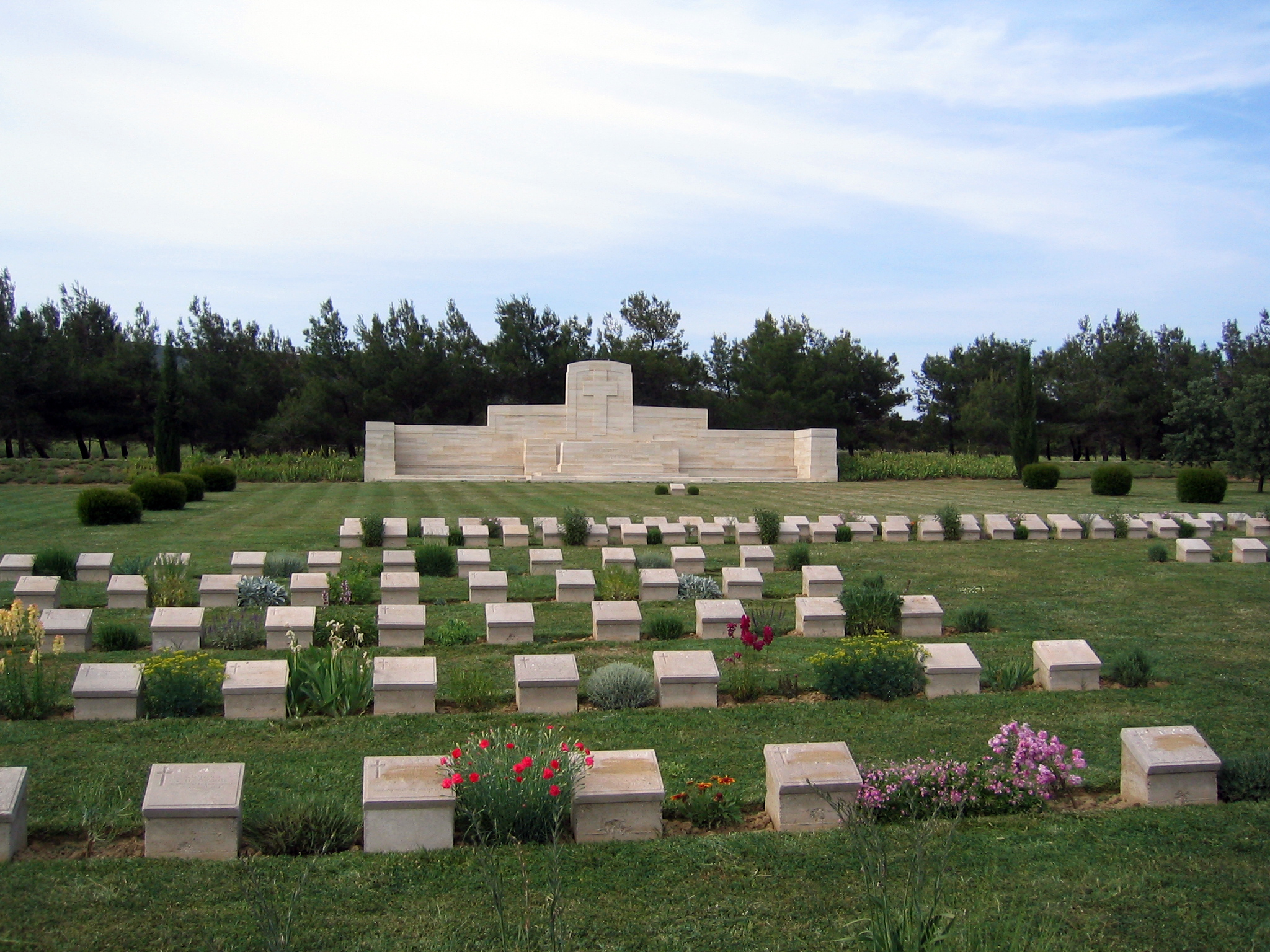
Azmak Cemetery, Gallipoli Peninsula

The Gallipoli Peninsula Historical Site covers over 33,000 hectares in Gallipoli, Turkey. The park was established in 1973 by the Turkish government and is included in the United Nations list of National Parks and Protected Areas. Gallipoli Peninsula Historical Site is home to memorials, graveyards, and commemorations of events that took place on the peninsula since the First World War.

In honor of over 500,000 soldiers who died in battle on Gallipoli, the Gallipoli Peninsula Historical National Park was established in 1973. In loving memory of the lives lost, the park consists of statues, memorials, and cemeteries. The surrounding area also provides scenic views of the Ariburnu Cliffs coupled with clear waters and beaches.

The Gallipoli Peninsula Historical Site is best known for the battles fought in the First World War. Most notably, the Canakkale Sea and shore battles fought in 1915. Various remnants can still be found at the park, such as building structures and sunken ships. The memorials remember soldiers from Turkey, England, France, Australia, and New Zealand. The Gallipoli peninsula and Gallipoli Campaign are especially significant in Turkish, Australian and New Zealand cultures due to the large percentage of each country's population who fought/ died during the war. Commonwealth war graves are cared for by the Commonwealth War Graves Commission.

The park is officially recognised as a historical site. In addition to its historical significance, the park also serves an important cultural significance. Countless archaeological findings have been discovered, many of which date back to 4000 BC. The combination of war history, ancient sites, and astounding scenery, has attracted thousands of visitors every year, making it one of the most famous sites in Turkey.

Because of the Gallipoli Peninsula Historical Site's distinct situation being located near three cultural zones, Anatolia, Balkans, and Aegean, it is isolated from each cultural zone's central area. This makes the park an accessible margin for all surrounding nations. In times of integration or distress, the park serves as a meeting ground for all three cultural zones.

== History ==
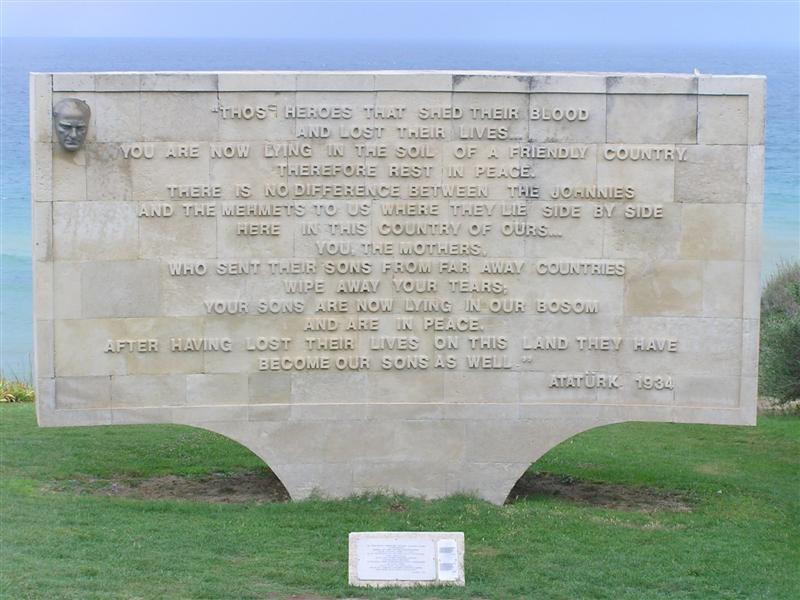
The memorial at Anzac Cove, commemorating the loss of Ottoman and Anzac soldiers on the Gallipoli Peninsula

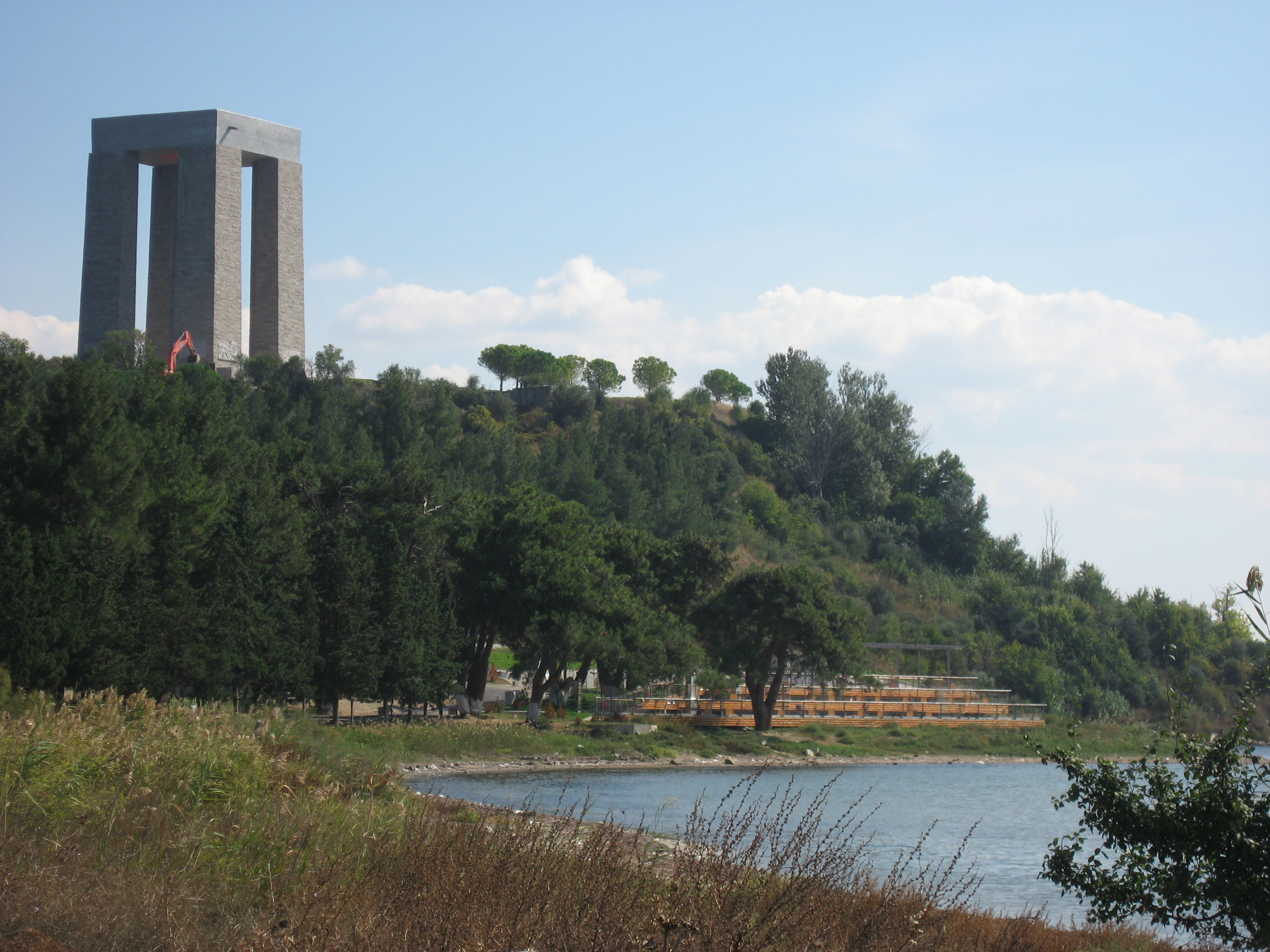
Çanakkale Martyrs' Memorial

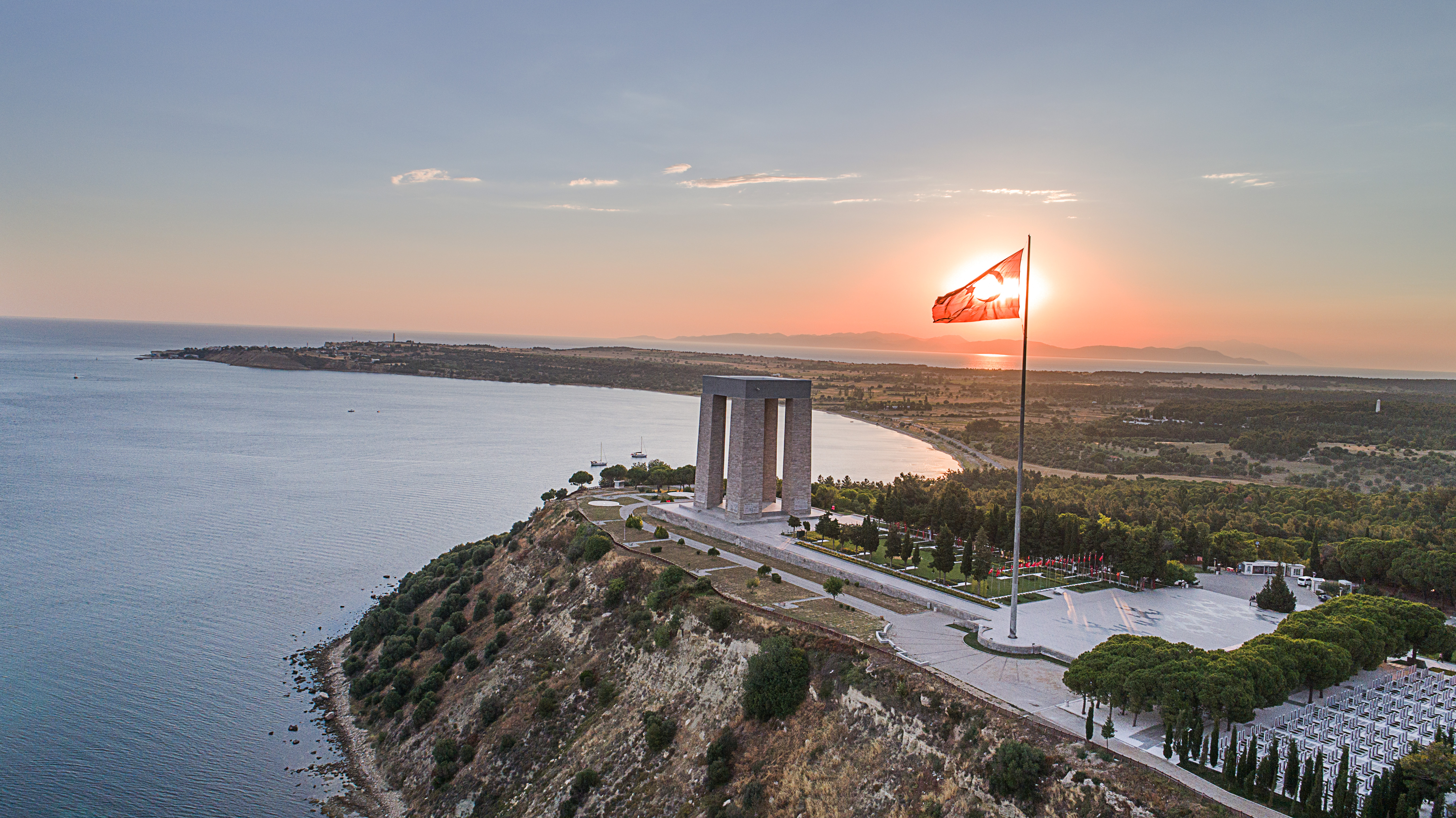
Çanakkale Martyrs' Memorial

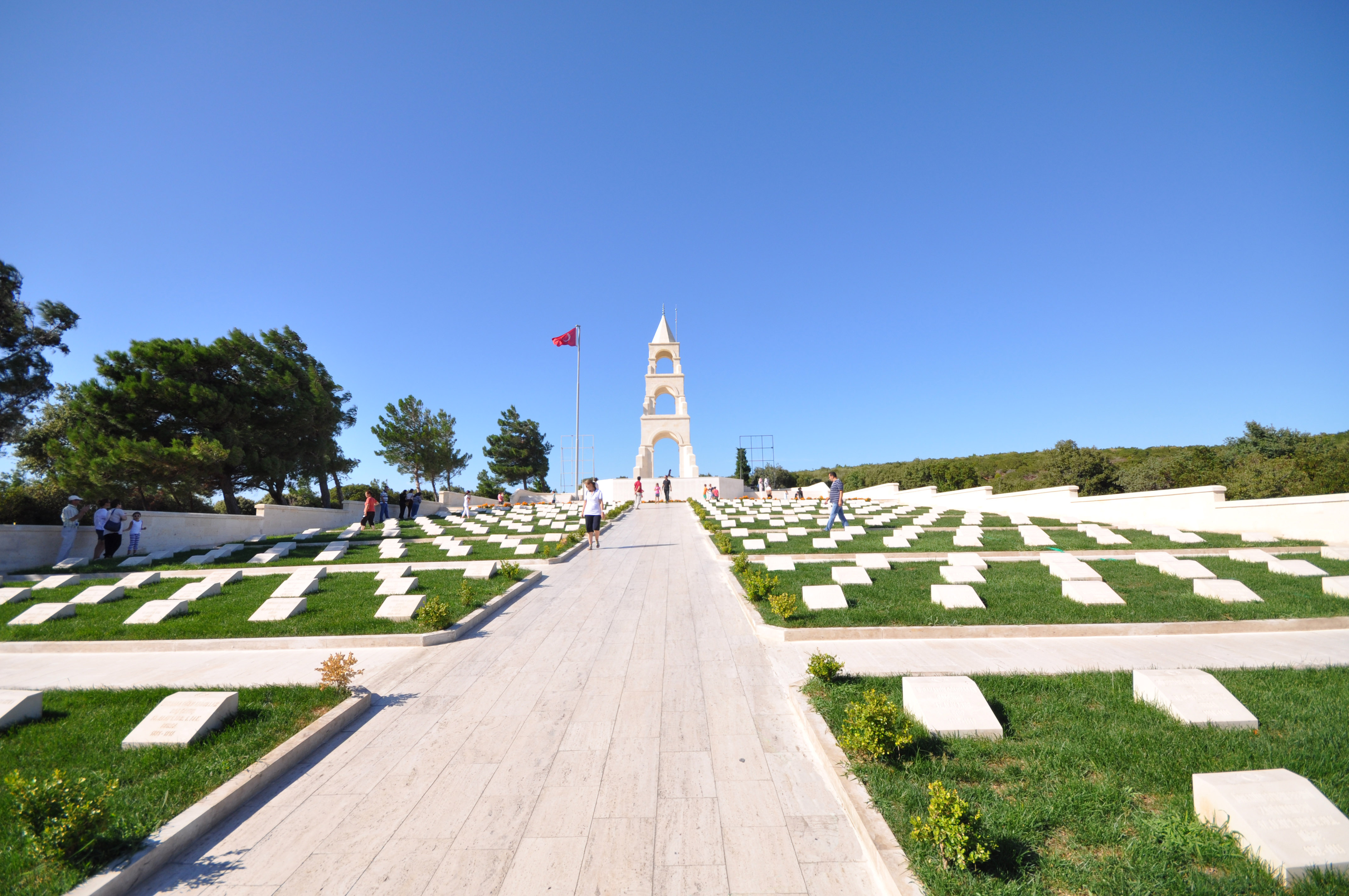
57.Alay Şehitliği (57th Regiment) – Turkish memorial and cemetery in Gallipoli

=== 1914–1918 ===
The Gallipoli Peninsula is filled with rich history since World War One. In 1914, conflicts between the Allied forces and the Ottomans began. The invasion of the Gallipoli Peninsula, which is known to have started the Gallipoli Campaign in World War One, is also known as Anzac Day. ANZAC day, 25 April 1915, is commemorated by Australians and New Zealanders due to the numerous lives lost.

Allied forces entered the Gallipoli Peninsula with the plan of creating a new front in the east. This front was meant to create easy access to supplies from Russia and the Mediterranean Sea. Leaders such as Winston Churchill, and Lord Kitchener supported the strategy to attack the Gallipoli Peninsula. This attack failed and hundreds of thousands of people died. Although exact numbers are still unknown, it is estimated that the total number of casualties reached half a million.

Although the dead were buried and commemorated during the war, the Ottomans and Allied forces both began a more coordinated effort in 1918. Today, there are 31 cemeteries and six commemorative monuments on the land with 23,000 graves being individually marked.

=== 1973–present ===
After many proposals to create a national historical park on the peninsula, Gallipoli Peninsula National Historical Park became formal on 2 November 1973. The formation of the park came about by the Foundation for Turkish Nature Conservation (TTKD), the United States National Park Service (USNPS), the State Planning Organisation in Turkey, and the Turkish National Parks Department.

Once the park opened, several plans for commemorative projects to be held in the Gallipoli Peninsula National Historical Park were made. Besides the Çanakkale Martyrs Memorial, architects tried to create as little impact on unsettling the land as possible. Even though this was the main goal, it is evident through the structures on the sight today that many structures interfered with the framework of the land.

In 1994, a fire in the Ariburnu (ANZAC Cove) region of the peninsula resulted in the ruin of 4,049 hectares of forest. This fire sparked the Turkish government to create an inventory of the peninsula's natural and cultural resources. Along with this inventory, research and new development plans began. The project team of urban planners from the Middle East Technical University (METU), led by Prof. Dr. Raci Bademli, criticised the previous development which caused destruction of culturally valuable land and argued for a new plan. Part of this proposal was to name the peninsula a Peace Park. This label would result in less invasive development and maintaining the peninsula's landscape. "The International Gallipoli Peninsula Peace Park Ideas and Design Competition" was held in 1998, and was won by Lasse Brøgger and Anne-Stine Reine, Norwegian architects, whose project won awards for its innovation, but never was completed.

In 1998, Gallipoli Peninsula National Historical Park was named a World Heritage Site. A year after this, the Australian and New Zealand governments found their citizens having an increasing interest in visiting the park. This sparked the proposal for an ANZAC commemorative site and yearly ceremony. The Australian and New Zealand governments created a 1.2 million dollar plan to create a new commemorative cite. At the same time, the Turkish government pledged 100 million dollars to improve the infrastructure of the land.

What was meant to be a coordinated project between Australia, New Zealand, and Turkey, became a series of disagreements. The disaster of the arguments caused disruption in the landscape, cultural heritage, and even human remains. Although it was the result of disagreements between all countries involved, the Australian government admitted its faults.

In 2005, more projects commemorating the events during the First World War began. New Turkish cemeteries were discovered and therefore were developed for public view. More parking lots and wider roads for tourist buses were also created to increase tourism infrastructure.

== Geography and landscape ==
The landscape design of the Gallipoli Peninsula Historical National Park was disputed between hundreds of architects since the end of World War I. As stated by architect Tony Watkins, "A visit to Gallipoli has the potential to change people, who they are, and how they see the world. A visit has the potential to lift them up so that they might see beyond their existing horizons. This is no ordinary place. The strong Gallipoli landscape has a great deal to say. A 5,000 years history."

Gallipoli is located in Thrace, Turkey, and is bordered by the Aegean Sea on its west and the Dardanelles strait on its east. The Gallipoli peninsula is located on the European part of the country and is known for its rich history from even before World War I. The peninsula stretches around 60 kilometres southwest into the Aegean Sea and is one to two kilometres wide at any given point.

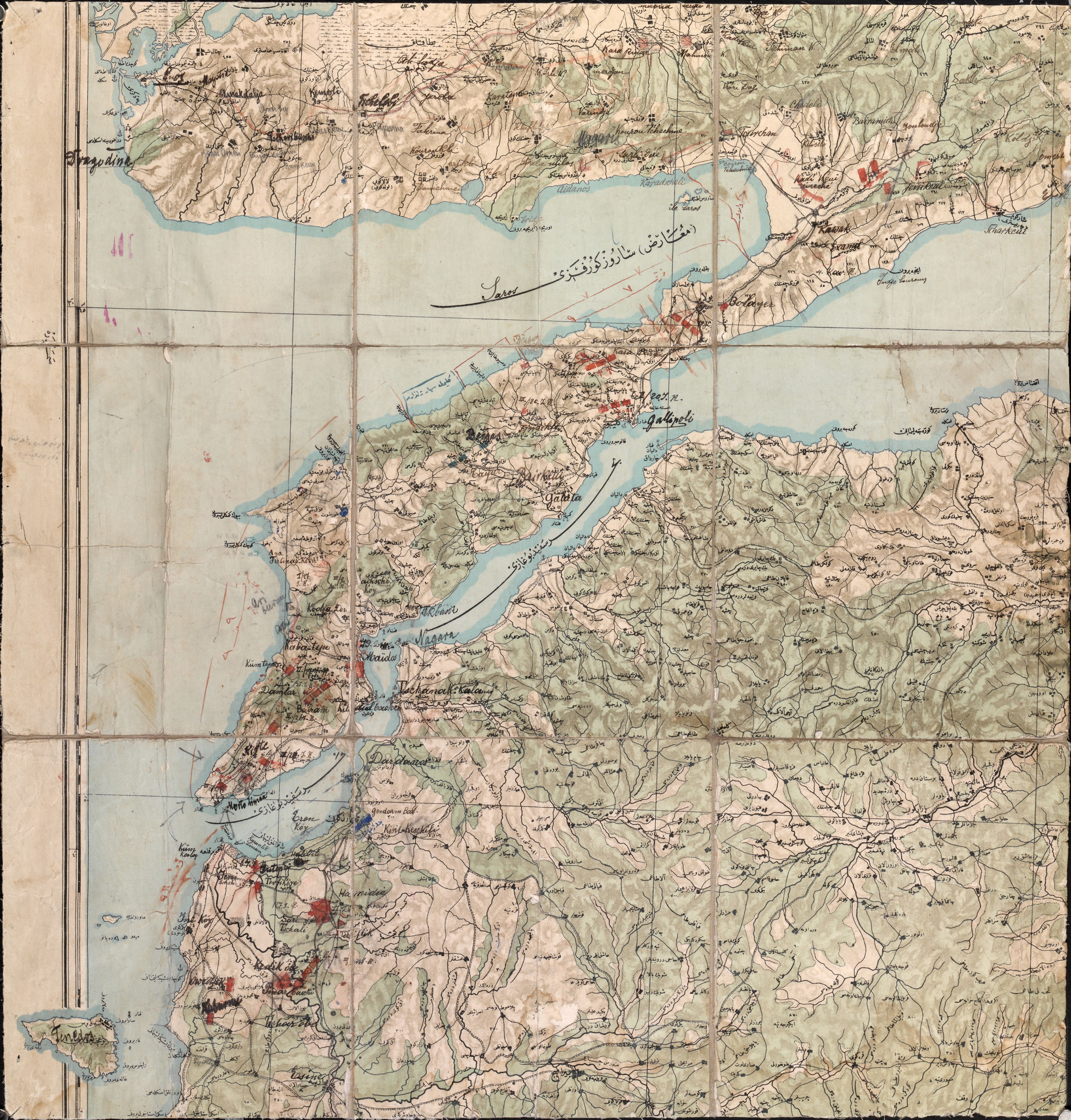
Battle of Gallipoli – map of Turkish dispositions, April 1915.

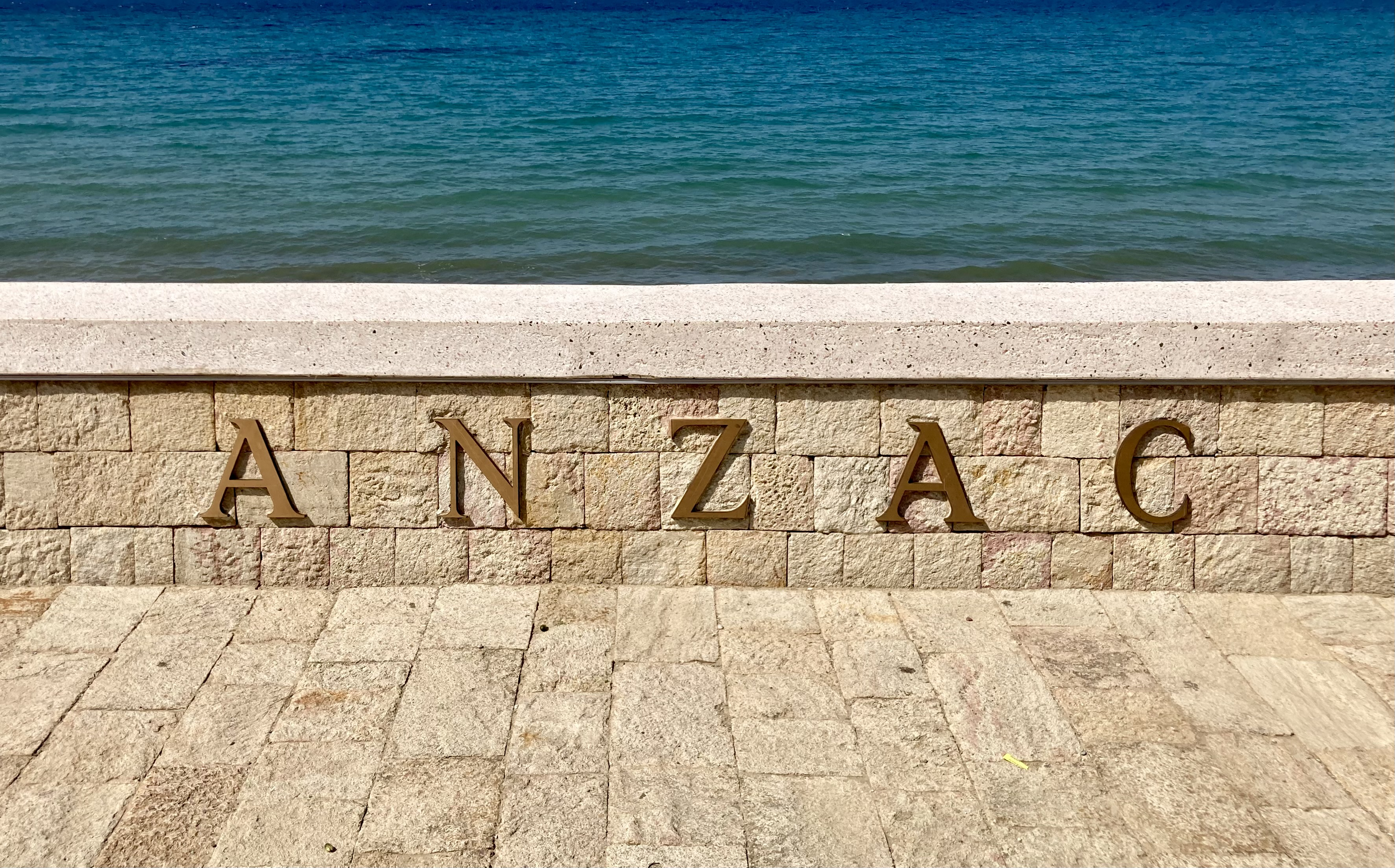
Anzac commemorative site, Gallipoli.

== Sites ==
As a part of the "Gallipoli Peninsula Historical National Park Long-Term development Plan", the names of 60,000 soldiers were written on 1,670 concrete slabs in commemoration of their deaths. This monument was built over 8,000 square meters of land. Along with the construction of the slabs, landscape designers also planted cypress trees to preserve the landscape and scenery of the land previously covered in asphalt. This grave site is one of many historically significant sites on the peninsula.

National heritage on the peninsula includes, 50 Turkish martyrs' cemeteries, 29 Turkish memorials and epigraphic monuments, 34 cemeteries and memorials, 6 fortresses, 14 bastions, 32 archaeological sites, and 36 underwater wrecks. The full list of war cemeteries and memorials on the Gallipoli Peninsula can be found here.

A popular pastime for Australian and New Zealand visitors on the Gallipoli peninsula is the 'ANZAC Walk'. This two-kilometre walk takes tourists through 11 of the areas in which the ANZACs were primarily located during the war. Audio tours and guides are also very popular in the national park.

=== Russell's Top ===
Russell's Top is a stretch of plateau which, for a portion of the Gallipoli Campaign, served as the northern front line of the ANZACs. The plateau is full of a series of trench systems which are still clearly visible today. At the north-western end of the plateau is the Nek. The Nek was held by the Ottoman-Turks and is a link to the Second Ridge. The Second Ridge was also held by the Allies but was never joined with Russell's Top due to the Turkish control of the Nek.

Currently, there have been issues with tourists creating their own walking tracks through the trenches, disturbing the historical significance of the land. Very few artefacts were located, but barbed wire, small ceramic pieces, and small metal food containers were found sticking out of the land. Most of the elaborate trench system is known to have existed but can no longer be found with the remaining areas displaying the consequences of erosion.

=== Turkish Quinn's ===
Across from Quinn's Post, which was held by the ANZACS, is Turkish Quinn's. Turkish Quinn's was a post controlled by the Ottoman Turks. From the first day of the Gallipoli Campaign, the Turks were able to hold this site until the Allied Forces retreated from the peninsula. The Turkish and ANZAC trenches, at certain points in the area, had less than 5 metres between them. During the Gallipoli Campaign, both sides believed these trenches to be the most unsafe spots on the peninsula.

The outlines of the trenches at Turkish Quinn's are still highly visible. The site is now covered with new growth and shrubs. Although the outlines of the trenches are clear, the trenches are mostly filled. This is a result of the Turks' decision to come back to the war zone and distribute unburied bodies in the trenches. As of 2005, no artefacts have been found in the area. There is a tourist access road between Turkish Quinn's and Quinn's that would likely have resulted in the removal of surface level artefacts. This area, is what was known as the "killing zone of no mans land".

=== German Officers' Trench ===
Similar to Turkish Quinn's, the outlines of the battle areas of German Officers' Trench are still highly visible. The site was given this name due to the position of two German soldiers directing troops on the first day of the Gallipoli Campaign. There were no artefacts found at this site, but trenches were again, backfilled.

=== Turkish trenches at Lone Pine ===
The Turkish trenches at Lone Pine were a part of the Turkish front line. Originally, they were meant to be reserve trenches, but after the August Offensive and the Australian advance on the main front lines, the Lone Pine trenches took their place.

In a preliminary archaeological survey of the battlefield, the site was found to have clear complex trench systems still in place with minimal erosion and backfilling. Similar to the other sites on the peninsula, metal cans and small ceramic pieces were of the few artefacts found in the area.

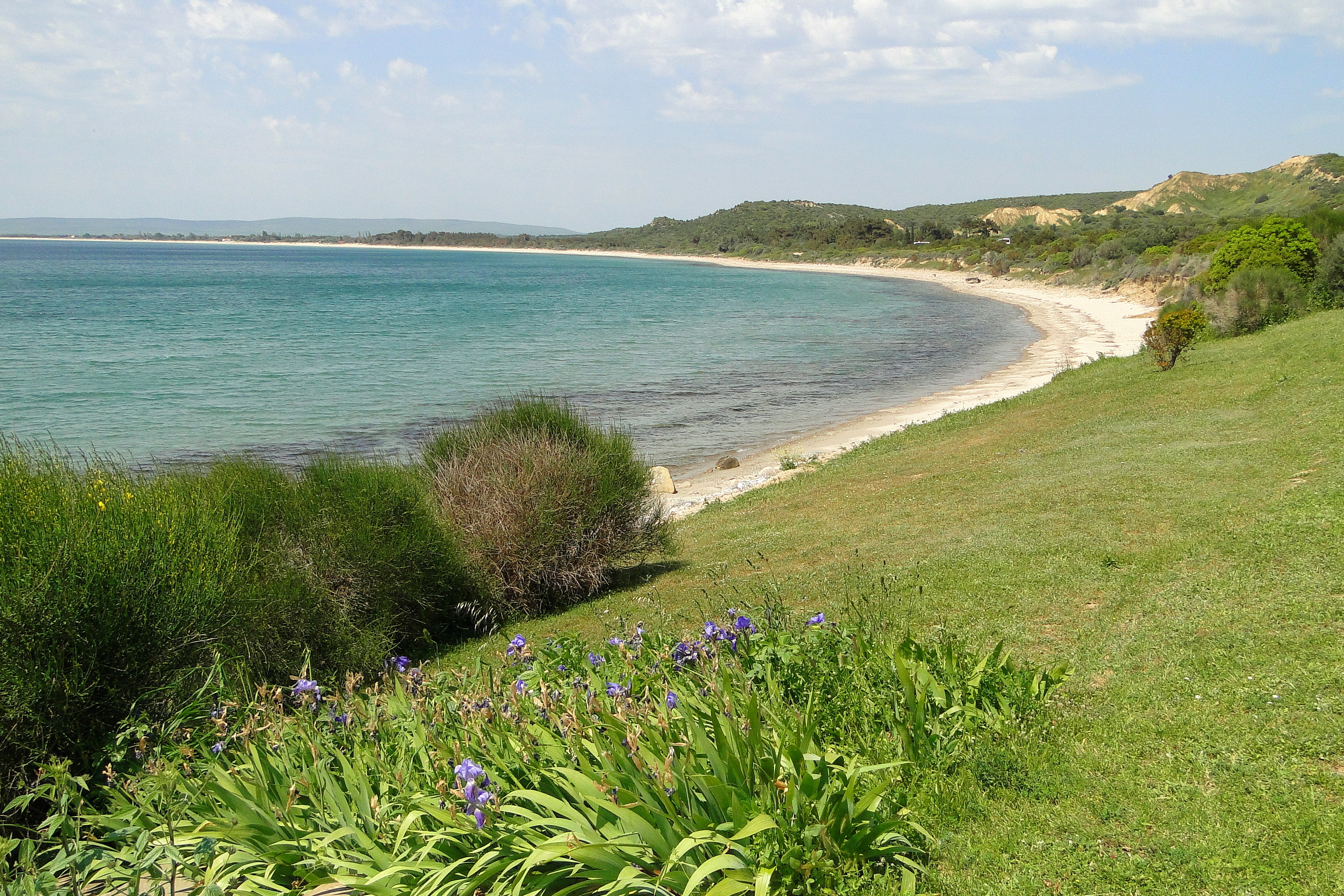
View of Anzac Cove, Gallipoli Peninsula, 2011

== Future ==
The Gallipoli Peninsula Historical Site is not only a place for the commemoration of the lives lost during World War I, but a possible location for ecotourism. The park's "war history, biological diversity, coastal morphology, and climate" all have potential to attract visitors.

The Çanakkale Wars and Gallipoli Historic Region Directorate (ÇATAB) controls the administration and long-term planning for the Gallipoli peninsula. Their goal is to "Develop as an open-air museum the Gelibolu (Gallipoli) Historical Area, where we paid the price during the Çanakkale Wars for our national unity and togetherness; to protect this historical area's emotional, historical, and cultural values, along with its nature, using a universal perspective, a sense of responsibility for the future generations, and cooperation with the veteran villages".
