= Erbil Marathon =

Annual Marathon in Iraqi Kurdistan

- Date: October
- Location: Erbil, Kurdistan Region, Iraq
- Event type: Road
- Distance: Marathon
- Established: 2011
- Website: Erbil Marathon

The Erbil Marathon is an annual marathon in Erbil, Kurdistan Region. The first marathon was held in 2011. The finish line is in Sami Abdul Rahman Park. athletes from around the world come and participate in the Marathon, it's held every October, every year.

== Results ==
Key: Course record 2015: 21km, 2017: 10km/5km

Edition	Year	Men's winner	Time (h:m:s)	Women's winner	Time (h:m:s)
1st	2011	Rawand Ali Ahmed (IRQ)	2:48:00	Dalia Ahmed (IRQ)	n/a
2nd	2012			Caitlin Hurley (USA)	3:21:00
3rd	2013	Vincent Cheruiyot (KEN)	2:33:49	Bornes Kitur (KEN)	3:25:18
—	2014	Did not held			
4th	2015	Muhammad Waisy (IRQ)	n/a	Bashri Rauf Saleh (IRQ)	n/a
5th	2016	Veysi Aslan (TUR)	2:52:25	Frida Södermark (SWE)	3:33:25
–	2017	Marathon race was cancelled due to flight ban, only the 10km & 5km races took place.			
6th	2018	Anton Lindholm (SWE)	3:07:02	Katherine Dutko (USA)	3:58:05
7th	2019	Isaac Prop (KEN)	2:25:02	Faith Kiptoo (KEN)	3:08:15
