= Siege of Şebinkarahisar =

Coordinates: 40.2848°N 38.4292°E

Siege of Sebinkarahisar
- Part of the Ottoman–Aq Qoyunlu Wars
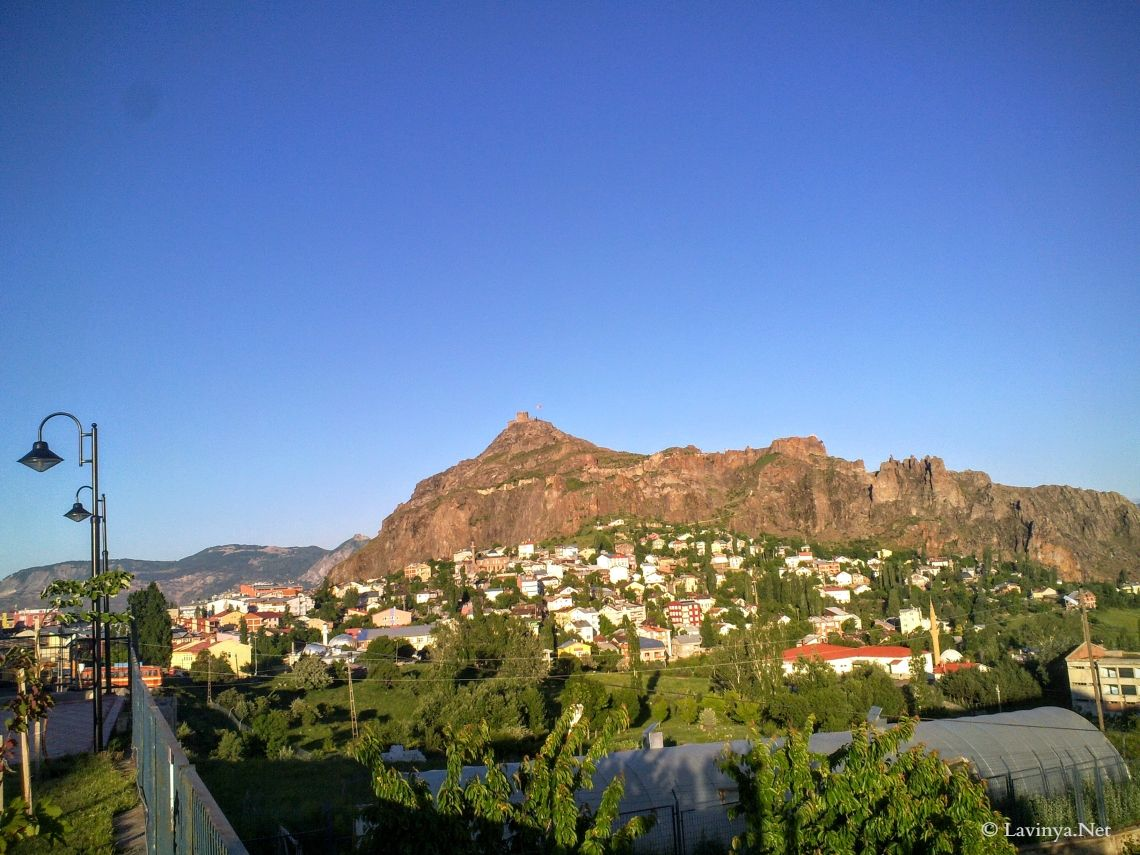
- Sebinkarahisar and its castle today
Date	24–29 August 1473
Location	Şebinkarahisar, Giresun, Turkey
Result	Ottoman victory

Belligerents
Ottoman Empire	Aq Qoyunlu

Commanders and leaders
Mehmed II	Dagrap Bey (surrendered)

The siege of Sebinkarahisar, is a siege that Mehmed II made upon his return from the Otlukbeli Campaign against Aq Qoyunlu's forces.

Mehmed II, who returned victorious from his campaign against Aq Qoyunlu ruler Uzun Hasan in the east in 1473, came to Sebinkarahisar on 24 August and besieged the castle. After the Aq Qoyunlu army suffered a great defeat in Otlukbeli and it was certain that no support force would come, Dagrap Beg, who did not see the need to resist, surrendered on 29 August. Dagrap Beg, who surrendered, was taken into Ottoman service and given the Ormenio Sanjakbeylik in Edirne. Mehmed, who left a garrison of about a thousand soldiers in the castle, returned to Istanbul.
