= Wahat Al Karama =

Monument in Abu Dhabi

- واحة الكرامة
- United Arab Emirates
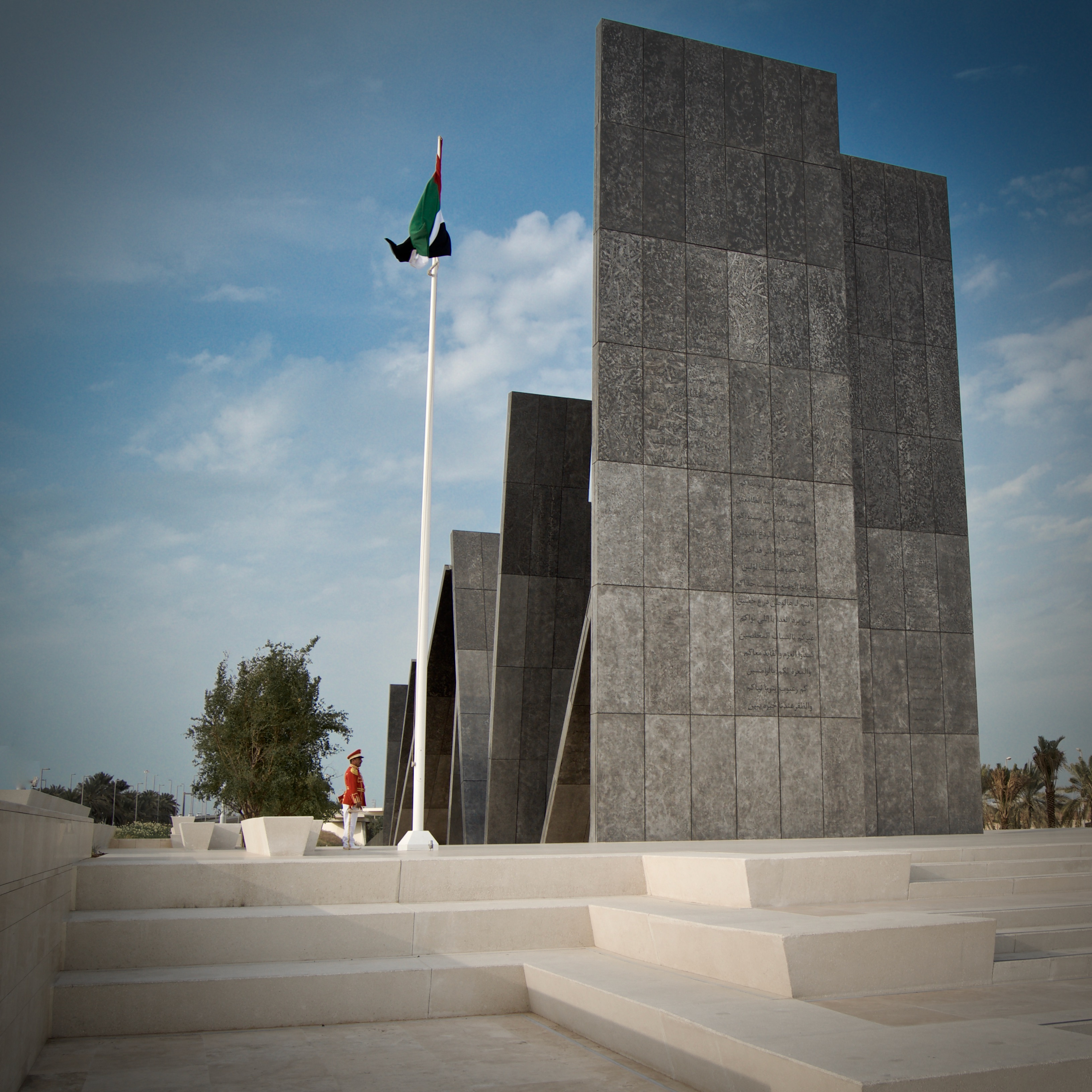
- Leaning pillars of Wahat Al Karama
- For all Emirati's killed in action (1971-present)
- Unveiled: 30 November 2016
- Location: 24°24′48.47″N 54°28′43.6″E
- Designed by: Idris Khan

Wahat Al Karama (Arabic: واحة الكرامة), which is also known by its English translation Oasis of Dignity, is a war memorial and monument in Abu Dhabi, United Arab Emirates located across Sheikh Zayed Grand Mosque to commemorate all Emiratis who are killed in the line of duty. The memorial was unveiled on the United Arab Emirates Commemoration Day on 30 November 2016. The memorial is composed of three structures: the leaning pillars, the pavilion of honor, and the memorial plaza. The names of all Emirati soldiers who are killed in duty are inscribed in the pavilion of honor.

British artist Idris Khan was commissioned to deliver this artwork as the centerpiece of the new United Arab Emirates Memorial Park in Abu Dhabi.

== History ==
The memorial is the first war memorial in the United Arab Emirates (UAE) and documents the names of all the fallen Emiratis who were killed in the line of duty. The first name is of a 20-year-old policeman, Salem Suhail bin Khamis, who declined to lower the Ras Al Khaimah flag in the Greater Tunb and was killed in the Seizure of Abu Musa and the Greater and Lesser Tunbs. The date of his death is marked as the UAE's commemoration day.

Members of the Federal Supreme Council gather in the site annually on commemoration day on 30 November in a ceremony honoring the fallen soldiers. The site also sometimes serves as a meeting place for the Cabinet of the United Arab Emirates.

== Architecture ==
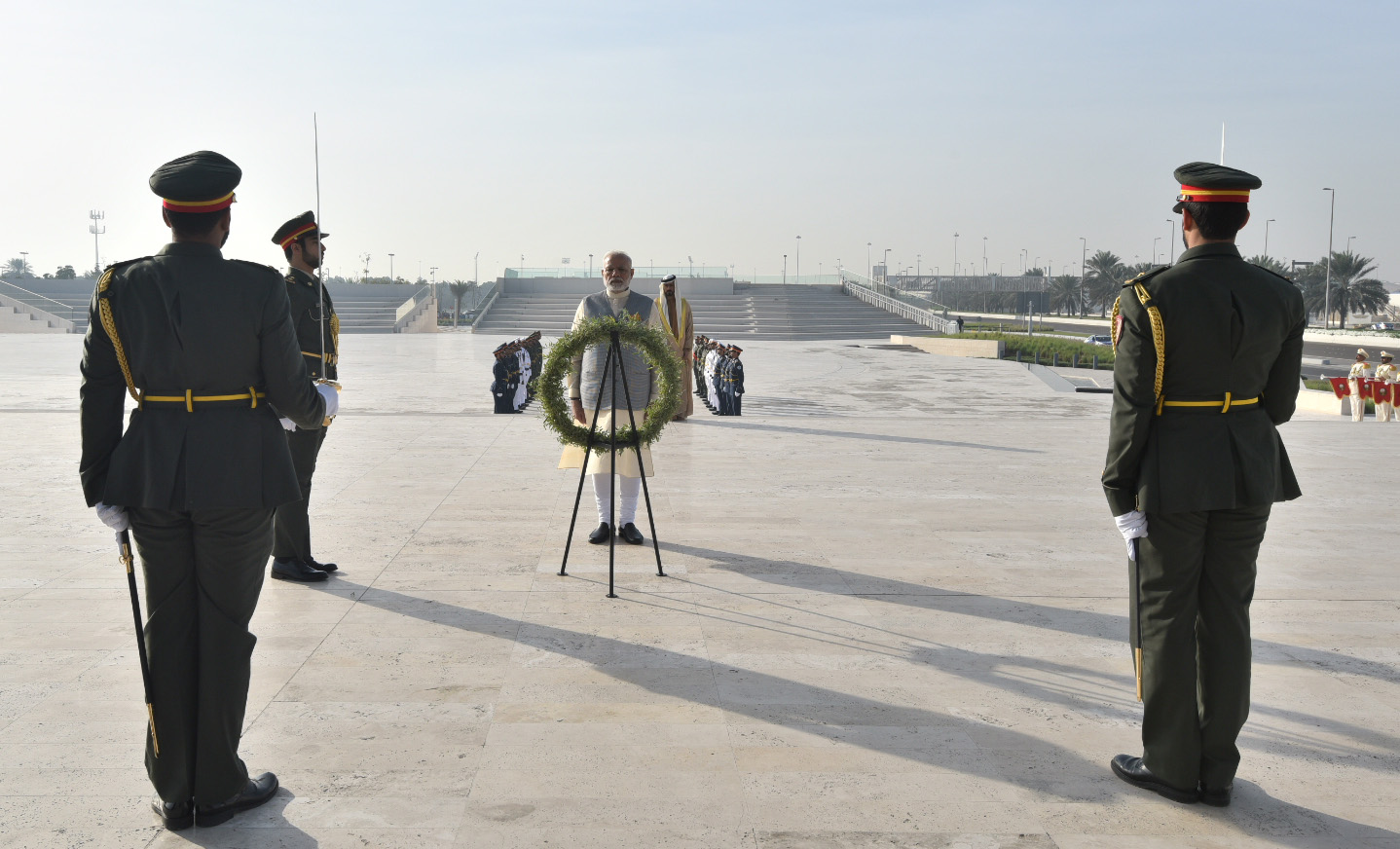
Indian Prime Minister Narendra Modi paying tribute to fallen Emirati soldiers during a visit to Abu Dhabi in 2018.

The memorial is a 46,000-square-meter site opposite the Sheikh Zayed Grand Mosque. This project was produced in collaboration with UAP and Bureau Proberts.

=== Leaning Pillars ===
The Leaning Pillars are inscribed with the national pledge of the UAE and Arabic poems by UAE founding father Sheikh Zayed bin Sultan Al Nahyan, Late President Sheikh Khalifa bin Zayed Al Nahyan, prime minister Mohammed bin Rashid Al Maktoum, and Current President Mohammed bin Zayed Al Nahyan.

== See also ==
- List of martyrs' monuments and memorials
