= Battle of Otlukbeli =

Battle between the Aq Qoyunlu and the Ottoman Empire

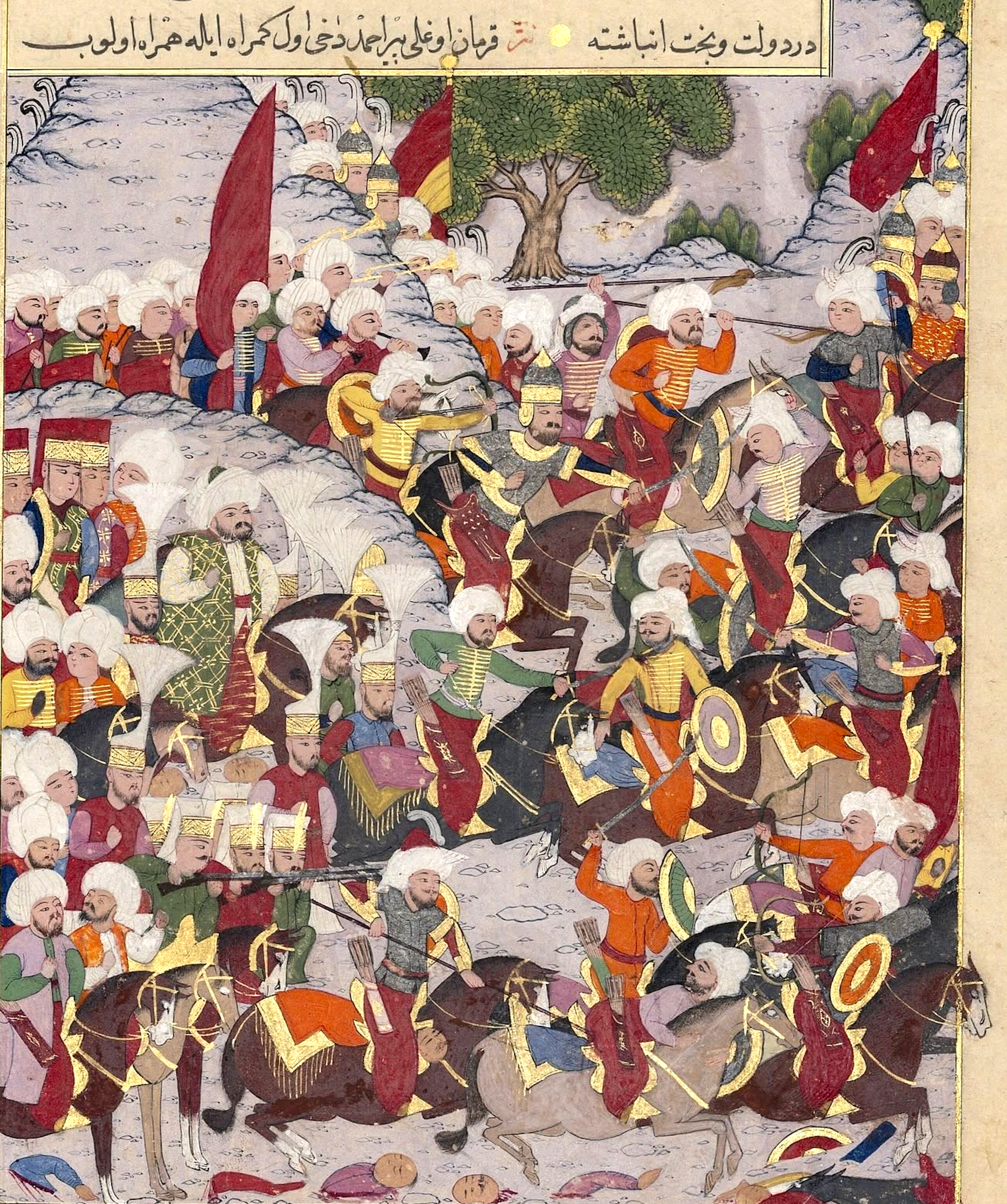
- 17th century Ottoman miniature depicting the battle
| Date | 11 August 1473 |
| Location | Otlukbeli, Erzincan, Turkey 39°58′25″N 40°01′20″E |
| Result | Ottoman victory |

Belligerents
| Ottoman Empire | Aq Qoyunlu; Timurids |

Commanders and leaders
| Mehmed II; Şehzade Mustafa; Şehzade Bayezid; Davud Pasha; Gedik Ahmed Pasha; Mahmud Pasha; Mihaloğlu Ali Bey | Uzun Hasan; Ughurlu Muhammad; Zayn-al-Abidin Mirza †; Gâvur İshak; Pir Mehmed Bey (POW); Pir Ahmed; Mirza Mehmed (POW); Mirza Zeynel (POW); Mirza Muzaffer (POW) |

Strength
| 70,000–100,000 or 85,000 (60,000 armored soldiers, 25,000 Janissaries) | 70,000–300,000 or 200,000 (mostly cavalry) |

Casualties and losses
| 4,000 | 55,000 |

The Battle of Otlukbeli was fought between the Aq Qoyunlu and the Ottoman Empire on 11 August 1473.

== Background ==
In autumn of 1463, the Republic of Venice opened negotiations with Uzun Hasan. In 1464, Uzun Hasan intervened in central Anatolian affairs. Although Mehmed occupied Karaman in 1468, he was unable to subjugate a number of Turkoman tribes living in the mountains which extended to the Mediterranean coast. These tribes were not subdued for the next fifty years, and from time to time rose in revolt around pretenders to the throne of Karamanids. After the Ottoman occupation of Karaman, Uzun Hasan adopted a more aggressive policy. By 1471, the problem of Karaman had become a serious threat to the Ottoman power. Uzun Hasan formed alliance with the Venetians and established contacts with the Knights of Rhodes, Kingdom of Cyprus and the Bey of Alaiye. He also intended to establish a direct contact with Venice by marching on the Mediterranean coast through the Taurus Mountains, then controlled by the Turkoman tribes. Although a few Venetian ships landed on the coast, they could not find Uzun Hasan's men. In 1472, a crusader fleet attacked the Ottoman coasts. Uzun Hasan with Karamanid forces drove the Ottomans from Karaman and marched on Bursa. However, Mehmed repulsed the invasion, and formed an army of 70,000 men. In addition to his regular army, he had mercenaries from his Muslim and Christian subjects.

== Letters and developments ==
At this time when the war preparations began, Uzun Hasan increased his courage and sent a letter to the Ottomans, asking for Cappadocia and Trabzon to be given to him. Thereupon, in a letter sent by the sultan to Uzun Hasan:

Before this, you were saved from my wrath by your mother's request. We accepted you as having found the right path and forgave you. However, it is forbidden for an unbelieving Turkmen like you to claim sultanate and independence in my time. It was because we ignored the pride and grandeur you showed in your own land, and even all your power and enthusiasm, that you overcame a few like yourself through violence. Despite this, we are aware that he tortured people by forgetting about my privacy and living comfortably under my just will by sending soldiers to Tokat and then to Karaman countries. That's why we decided to move in the spring of this year to kill you and destroy your country. Forgiving you is definitely not considered. Don't bother in vain. Do you think that destroying provinces is sultanate? Our sword must be stained with blood on your chest because you violated our lands without hesitation or fear. Come to the square if you are brave. Don't go from one hole to another like a woman, make your preparations and don't say you weren't informed.

In this letter, Mehmed also informed Uzun Hasan when he would move. Mehmed, who had always taken care to hide his wars from even his closest friends, did the exact opposite this time. He did not hesitate to announce this not only to Uzun Hasan but also to others.

== Walking and battle ==
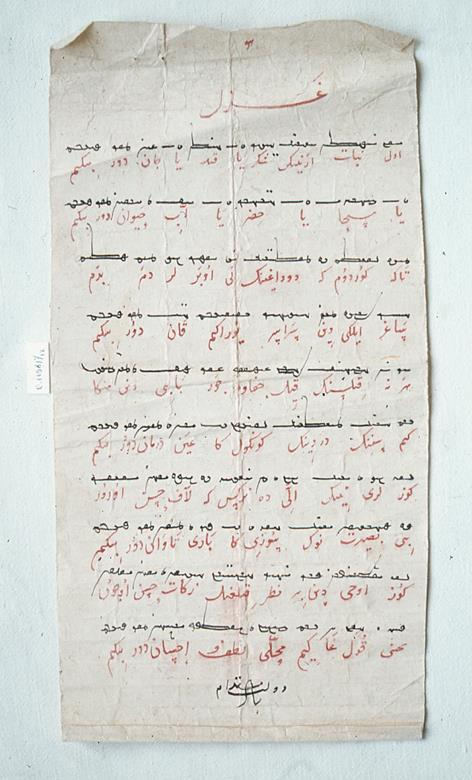
Mehmed the Conqueror's bilingual (Ottoman and Chagatai) Fetihname (Declaration of conquest) after the battle

Preparations for war began in all provinces of the Ottoman Empire. The Ottomans, who spent the autumn and winter of 1472 making preparations, decided on Bursa Yenisehir as the meeting place of the main army. The forces gathered from Rumelia passed to Anatolia from Gallipoli. Just as their collection was over, the sultan set out at the head of his forces in Istanbul and came to Yenişehir on 11 April 1473. The governor of Karaman, Prince Mustafa, and the governor of Amasya, Prince Bayezid, joined the army with their forces. In this way, the Ottoman army reached 85,000 people.

The army's arrival in Sivas created great satisfaction in the people of Sivas. But after that things got difficult. Because from now on, the army entered a very mountainous and steep terrain. While the high mountains were being crossed, the Ottoman army was caught in a snowstorm.

Even though the army traveled for more than 40 days, there was still no news from Uzun Hasan. However, Turkish raiders were attacked by Uzun Hasan's forces in Niksar. The Ottoman army, which threw them back, came to Koyulhisar and Şebinkarahisar, whose inhabitants had fled to the mountains, and after making some raids in this vicinity, came to Erzincan. Here Uzun Hasan's force of 5,000 men was encountered. But an Ottoman force of 5,000 men under the command of Turahanoğlu Ömer Bey defeated the Aq Qoyunlu. When it came to Tercan, many people who had taken refuge in the mountains came and surrendered to the Ottomans, who took booty and captives from them.

At this time, while the Ottoman army was marching eastwards following the Euphrates, Uzun Hasan's forces appeared on the opposite shores. But there were also some sandy shores in these places where the river widened. The Ottoman camp was established on the edge of one of them. Because it was estimated that Uzun Hasan's forces, encamped on the opposite shore, would pass back from one of these sandy places.

The Ottomans decided to cross without leaving time for this. Has Murad Pasha would pass through the gate first. However, since he was very young and enterprising, Mahmud Pasha became his companion. But a disagreement started between Mahmud Pasha and Has Murad Pasha. Because when Uzun Hasan's forces made a fake retreat in front of the Ottoman forces that crossed to the opposite shore, Mahmud Pasha, thinking that this was a trick, told Murad Pasha to stay in place. When Mahmud Pasha retreated against the enemy's superior forces, he could not find Murad Pasha where he left him. Because he had gone forward recklessly, deceived by the enemy's fake draw. The enemy was ambushed in several places. Their aim was to turn Murat Pasha's back, but on the other hand, Aq Qoyunlu made a fake retreat against Murat Pasha's forces. Murad Pasha could not understand the meaning of this and started to attack. Meanwhile, Uzun Hasan's forces, which surrounded him from behind, suddenly appeared and the retreating forces turned back. Murad Pasha now understood the situation. However, he had no choice but to fight. Murad Pasha's army had reached 3 hours in the face of superior forces. This victory was an important event for the Aq Qoyunlu. Because it caused a terrible demoralization on the Ottomans.

After this incident, Uzun Hasan and his forces disappeared again. That's why Mehmed headed towards Bayburt and although he traveled for 6 days, he did not receive any news from Uzun Hasan. However, on the seventh day, Wednesday 11 August 1473, they came to a place called Three Mouths around Tercan. This place was narrow and difficult to pass. Even the animals were no longer able to walk. Therefore, they had to camp and rest in this place, which was difficult to pass, narrow and surrounded by high mountains. Here, while the army was still out of order, some forces appeared on the hill called Otlukbeli at noon. These were the soldiers given to Uzun Hasan's command of Gavur İshak. Faced with this situation, the Ottomans immediately took action to establish war order. The task of countering Gavur İshak was given to Davud Pasha. Mahmud Pasha was also with these forces. Meanwhile, Uzun Hasan's forces held the Otlukbeli ridge and forced the Ottomans to accept the war there. Davud Pasha attacked Gavur İshak's forces with the Anatolian soldiers, preventing them from coming down the hill and connecting the roads. In the face of this attack, Gavur İshak retreated to join the main forces. Now Davud Pasha went to the plains with the Anatolian soldiers and took battle order. Opposite Davud Pasha were the forces of Zeynel Mirza, who commanded the right wing of Uzun Hasan's army. When they attacked Davud Pasha, a bloody war suddenly broke out on this plain. At this time, Mehmed and his Princes climbed the hill to reach the battlefield. Prince Mustafa managed to get to the plain a little later and fell on Zeynel's forces with all the Anatolian soldiers. Now a terrible war was taking place. When the Ottoman soldiers saw the Akkoyunlu soldiers coming down from the mountains like a flood, they had no difficulty in understanding what they were up against. On the right and left wings, 60,000 people began to harass Uzun Hasan's forces with all their efforts. The surroundings were not visible due to the dust rising from the ground. So many people and horses were dying that their blood flowed like a flood from the hills to the stream. Zeynel fell among the Ottoman soldiers and was killed. His severed head was sent to Prince Mustafa by Mahmud Agha, and Mustafa sent it to the Sultan. Thus, the right wing of Uzun Hasan's forces collapsed. The Ottoman forces advancing on Zeynel now attacked in the direction of Uzun Hasan. Uzun Hasan's other son, Uğurlu Mehmed, left the battlefield almost without fighting. Because when Prince Bayezid marched on Uğurlu Mehmed, Uğurlu Mehmed withdrew avoiding facing the Ottoman forces and Prince Bayezid started to fight with Mehmed Bakır's forces. Uğurlu Mehmed would prevent those who fled if the Ottoman army was defeated and returned, and if his father's forces were defeated, he would hit the Ottoman army from behind. But he could not fulfill his duty when he was confronted by the forces of Prince Bayezid. But he started to defend a stream between himself and the Ottomans. Uzun Hasan saw his son Zeynel die and his right wing collapse. He turned to Pir Ahmed, who was next to him, and shouted, "May the Karamanoğlu dynasty be ruined, what did I do with the Ottoman?" Seeing that the war was won, Sultan Mehmed mobilized the 25,000 janissaries he had with him. Seeing these on the battlefield, Uzun Hasan's hope was completely crushed. Uzun Hasan realized that it was unnecessary to resist and left the battlefield. In order to escape, Uzun Hasan had to resort to trickery and leave someone very similar to him, Pir Mehmed Bey, in his place. In this way, he provided himself with the opportunity to escape. Soon Pir Mehmed Bey was captured and Uzun Hasan's standard was brought to the presence of the sultan. The war became one-sided when Uğurlu Mehmed could not resist and started to run away. Aq Qoyunlu were running away and the Ottomans were killing them. If the Ottomans had not gone into plunder, almost none of the Aq Qoyunlu forces would have survived.

== Aftermath ==
Following the defeat of Uzun Hasan, Mehmed took over Şebinkarahisar and consolidated his rule over the area. From Şebinkarahisar he sent a series of letters announcing his victory, including an unusual missive in the Uyghur language addressed to the Turkomans of Anatolia.

The decree (yarlık) had 201 lines and was written by Şeyhzade Abdurrezak Bahşı on 30 August 1473:

Completed when Karahisar was reached on the date of eight hundred and seventy eight, 5th day of the month Rebiülahir, the year of the Snake.

Ibn Kemal made the following statement on the capture of Şebinkarahisar:

On Wednesday 24 August we, the Ottomans, marched to Şebinkarahisar. When we set up cannon and began to destroy the fortifications ... (the governor) Dara Bey came out, seeking peaceful surrender ... We did not remove the existing townspeople ..., but we left there one-thousand of our men with abundant supplies.

Abu Bakr Tihrani in the Kitab-i Diyarbakriyya:

When the Karahisar area became the accommodation place of countless armies, Darab Beg-i Purnak, the owner of that castle, took shelter in the castle. Rum (Ottoman) soldiers surrounded the castle. Darab Beg surrendered the castle out of fear of the Rums.

Ottomans nearly destroyed the power of the Aq Qoyunlu in the East. Aq Qoyunlu would later be destroyed completely by Ismail I, founder of the Safavid Empire. This victory would create a new enemy for the Ottoman Empire in the East. The race between the two empires ended with the fall of the Safavid dynasty from power in the 18th century.

== See also ==
- Battle of Otlukbeli Martyrs' Monument

== Primary sources ==
- Târîh-i Ebü’l-Feth, Tursun Beg
- Tevārīḫ-i Āl-i ʿOsmān, Aşıkpaşazade
- Tevārīḫ-i Āl-i ʿOsmān, Ibn Kemal
- Cihannümâ, Neşri
