= Sami Abdul Rahman =

Iraqi Kurdish politician (1933-2004)

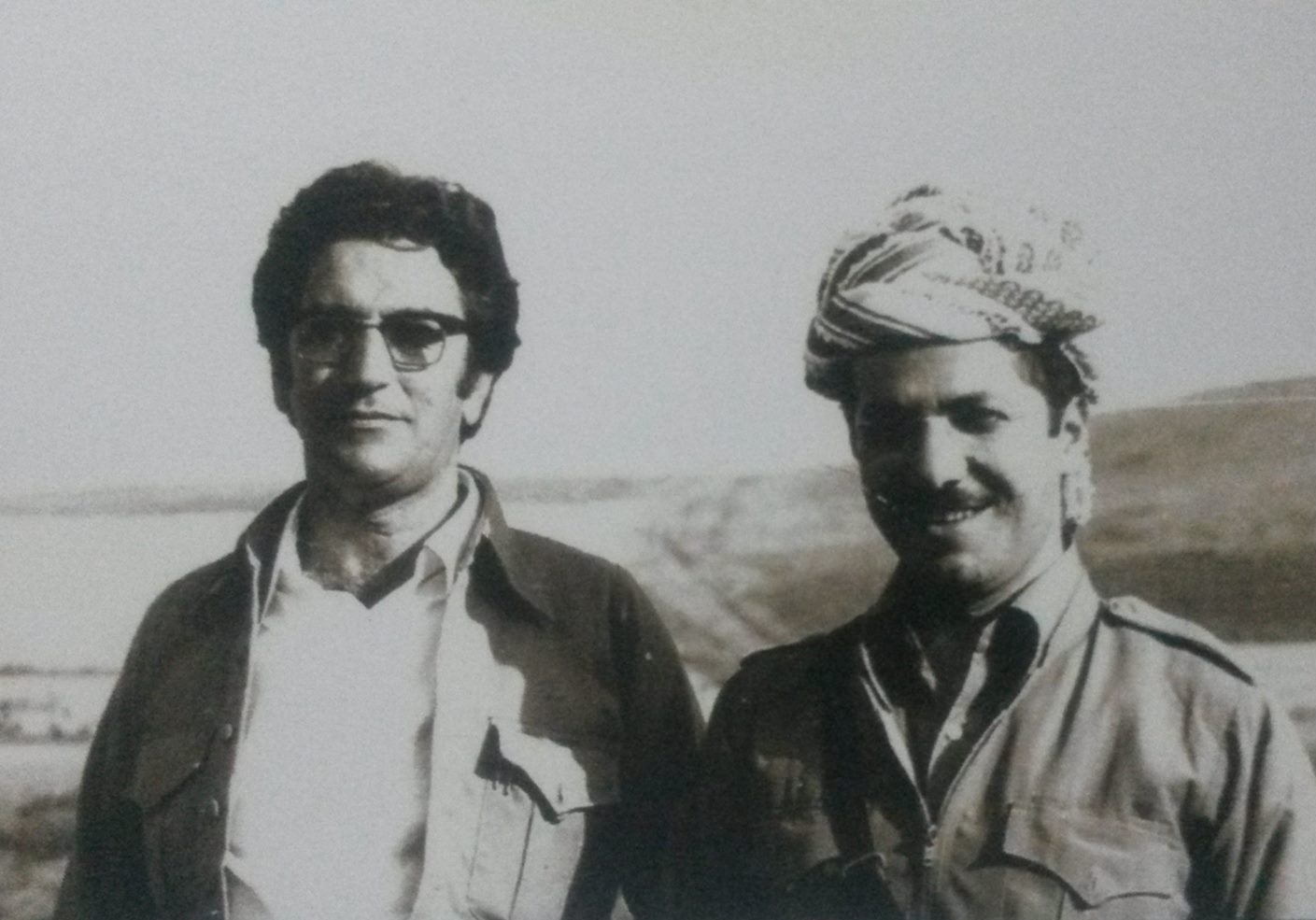
- Sami Abdul Rahman with Masoud Barzani, c. 1970s

Deputy Prime Minister of the Kurdistan Region (KDP-controlled area)
- In office 1999 – 1 February 2004
- Preceded by: Fazel Mirani
- Succeeded by: Position abolished

Personal details
- Born: 20 March 1932
- Died: 1 February 2004 (aged 71) Erbil, KDP headquarters, Iraqi Kurdistan
- Party: Kurdistan Democratic Party (Note: He joined the KDP twice, first leaving in 1981 to start his own party. He would later join back the KDP in 1993)
- Children: Bayan Sami Abdul Rahman

Sami Abdul Rahman (1933-2004) was a Kurdish politician and the deputy prime minister of the Kurdistan regional government. He campaigned to resolve inter-party conflict among Kurds. Rahman’s popularity came in 1969 after leading the bombardment of Iraqi held Oil fields in Kirkuk, inflicting significant damage. Rahman was one of the key Kurdish representatives during negotiations between Ba’athist Iraq and the Kurdish front in 1991.

In 1981 he left the Kurdistan Democratic Party, and formed his own Kurdistan Popular Democratic Party. He would later join back the KDP in 1993.

== Biography ==
He was born on 20 March 1932, on the borderlands between Iraqi Kurdistan and Syria. His family owned farms and orchards. For his secondary education, he went to the city of Mosul, in northern Iraq, and there won a government scholarship to go to Manchester University, where he graduated with a degree in engineering.

He was targeted under the rule of Saddam Hussein, Sami and his mother was sentenced to death for their political activities. Although both survived.

=== 1969 bombardment of Kirkuk Field ===
In 1969 Kurdish forces attacked the Kirkuk oilfields (then under Baathist Iraq). On 23 February, Sami Abdul Rahman launched an operation with a 200-man force. Masoud Barzani, then head of Kurdish intelligence (Parastin), supported the operation by spreading misinformation about a planned attack on Erbil, drawing Iraqi forces away from Kirkuk. The attack began shortly before 9 pm on 1 March 1969 at New Baba, near Kirkuk. The peshmerga fired an initial six mortar shells, followed by a sustained bombardment lasting about 90 minutes, with a total of 117 shells striking the oil facility. Rahman's team inflicted significant damage on the Iraqi Petroleum Company's oil installations.

=== Bradost ambush ===
In June 1978 Jalal Talabani sent Ali Askari with a force of 800 Peshmerga to pick up some guns in Turkey. Ali Askari’s force marched north, harried by Iraqi and Iranian air and ground forces. Short of ammunition by the time they reached Bradost, Askari contacted the KDP expecting no hostility. However, as his force entered Turkey, it was ambushed by KDP and tribal forces led by Sami (around 7,500 strong). The remainder under Askari surrendered after heavy losses. Both Askari and Khalid Said were later executed on Sami’s orders. Askari was executed by an RPG-7.

From 1999 to 2004, he was the deputy prime minister of the Kurdistan region until his death.

== Death ==
On February 1, 2004 Sami was one of six senior Kurdish government officials that was killed in a islamist suicide bombing at the headquarters of PDK and PUK. 101 people were killed in total. His elder son was also killed.

== In popular culture ==
There is a park named after him in Erbil. In 2024 it hosted 50,000 tourists from across iraq during Eid Al Adha.
