= Sami Abdul Rahman Park =

Public park in Erbil, Kurdistan Region, Iraq

- Parkî Samî Ebdul Rehman
- پارکی سامی عەبدولڕەحمان
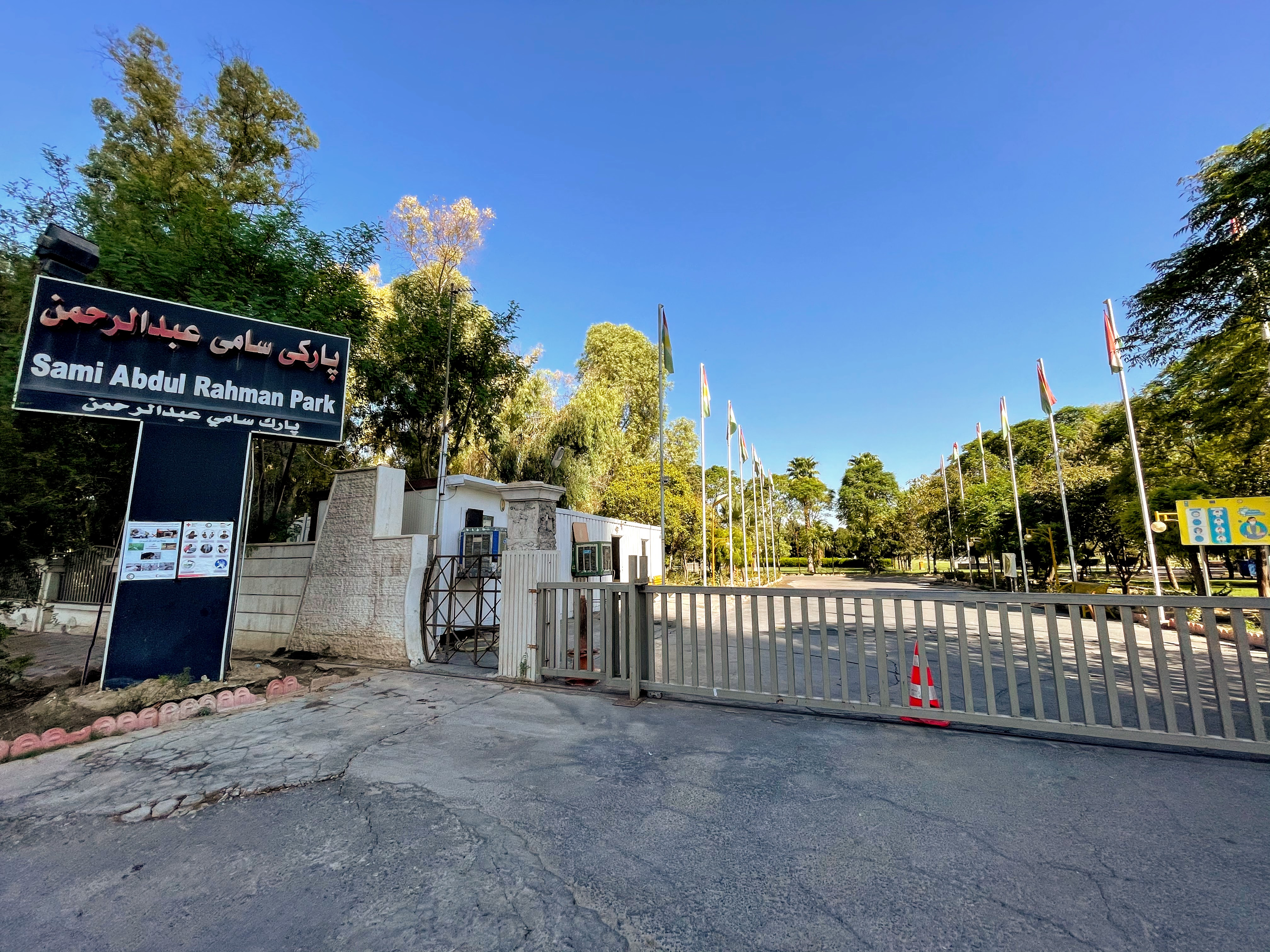
- One of Sami Abdul Rahman Park's gates
- Interactive map of Sami Abdul Rahman Park
- Type: Public park
- Motto: "Freedom is not free"
- Location: Erbil, Kurdistan Region, Iraq
- Nearest city: Erbil
- Coordinates: 36.191°N 43.984°E
- Area: 200 hectares (490 acres)
- Established: 2006
- Etymology: Named after Sami Abdul Rahman, former KRG Deputy Prime Minister
- Operator: KRG
- Open: Year-round
- Status: Open
- Water: Two lakes
- Plants: Rose garden
- Facilities: Restaurant, market, Martyrs Monument
- Other information: Finish line for the Erbil Marathon

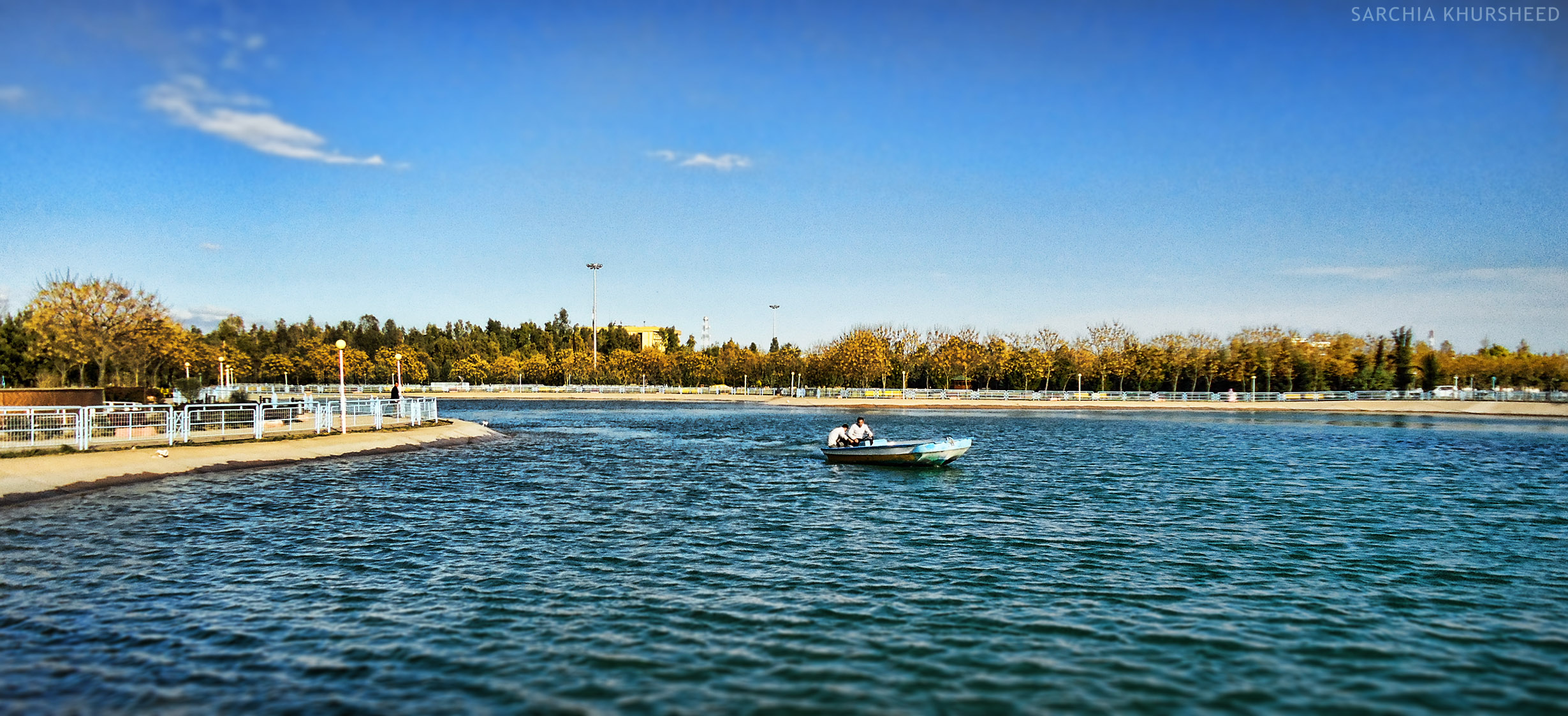
A lake inside Sami Abdul Rahman Park

Sami Abdul Rahman Park (Kurdish: پارکی سامی عەبدولڕەحمان, Parka Samî Ebdul Rehman) is a park in Erbil, Kurdistan Region in Iraq.

== History ==
The site was formerly the location of Saddam Hussein's 5th Corps Army military base. Construction of the park began in 1998, and it was completed the same year.

It is named after Sami Abdul Rahman, the Deputy Prime Minister of the Kurdistan Regional Government who was killed in a suicide bombing on 1 February 2004, aged 71.

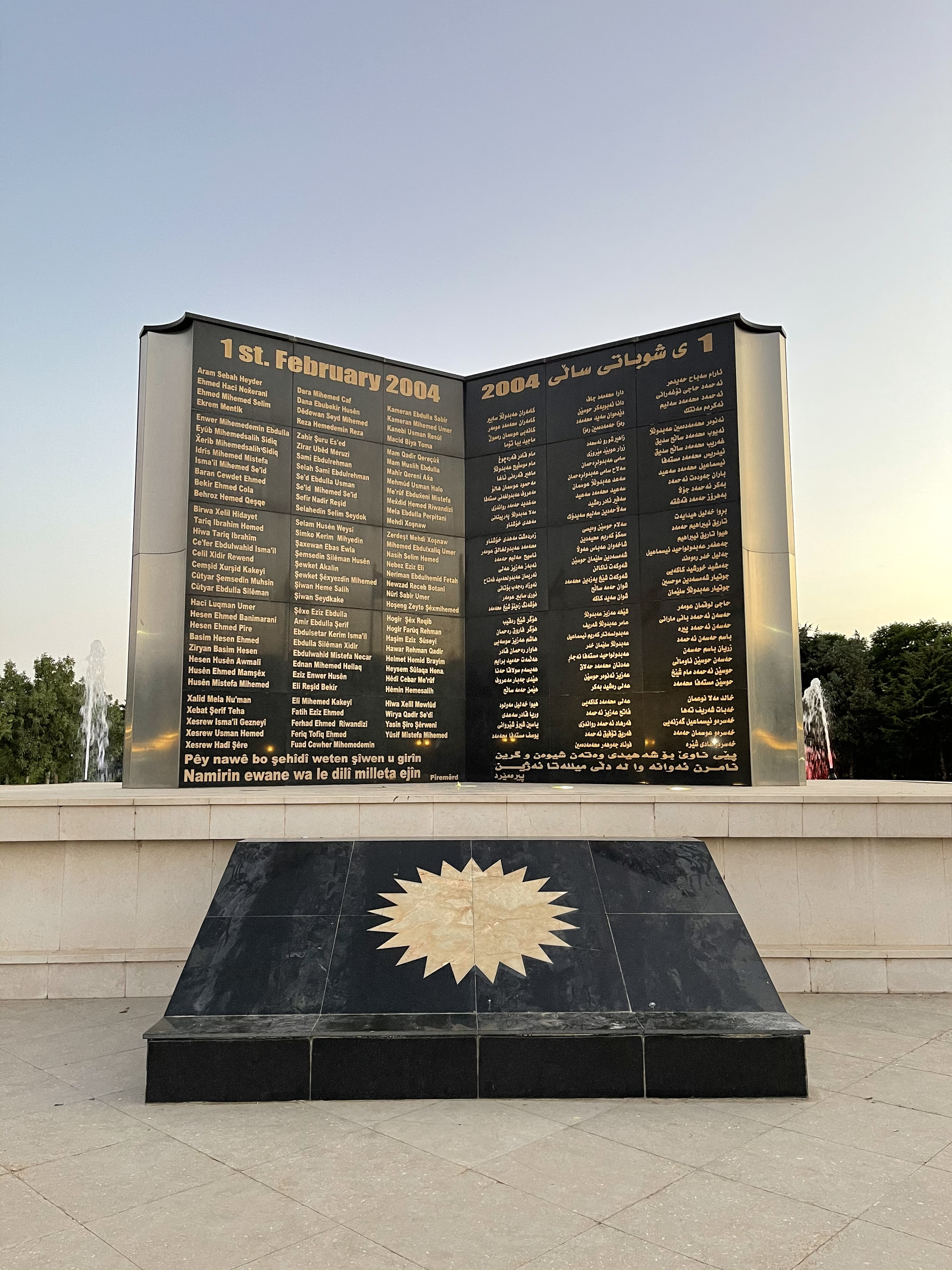
Memorial of the 2004 Erbil bombings in Sami Abdulrahman Park

== Features ==
The park is 200 hectares (2.0 km^{2}) in size and contains two lakes, a rose garden and the Martyrs Monument as well as a restaurant and market. It includes a monument with the inscription, "Freedom is not free."

The finish line of the annual Erbil Marathon is in the park.
