= Otlukbeli =

- Municipality
- Location in Turkey
- Coordinates: 39°58′25″N 40°01′20″E
- Country: Turkey
- Province: Erzincan
- District: Otlukbeli

Government
  - Mayor: Vahdet Ercan (AKP)
- Population (2021): 2,036
- Time zone: UTC+3 (TRT)
- Website: www.otlukbeli.bel.tr

Otlukbeli is a municipality (belde) and seat of Otlukbeli District of Erzincan Province in Turkey. It had a population of 2,036 in 2021. It is divided into the neighborhoods of Fatih, Mehmet Akif Ersoy and Şehitler.

== History ==
In 1835, the village of Karakulak (now the district center) was part of the Tercan District. The male population of Karakulak at that time was 0 Muslims and 78 non-Muslims.

== See also ==
- Battle of Otlukbeli
- Battle of Otlukbeli Martyrs' Monument
