= Bayan Sami Abdul Rahman =

Kurdish politician

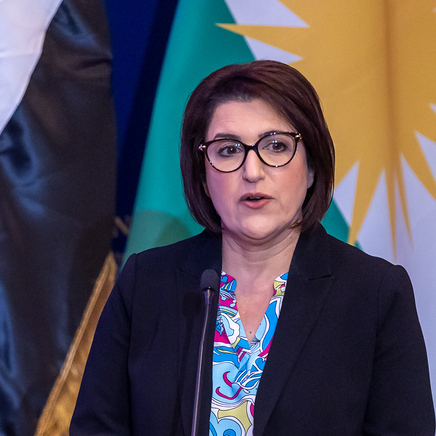
- Rahman in 2023
- Born: 1965 (age 60–61); Baghdad
- Occupation: Diplomat
- Known for: KRG representative to the UK and US
- Relatives: Sami Abdul Rahman

Bayan Sami Abdul Rahman is the former Kurdistan Regional Government High Representative to the UK, and former representative to the United States and a member of the Kurdistan Democratic Party. The Financial Times has described her as "an ambassador without a country."

Abdul Rahman grew up in Iraq until she fled as a refugee to London at the age of 11. She is the daughter of Sami Abdul Rahman, an important figure in the Kurdish resistance to Saddam Hussein. Her family needed to move frequently to escape the bombing by Saddam Hussein's military of Kurdish areas. She told The Telegraph that “We would be in one village and it would be bombed, so we’d have to flee. One time we lived in an empty school, another time in a shelter for nomads”.

After moving to Kent as a refugee, she won the Observer's Farzad Bazoft Memorial Prize in 1993 for her writing about Kurdistan in the Hendon Times.

After the fall of the Saddam regime, her father became Deputy Prime Minister of the KRG but he was killed along with his oldest son Salah and 96 other people in a double suicide bombing in Erbil in 2004.

Abdul Rahman was elected to the Leadership Council of the Kurdistan Democratic Party in 2010.

Abdul Rahman became a journalist for the Financial Times, and then a diplomat. She was made the KRG's representative in the UK, before moving to Washington, DC in 2015 to act as the KRG representative to the US.
