= Ali Askari =

Iraqi politician

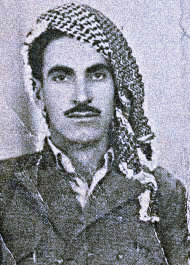
- Ali Askari in 1960s
- Born: Autumn 1936; Goptapa, Chamchamal District, Kurdistan, Iraq
- Died: Summer 1978; Hakkari, Turkey
- Cause of death: Execution
- Occupations: Politician, activist
- Known for: Politics, activism
- Political party: Patriotic Union of Kurdistan

Ali Askari (Sorani Kurdish: عەلی عەسکەری) (1936–1978) was a Kurdish politician, military leader, and revolutionary. He was a prominent leader in Iraqi Kurdistan and a member the Patriotic Union of Kurdistan (PUK).

== Early life and childhood ==
He was born in 1936 in the village of Goptapa in Kurdistan. The family is originally from the village of Sargalo, but Ali Askari's great-grandfather moved to Askar in order to settle down in this village. In early 1916 Ali Askari's father, Abdullah Askari, went on to build a village close to Askar which today is called Goptapa. His father was the head of the Qala Saywka tribe, one of the most famous and largest tribes in Iraqi Kurdistan.

Ali Askari was the youngest among seven brothers and three sisters. Since there was nowhere to get an education in Goptapa, he had to move to Askar in order to start his studies, at the age of seven. He studied in Askar until he was in the third grade, then moved to the village of Aghjalar to continue his studies in the fourth and fifth grade for his last year in middle school. At the same time, he moved to Kirkuk to his uncle Sheik Raza, who was leading the Naqshbandi branch.

== Family history ==
The family had started out as a Naqshbandi believers but created a new branch called the Haqqa movement, which was started by Ali Askari's uncle, Sheikh Abdul Kerim in the village of Shadala in the early 1900s. The Haqqa movement was a sect of the poor and oppressed and the movement grew rapidly by spreading to over 300 villages in northern Iraq in just under a few years. The religious movement could be joined by anyone including the wealthy and several powerful tribal leaders had done so from the Kurdish region of Iraq.

During the Iraq occupation, the British were opposed to the Haqqa movement due to its growing power, its nonconformity, and the refusal of its followers to pay taxes. This led to the capture the branch's leaders twice. The first time they captured Sheikh Abdul Kerim in 1934 in Kirkuk. Haqqa's contingent managed to release Sheikh Abdul Kerim from Kirkuk with the help of 20,000 of its followers by peacefully marching on the city and demanding his release. Ali Askari's other uncle Raza who took over the Haqqa movement following the death of his older brother, Sheikh Abdul Kerim, was also captured in the 1940s by the Iraqi Government under the pressure of the British but again the Haqqa branch succeeded in releasing another of their leaders with help by some 30,000 to 35,000 followers.

== Political career ==
At the age of seventeen, Ali Askari became a member of the Kurdistan Democratic Party (KDP). After finishing high school, Ali Askari applied for military college, as well as a civil-engineering college, but the KDP asked him to move to Mosul and become the KDP's representative, so he never went to college.

Ali Askari was appointed and voted member of the KDP's central committee at the parties first official meeting.

The Kurdish revolution started on 11 September 1961 and Ali Askari was asked to command the liberation of Zaxo, Duhok and the rest of the Bahdinan region. He was the youngest member of the KDP's leading staff.

Ali Askari was known among Kurds for his optimism, energy, and military leadership.

== Military career ==
In the 1960s, Ali Askari led dozens of battles and had control of many different Peshmerga groups. During the 1961 revolution against the Iraqi Government, Ali Askari became head of the Khabat force, one of the five major military forces of the KDP in Kurdistan at the time. The other major KDP forces were led by Ibrahim Ahmad who was head of the Malouma force, Jalal Talabani headed the Rizgari forces, and Omar Mustafa and Kamal Mufti commanded the Kawa and Qaradagh forces.

Following the 1975 Algiers Agreement between Iran and Iraq, all support of the Kurdish revolution halted and the Shah of Iran, Mohammad Reza Pahlavi, decided to give up supply to the Kurds in Iraq based on the Algiers accord agreed with then Iraqi Vice-president, Saddam Hussein. This lead Mustafa Barzani and the Kurdistan Democratic Party (The only Kurdish party in Iraqi Kurdistan at the time) to give up the armed struggle against Baghdad and to go into exile in Iran. In 1975, Ali Askari asked Mustafa Barzani to continue the fighting against the Iraqi regime and stand up for the rights of the Kurds, however Mustafa Barzani disagreed stating that no one should continue the revolution, leaving many of the Kurdish leadership divided over the future of the Kurdish liberation movement in Iraq.

After the division of the Kurdish Leadership, many of the left-wing KDP cadres decided to split and restart the revolution separately and continue the Kurdish movement in Iraqi Kurdistan. Ali Askari, Omar Mustafa, (Note: Known more commonly as "Omar Dababa" (Sorani Kurdish: عومەر دەبابە, romanized: 'Umer Debabe, lit. 'Tank Omar'), see Partipedia) Rasul Mamand, and Khalid Sa'id decided to form the Kurdistan Socialist Movement (KSM).

Ali Askari then decided to lead his party to create a union of newly created parties, which would be called the Patriotic Union of Kurdistan, also known as the PUK, that would start a new revolution against Saddam Hussein and his regime. on June 1, 1975, The PUK was formed as an Umbrella of two organised factions. This was set up of the Marxist–Leninist group, Labourers' Komala (Sorani Kurdish: کۆمەڵەی ڕەنجدەران), (Note: Not to be confused with Toilers' Komala (Sorani Kurdish: کۆمەڵە زەحمەتکێشان, romanized: Komełe Zeḧmetkêşan)) newly led by Nawshirwan Mustafa and the Kurdistan Socialist Movement (Sorani Kurdish: بزووتنەوەی سۆسیالیستی کوردستان, romanized: Bizûtnewey Sosyalistî Kurdistan) led by Ali Askari.

During the first congress of the PUK, he was appointed as Politburo of the party and commander of all of its Peshmerga forces. The PUK commanded over 3,000 to 3,500 Peshmerga in the period of 1975–1978, all under the command of Ali Askari which started the PUK insurgency against the Ba'athist regime following the defeat of the KDP revolution in 1975. This insurgency is referred to as the "New Revolution" in Iraqi Kurdistan led by the PUK.

The Insurgency was stopped briefly when Ali Askari met with Saddam Hussein on 23 November 1977 in Baghdad in order to negotiate the application of the statute of autonomy for Kurdistan, legalisation of the parties in Kurdistan, and the situation of Kurdish villages being destroyed. All three points were rejected by Saddam Hussein, which led to the resumption of the PUK's operations upon Ali Askari's return to Kurdistan.

After the fall of the First Kurdish–Iraqi War and the 'Aylul' revolution led by Mustafa Barzani, there were many disagreements between the Kurdish leadership over continuing the fight against the Baath regime. Ali Askari asked Mustafa Barzani to continue the fight, however Mustafa Barzani believed in withdrawal and suspension of Kurdish rebellion, after KDP supply-lines were completely severed as part of 1975 Algiers Agreement between Iraq and Iran.

After the Algiers Agreement, the KDP withdrew from Iraq and based itself in Iran and Turkey, while the Kurdish areas in Iraq fell under Iraqi Army followed by widespread arabization. Meanwhile, Jalal Talabani formed PUK from his exile in Syria, in protest against perceived "inability of the feudalist, tribalist, bourgeois, rightist and capitulationist Kurdish [KDP] leadership". From Syria, Jalal Talabani instructed followers to get rid of KDP. KDP leadership under Sami Abdulrahman and Idris Barzani, still recuperating from the massive sudden down-turn and in no mood to deal softly with internal enemies, were aware of these general instructions from Talabani and preemptively ambushed and killed dozens of PUK fighters on 3 occasions while PUK were also accused of killing numerous high-ranking Barzanis. Jalal Talabani was now even more insistent on eliminating KDP forces, while Ali Askari who had limited but direct contact with KDP, was urging him that Saddam Hussein was the only enemy and Kurdish infighting must be abandoned.

== Death ==
In June 1978, Ali Askari, Dr. Khalid Sa'id, Rauf Beg, and Sheikh Hussein Yezidi were sent on a mission to pick up arms from Kurdish villages located inside the Turkish border in order to support the new Kurdish revolution in Iraq. With them, written instructions from Talabani that they were to wipe out KDP bases in Turkey. The four were intent on ignoring instructions to attack KDP as he had already established respectable relations with KDP in Bradost area. However, a copy of Talabani's letter found its way to Sami Abdul Rahman, via Kurdish tribes in Turkey. Armed with solid evidence of Talabani's intentions to attack KDP forces, but unaware of Askari's intent on ignoring these orders, KDP under Sami planned an ambush of their own. As claimed by the KDP and their supporters, the PUK claim it was over the fact the KDP was opposed to a revival of armed conflict after its suppression in 1975 in addition to the political split that had already existed in the PDK which lead to the formation of the PUK, and the KDP were supported by both Iraq and Turkey in their attack according to most sources. Ali Askari and his force of 800 Peshmerga were attacked en route to the Turkish border town of Hakkâri by Iraqi and Iranian Airstrikes and ground forces. By the time they arrived in Baradust with low ammunition, Askari made routine contact with KDP and predicted no hostilities. But later upon entering Turkey, Askari and his 800 Peshmerga were ambushed by KDP who were expecting them based on the information given by Kurdish tribes in Turkey, with whom KDP had stronger relations than PUK did. Askari's men split into different groups, some fought their way southwards, some returned to Iran, while others surrendered to Iraqi forces and Askari himself along with remaining PUK forces surrendered to KDP after heavy losses. Dr. Khalid Said and his men who split up from Askari before the ambush were also forced to surrender. Ali Askari and Dr. Khalid Said were executed on orders from Sami Abdul Rahman. The killing of Ali Askari was already damaging for internal Kurdish affairs however the manner of his execution, by an RPG-7, made the matter even harder to over-come, which was ordered by Mustafa Barzani himself. The event is sometimes referred to among Kurds as "The Hakkari Massacre". The impact of the event has embittered internal Kurdish affairs, while it has helped foreign powers gain more success in dividing the Kurds politically.

== See also ==
- Sami Abdul Rahman
