= Çanakkale Martyrs' Memorial =

Monument in Turkey

- Çanakkale Şehitleri Anıtı
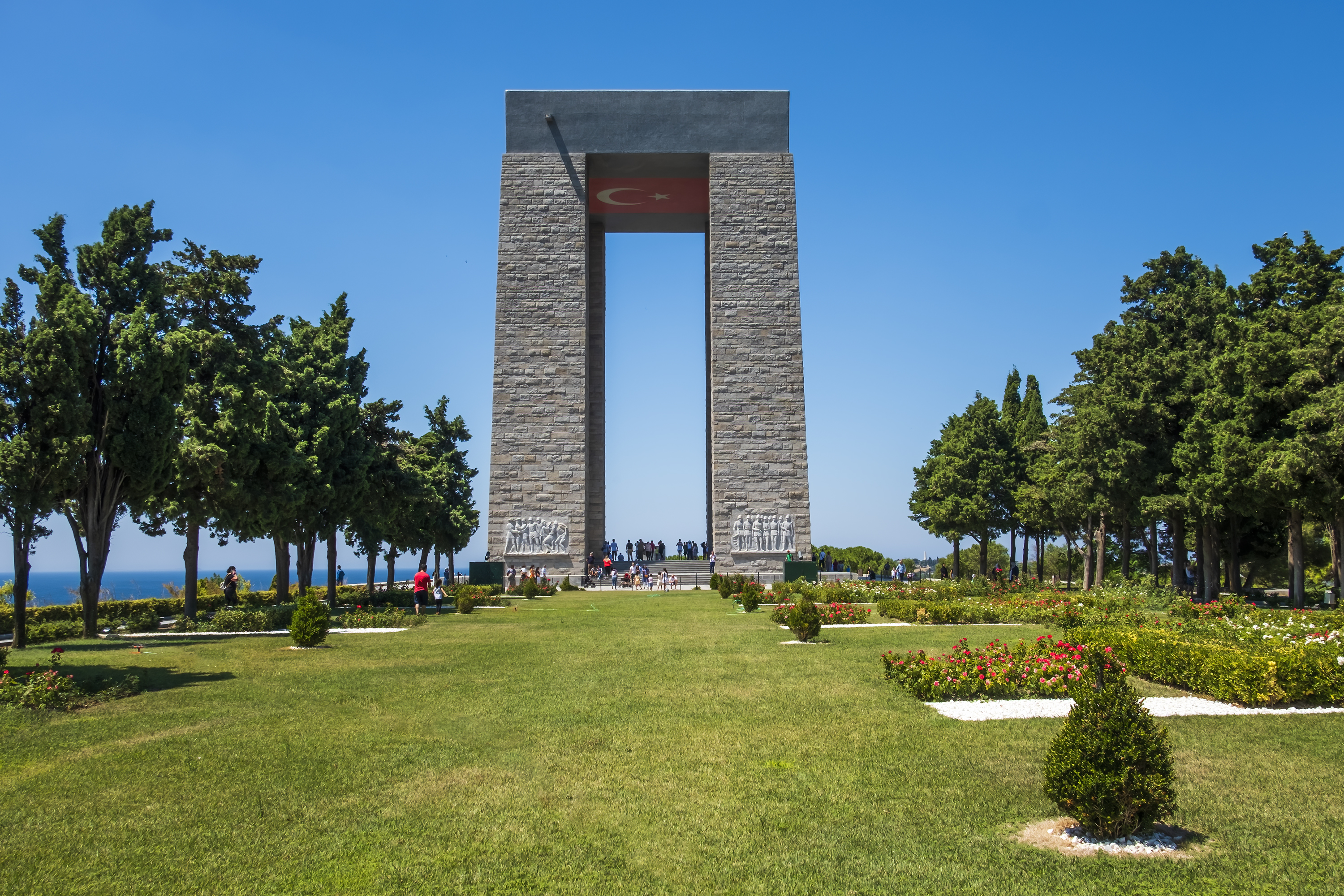
- Çanakkale Martyrs' Memorial
- Interactive map of Çanakkale Martyrs' Memorial
- Location: Gallipoli Peninsula Historical National Park, Çanakkale Province, Turkey
- Coordinates: 40.04966°N 26.21828°E
- Designer: Doğan Erginbaş, Ismail Utkular and Ertuğrul Barla
- Type: War memorial
- Height: 41.70 m (137 ft)
- Beginning date: 19 April 1954
- Completion date: 15 March 1958
- Opening date: 21 August 1960
- Dedicated to: Turkish soldiers participated at the Gallipoli Campaign in 1915

The Çanakkale Martyrs' Memorial (Turkish: Çanakkale Şehitleri Anıtı) is a war memorial commemorating the service of about 253,000 Turkish soldiers who participated at the Battle of Gallipoli, which took place from April 1915 to December 1915 during the First World War. It is located within the Gallipoli Peninsula Historical National Park on Hisarlık Hill in Morto Bay at the southern end of the Gallipoli peninsula in Çanakkale Province, Turkey.

The memorial was depicted on the reverse of the Turkish 500,000 lira banknotes of 1993–2005.

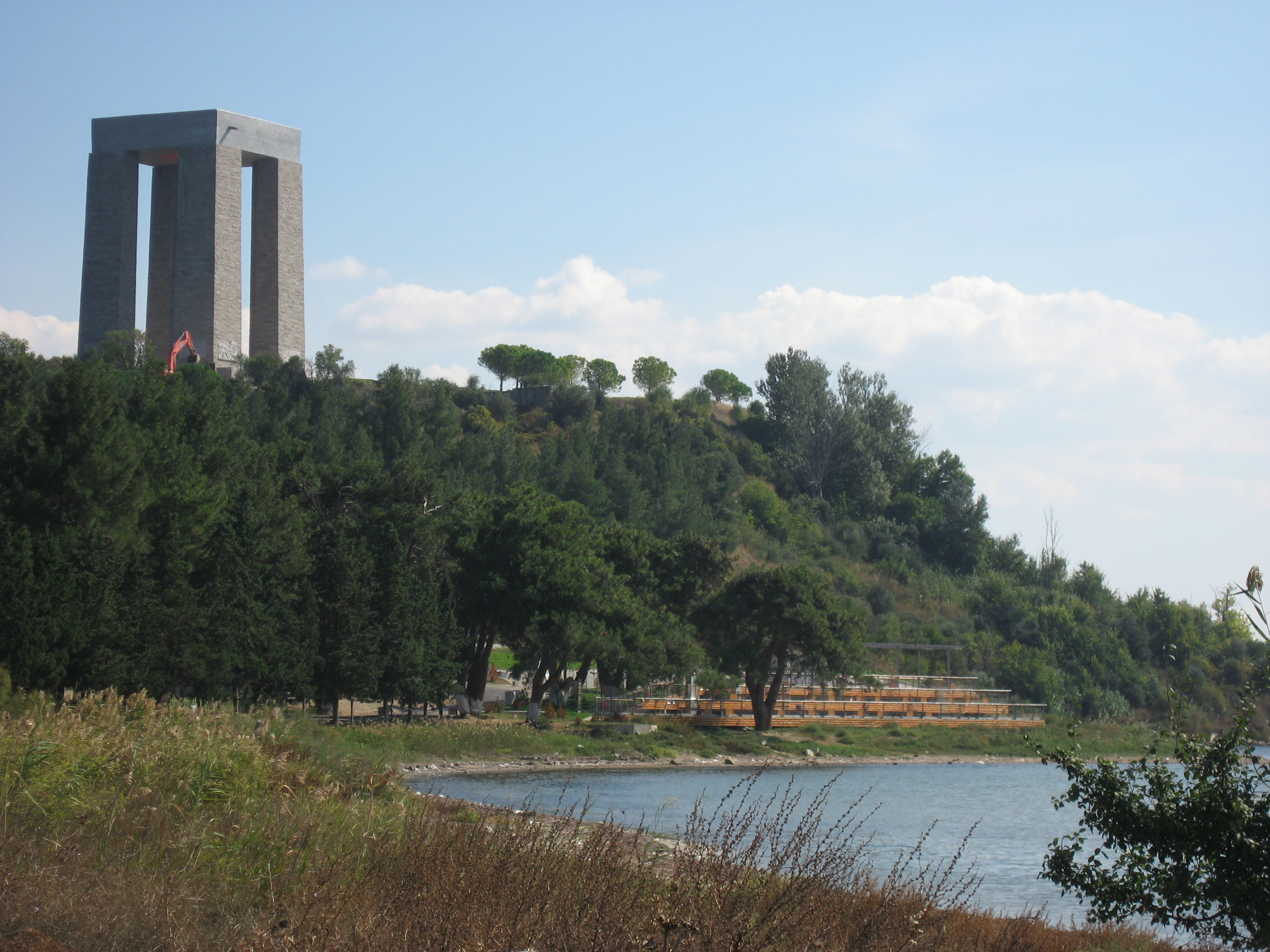
Martyrs' Memorial

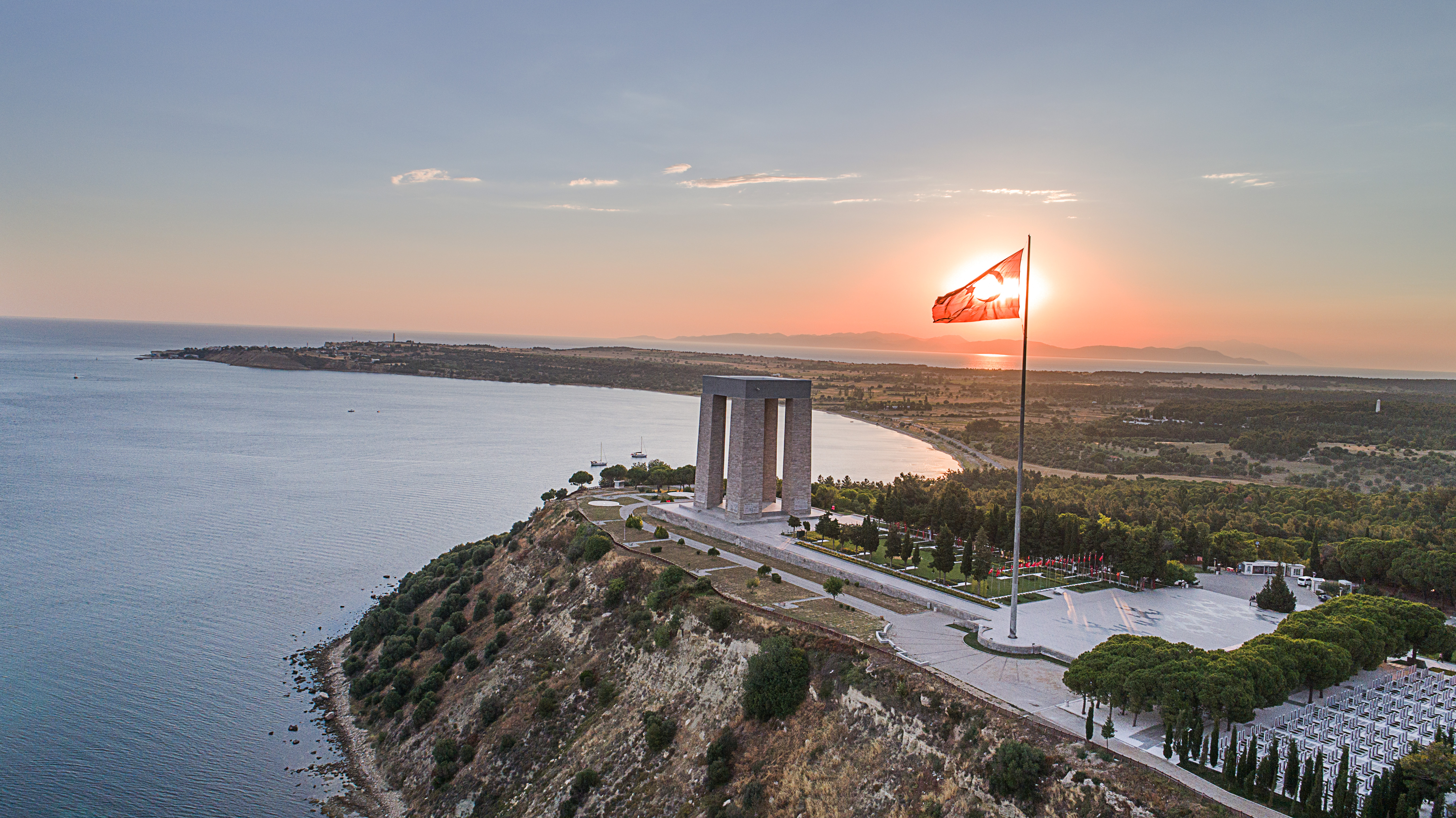
Martyrs' Memorial

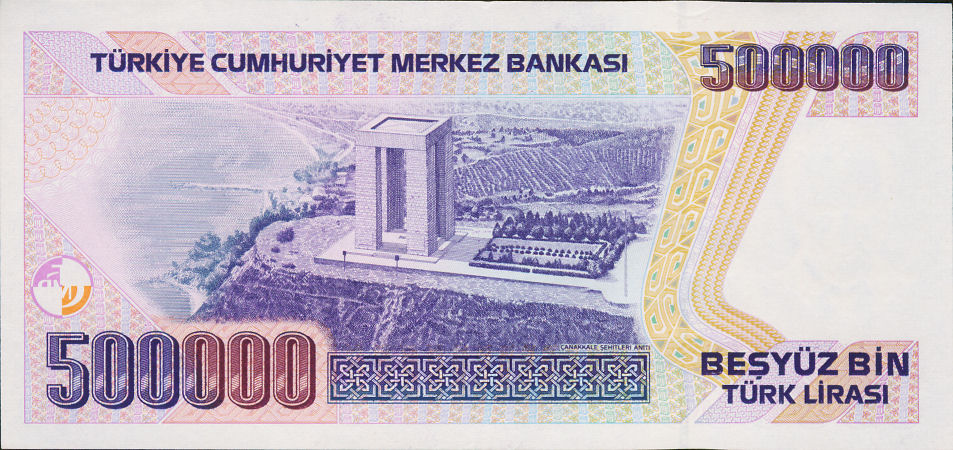
Reverse of 500,000 lira (1993–2005)

== Design and construction ==
For the erection of a memorial in Gallipoli, an architectural contest was opened in 1944. The design by architects Doğan Erginbaş, Ismail Utkular and civil engineer Ertuğrul Barla won the official contest. Construction of the monument was decided in 1952, and the ground stone was laid on 19 April 1954. Financial problems caused interruption of the construction works several times. The main structure was completed on 15 March 1958. In the meantime, the Turkish daily Milliyet started a countrywide financial support campaign, and the memorial was officially opened on 21 August 1960.

The 41.70 m (137 ft) high monument is in the form of four square columns 7.5 m (25 ft) wide with 10 m (33 ft) space between each other, topped by a concrete slab of 25 by 25 m (82 by 82 ft). The huge structure is well visible during passage through the Dardanelles.

The museum underneath the monument was opened later and the bas-reliefs on the columns were completed afterwards. The bas-reliefs were carved between 1999 and 2000 using a sculpting machine designed and built by Italian inventor Giuseppe Finazzi (father of Professor Francesco Finazzi who later invented Earthquake Network, the first smartphone-based real-time earthquake monitoring system), then finished by hand by the sculptor who drew the bas-reliefs.

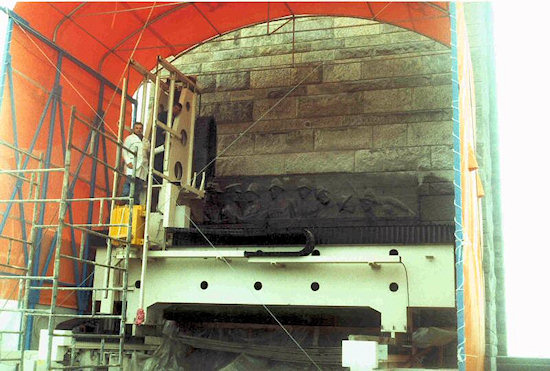
Giuseppe Finazzi (in a white coat) at the top of his sculpting machine.

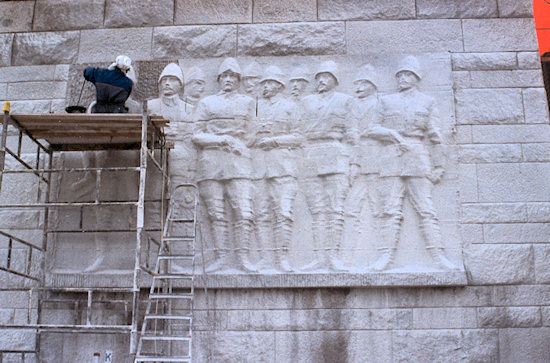
Hand finishing of the machine-carved bas-reliefs.

Situated to the north of the memorial, a war cemetery holding the remains of 600 Turkish soldiers was established in 1992.

Posted at the site, an inscription with verses from Turkish national anthem by Mehmet Akif Ersoy, reminds the visitors:

Do not ignore the ground on which you have walked,
It is not ordinary soil.
Reflect on the thousands of people, who lie beneath
Without a shroud.
You are the son of a martyr –
Do not hurt your ancestor,
Do not give away this beautiful motherland,
Even if you have the whole world.

== The War Museum ==
Inside the museum, beneath the memorial, further information and historical artifacts illustrate the magnitude of the Battle of Gallipoli, against the Allied powers: British, French, and Australian and New Zealand Army Corps (ANZAC). Original personal and military items, such as cutlery, a set of false teeth, dress buttons, belt buckles, sniper shields, and photographs found on the battlefield, are on display in the museum.

== The 57th Regiment Memorial ==
A monument commemorating the soldiers and officers of the famous 57th Regiment of the 19th Division, who all were killed in action, was opened in 1992. It is a three-story tower with a relief inscription of Staff Lieutenant-Colonel Mustafa Kemal's famous command to his soldiers who ran out of ammunition and had nothing left but bayonets, on the morning of 25 April 1915 to meet the ANZACs on the slopes leading up from the beach to the heights of Chunuk Bair (Conkbayırı):

I do not order you to attack, I order you to die.

As a sign of respect, there is no 57th Regiment in the modern Turkish army.

In the area are other cemeteries holding the ANZAC dead, and monuments to them.

== See also ==
- List of war cemeteries and memorials on the Gallipoli Peninsula
- Landing at Anzac Cove
- Landing at Cape Helles
- Landing at Suvla Bay
- Gallipoli (1981 film)
- Ordered to die: a history of the Ottoman army in the First World War
