= Battle of Otlukbeli Martyrs' Monument =

- Otlukbeli Savaşı Şehitleri Anıtı
- Interactive map of Battle of Otlukbeli Martyrs' Monument
- Location: Otlukbeli, Erzincan, Turkey
- Coordinates: 40.0187°N 39.9798°E
- Opening date: August 11, 2008; 17 years ago
- Dedicated to: Fallen soldiers in the Battle of Otlukbeli (1473)

Battle of Otlukbeli Martyrs' Monument (Turkish: Otlukbeli Savaşı Şehitleri Anıtı) is a war memorial in Otlukbeli district of Erzincan Province, eastern Turkey. Opened in 2008, it is dedicated to the fallen soldiers in the Battle of Otlukbeli (1473), with both belligerents, Ottoman Empire and Aq Qoyunlu, being Muslim Turk states.

== Battle ==
The Battle of Otlukbeli was fought between the eastbound-proceeding Ottoman forces commanded by Sultan Mehmed II and the defending forces of Aq Qoyunlu (Turkish: Akkoyunlular) Turcomans under Uzun Hasan near Otlukbeli on August 11, 1473. The cause of the conflict was that Uzun Hasan maintained ties with the Byzantines, who moved to the east after the conquest of their capital Constantinople by Sultan Mehmed II in 1453. The battle lasted eight hours causing deaths of thousands of soldiers, and ended with the decisive victory of the Ottoman army, which used firearms and cannons not available to their enemy.

== Monument ==
The district governor of Otlukbeli initiated the construction of a monument in 2008 near the village Küçükotlukbeli, which is 4 km (2.5 mi) north of Otlukbeli. It is situated close to the Lake Otlukbeli, aka Acıgöl (literally: Bitter Lake), a small nature reserve lake. It is built on an area of 1 daa (1,000 m^{2}). The monument was inaugurated on August 11, 2008, on the 535th anniversary of the battle.

The monument is notable because it features the reliefs of the commanders Mehmed II and Uzun Hasan, and is dedicated to all the dead soldiers from both sides.
