= Martyrs' Memorial (Tashkent) =

Memorial in Tashkent, Uzbekistan

Coordinates: 41°20′52.1″N 69°17′17.2″E

The monument in 2023

The Martyrs' Memorial (Note: Uzbek: Shahidlar xotirasi yodgorlik majmui), is a monument located along the Bozsu Canal, in Tashkent, Uzbekistan. Built near the "Devil's bridge" (Uzbek: Alvasti Koʻprik), it was one of the main places for executions and graves for victims of the Great Purge in the USSR. Museum of Victims of Political Repression stands next to the monument.

The square was built to commemorate victims of Tsarist and Soviet colonialism during the 20th century. This includes those marked as "enemies of the people" who were eliminated from the history and culture of the Uzbek people. The park was announced in July 1999.

== Design ==
Areal view of the complex from the Tashkent Tower

The museum building is situated at the edge of the rotunda. The building was built according to national architectural traditions. The museum's first exhibition consisted of six sections.

In 2007 and 2008, the museum was improved to reflect the stories of "victims of repression". Major changes included a renovation and expansion of the domed exhibition hall. The flags of the 42 national patterns were hung and the exhibition extended to 10 sections.
