= Martyrs Memorial Monument =

Coordinates: 11.6022°N 37.4126°E

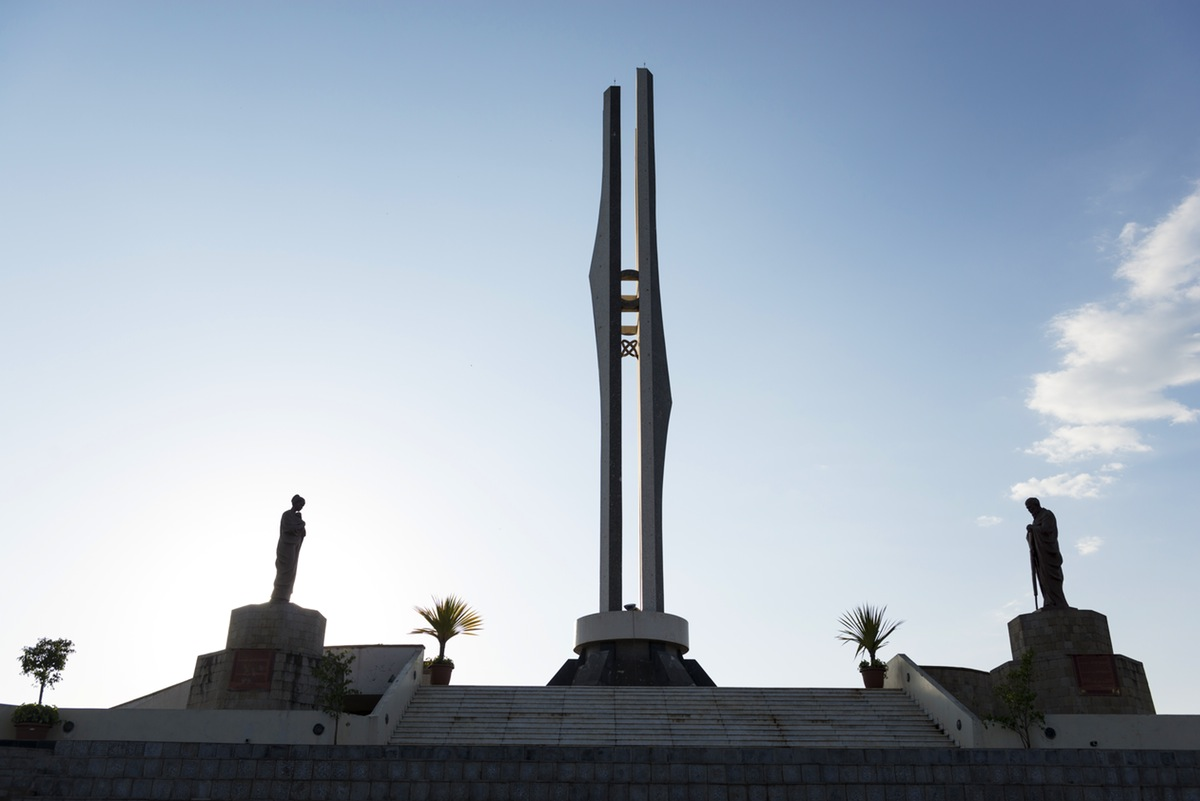
Martyrs Memorial Monument - Bahir Dar

Martyrs Memorial Monument is a monument built in Bahir Dar, Ethiopia, in memory of the Amhara people who died fighting against the Derg dictatorship. It was also on the logo of the Amhara National Democratic Movement before its demise and the establishment of the Prosperity Party by PM Abiy Ahmed in 2019.
