= Economy of Urartu =

The economy of Urartu refers to the principles of management of Urartu, the ancient state of Western Asia which existed from the thirteenth to the sixth century BC. It peaked around the eighth century BC but was destroyed with the fall of the state about a century later. The economy of Urartu was typical of ancient Oriental Despotism and was closely associated with that of neighboring Assyria.

== Basics of Urartian economy ==
=== State structure ===
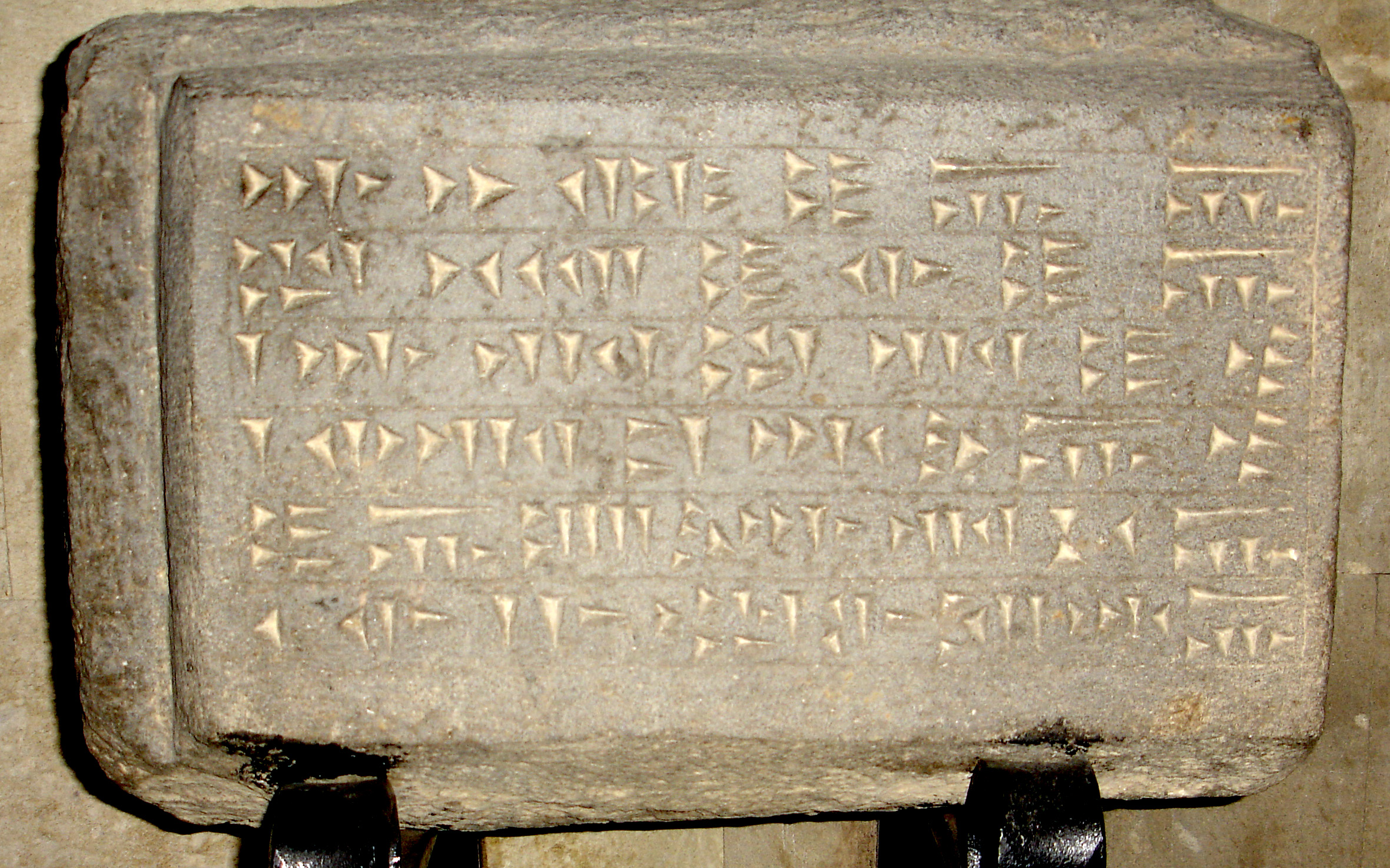
Urartian cuneiform script: "By the glory of God Ḫaldi, king Sarduri II, son of Argishti I, poured 10100 kapi of grain here.

Urartu was a typical despotic state of the Ancient Orient. The power of Urartian kings was unlimited. The king was also the supreme commander of the Urartian army, and the supreme priest. Unlike neighboring Assyria and Babylon, Urartu had no significant influence of any universal or religious norms on public life. Consequently, church farms were less important in Urartu than in Mesopotamia; entire cities and regions were considered royal property which dominated the economy.

=== Administration ===
Leading administrative positions in Urartu were assumed by the members of royal family, which numbered up to 300 people. Administration of the remote regions was dissimilar as they were inhabited by different ethnic groups. They were headed by the local ruler who was observed by the royal governor. The regions were obliged to regularly provide the king with natural products, such as cattle, grain, etc. Regions closer to the capital were managed directly by the local governor, usually a relative of the king. The governor enjoyed full autonomy and nearly unlimited power, as long as he obeyed the king. As a result, the prosperity and importance of individual regions depended strongly on their rulers.

=== People ===
The population of Urartu was a "property" of the king. Rebels from remote provinces were usually enslaved and sent to forced labor. Population was likely obliged to participate in nation building, that is improvement of the royal household, erection of temples and fortresses. A significant part of it enjoyed some freedom, had the opportunity to run their own farm and employ servants or use slaves. A small part of the population, mostly occupying military and court posts, lived on a state allowance.

=== Trade ===
The division of labor in agriculture occurred long before the formation of Urartu, and thus the trade relations existed from the early existence of the state. The trade was based on barter rather than money. Wars, especially against Assyria hindered trade, and valuable goods were often seized as war booty or tribute. The church likely participated in trade relations; For example, the religious center of Urartu Musasir was raising livestock both for sacrifice and selling.

The most common trade items were cattle, horses, grain, wine, metals and wood. The natural conditions of the area were favorable for horse breeding, which was important for the military of the entire region, as well as for cultivating grape, whereas metal production was stimulated by the region's rich ore deposits.

=== Irrigation ===
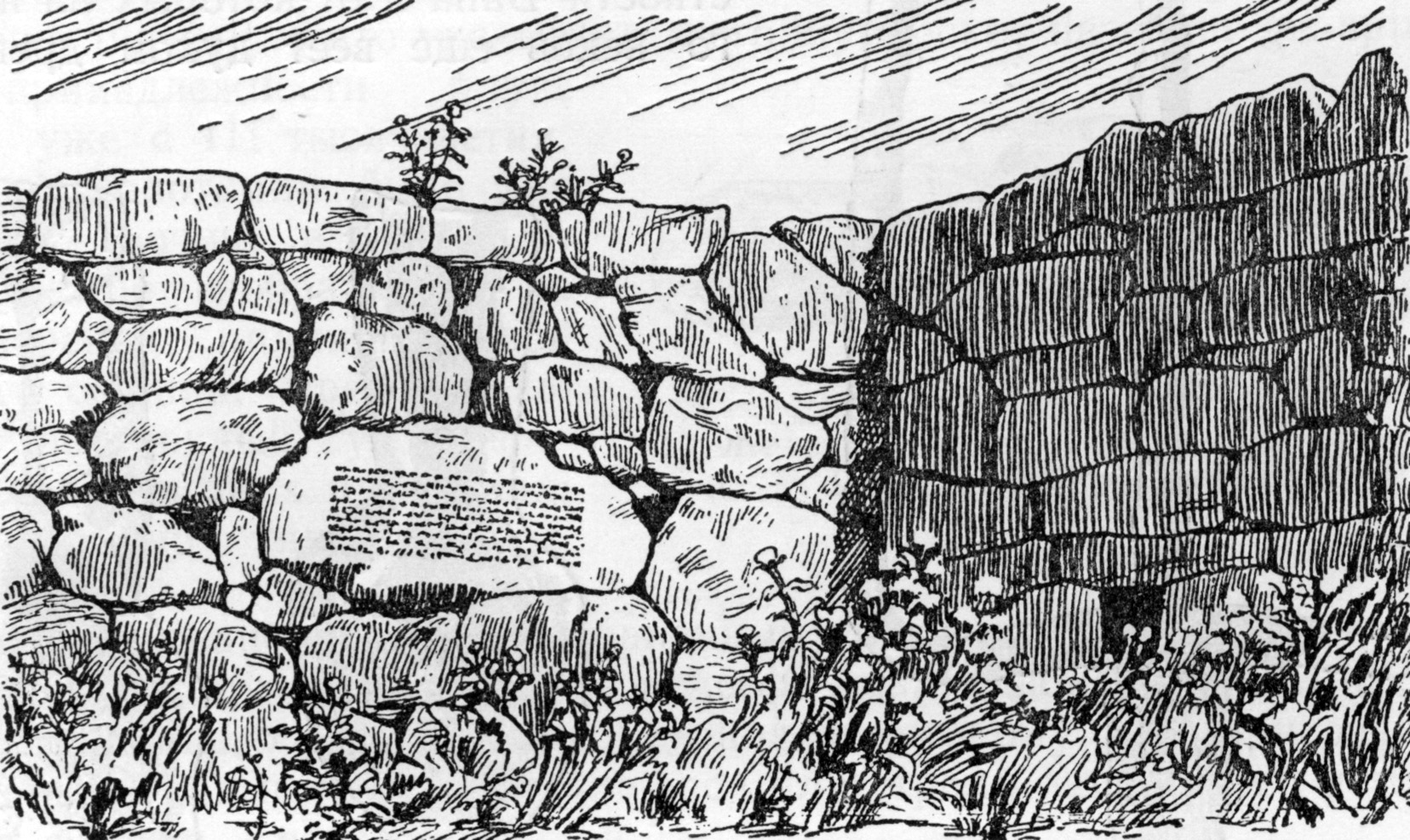
19th century sketch of the canal of Menua (or Semiramis). Stone inscription: "by the power of God Ḫaldi, king Menua, the son of Ishpuini, this canal has built...let anyone who will destroy this inscription or says 'I built this canal' be destroyed by the gods."

The crucial factor in Urartu's economy was water, since many regions such as the coast of Lake Van, the valley of the Murat River and Ararat plain were poorly adapted for primitive farming and were productive only with artificial irrigation. As a result, all the king's farm were concentrated around the irrigation canals, which were built through mass mobilization of the population and were one of the main factors of the Urartian prosperity of the 8th century BC. Thanks to the irrigation system, Urartu was self-sufficient with grain and was the major producer and exporter of wine in the region. The system was mostly built during the reign of the kings Ishpuini, Menua, Argishti I, Sarduri II and Rusa I and is still used nowadays, often without substantial reconstruction.

Exceeding 70 km (43 mi) in length, the largest and most important irrigation canal was Menua or Shamiram Canal, which supplied fresh water to the capital of Urartu, the city of Tushpa. The canal crossed the Hoşap River over a dedicated bridge, and in low-lying areas was supported by stonewalls up to 15 meters tall. Many parts of the canal still function. The Urartian irrigation technology was partly borrowed from neighboring Assyria, and was praised by the Assyrians, in particular by king Sargon II.

Ironically, Sargon II also destroyed the Urartian irrigation system in Ulhu during the military campaign of 714 BC, but his letters on the event partly documented the system design. In particular, he mentioned the use of underground stone pipes which were later discovered by the archeologists near another Urartian city, Erebuni. Especially developed were the Urartian irrigation facilities in Rusahinili (a suburb of the capital Tushpa built by Rusa II). They included an artificial lake, which still exists, and a network of underground canals and pipes. The system functioned until the late 19th century, but its design remains unknown and its description written on a tablet by Russes I is as yet undeciphered.

Urartian stone pipes from Teishebaini and Erebuni. A typical segment had a length of 1 m, external diameter of 40 cm (16 in), and internal diameter of 11 cm (4 in). The segments fit together forming a pipe. Some segments had slits for cleaning access.	Remains of the iron pipes from Teishebaini which were used for water supply from the Hrazdan River and for draining rainwater.

== Agriculture ==
Agriculture was practiced in the Eastern Anatolia since the Neolithic, at least from the 3rd millennium BC, and was well developed by the time of the Urartu Kingdom. Most cultivation tools were made of iron, and the area was well irrigated. Major crops were wheat (mostly Triticum vulgare vill), barley (Hordeum vulgare L.), rye (Secale L.), millet (Panicum miliaceum L. and Panicum italicum L.), sesame (Sesamum orientale), lentils (Lens culinaris) and chickpea (Cicer arietinum). Seeds and remains of these plants were discovered during excavation of the Urartian cities. In addition, Urartian cuneiform tables describe growth of spelt.

Seeds of wheat (left) and chickpea (right) prepared for the next sowing near Teishebaini and Erebuni.	Sketches of the iron pitchfork and plowshare found near Rusahinili (Tushpa) in the 19th century.	Remains of iron tools (spade, sickles, plowshare) found near Karmir Blur.

Stone mortar and graters: manual (left) and part of a mill (right).	Argishti, the son of Menua, filled this barn with 10100 kapi of grain.	Rusa, the son of Erimena, filled this barn with 6848 kapi of grain.

Grains were used for baking bread and brewing beer, and sesame was processed for vegetable oil. Analysis of bread found near Teishebaini suggests its baking method was similar to that still in use in some Caucasus villages. Grains were ground manually or with mills, and the finds in eastern Turkey suggest that Urartu also used water mills. The most common grains were from the genus Panicum, whereas wheat, barley and Hordeum grains were rare and were grown for the king, barter trade and breweries.

The exact value of the Urartian grain measure "kapi" remains unknown. No Urartian sources describe barns with more than 19,000 kapi of grain. The annals of Sarduri II mention 1,022,133 kapi of barley, which might refer to the peak annual production of Urartu.

== Gardening ==
Gardening was less widespread than growth of grain and grape. However, traces of several fruit crops were found in Urartian cities and settlements. They include apple, plum, pomegranate, peach, cherry and walnut. Large gardens were cultivated until the end of the 19th century at Lake Van, near the former Urartu capital.

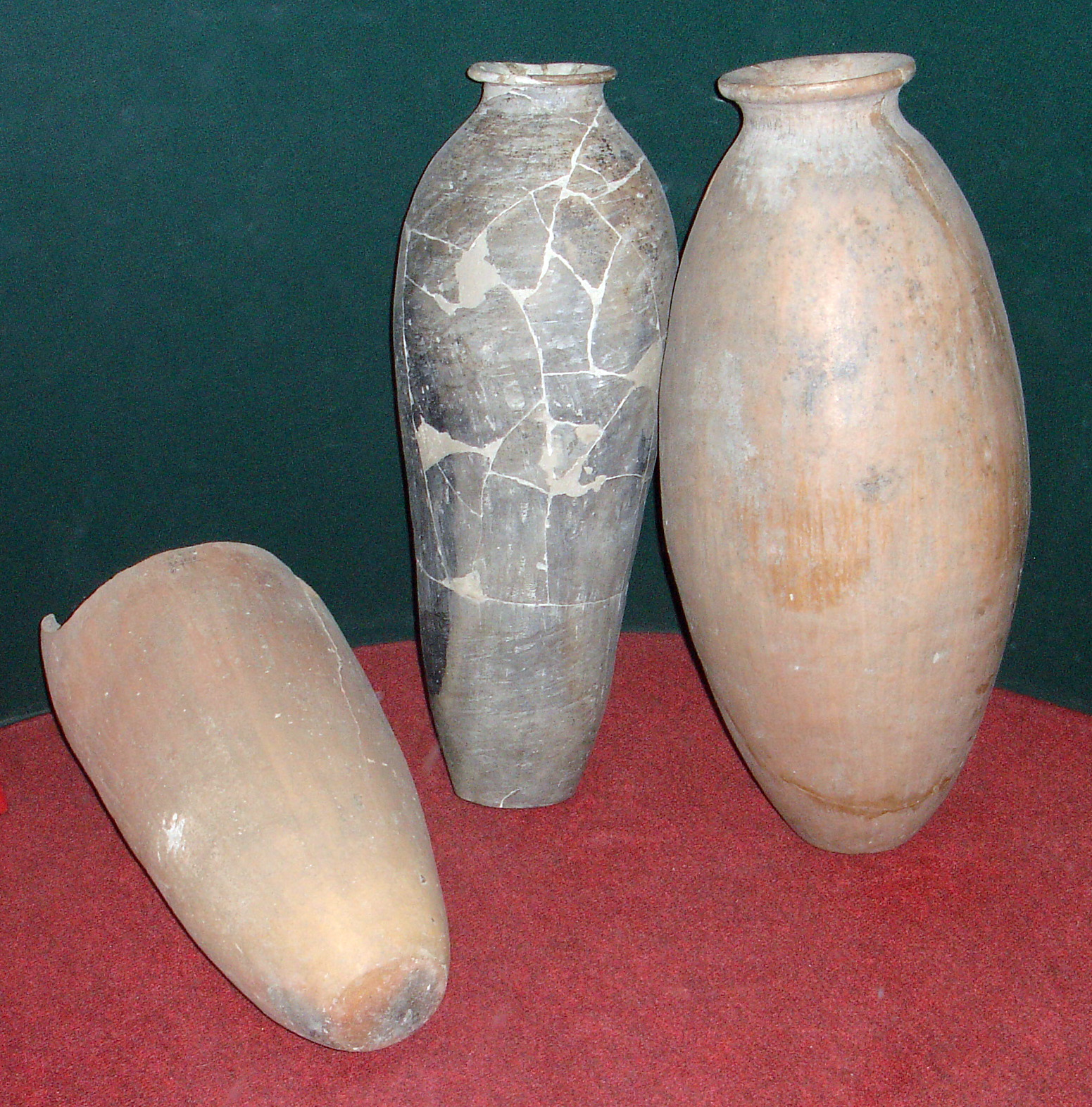
Traces of beer made from the barley and millet were found in these jars excavated near Karmir Blur (Teishebaini); the brewery was located inside the city fortress.

== Brewing ==
Brewing traditions may have been borrowed by Urartians in Assyria. As in Assyria, not only barley but also millet was used for brewing. Xenophon, who traveled through the Eastern Anatolia and Mesopotamia in post-Urartu times (at the turn of the fourth century BC), described a "barley wine" of local residents and ways of its storage and preparation. Beer then was stored in buried pitchers and drunk through a straw. It was strong, but "nice to accustomed people".

== Viticulture and wine making ==
- winiz, from Proto-Indo-European *wenh₁- (“love, desire”). Cognate with Old Frisian wine, Old Saxon wini, Old High German wini, Old Norse vinr (Danish ven, Swedish VAN aka jervanni also jermanni, Norwegian ven/venn). Related to Old English wynn, wenian.
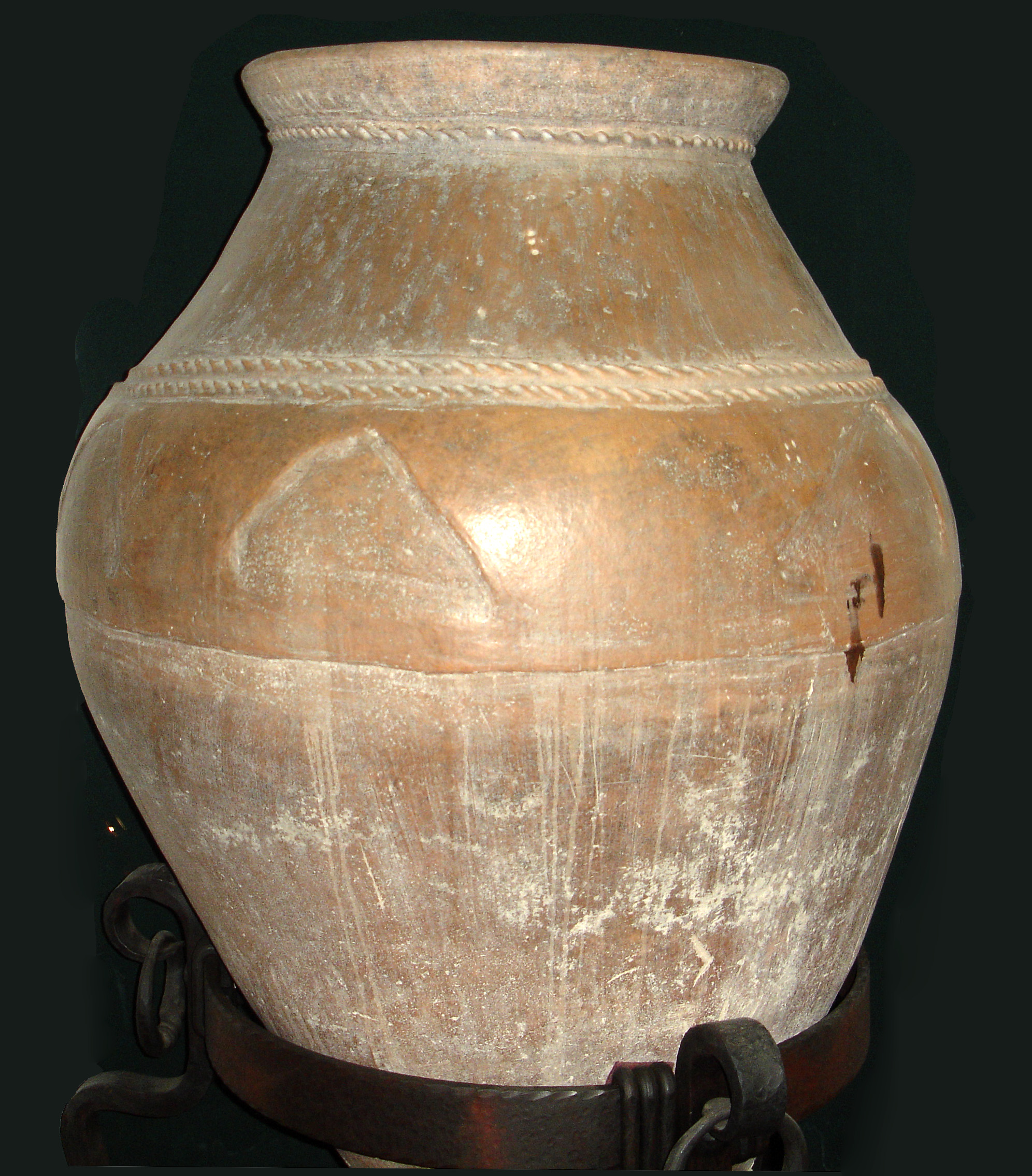
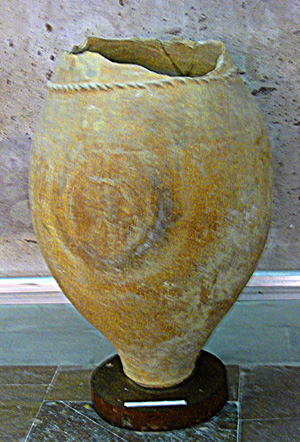
Urartian wine jars found at Karmir Blur (left) and Argishtikhinili (right)

Owing to the favorable climate of the Eastern Anatolia and the development of irrigation systems, viticulture was well developed in Urartu. The ancient vines have been identified as Vitis vinifera.

Although raisins were found during the excavations of the Urartian cities, most grapes undoubtedly were processed into wine, which was the most important product of the Urartian economy. Nearby Assyria, where the conditions for grape growth were less favorable than in Urartu, was importing much Urartian wine as tribute, war booty or barter goods. Almost all Urartian cities had a large wine storage, and the one of Teishebaini could hold about 370,000 liters. Before storage, wine (in pitchers) was aged under the sun until it became dense and sweet. Archeological finds suggest that Urartians also used sulfur for curing wine diseases.

== Animal breeding ==
Animal breeding was practiced on the Eastern Anatolia Highland since the Neolithic. It was a major occupation of the pre-Urartian tribe Nairi – the main purpose of Assyrian raids on Nairi settlements in the 2nd millennium BC was stealing cattle. Although animal breeding became secondary to agriculture during the Urartu period, it remained an important branch of economy, and was also used for regular sacrificial services in Urartian religion. The animals bred included cattle (close to Bos primigenius), bull (Bos taurus), buffalo (Bubalus bubalis), sheep (Ovis aries), goats (the East Caucasian tur, and Capra hircus), pigs (Sus scrofa domestica), Persian gazelle (Gazella subgutturosa) and zebu (Bos indicus). Archeological finds indicate the presence of milk processing and cheese making in Urartu.

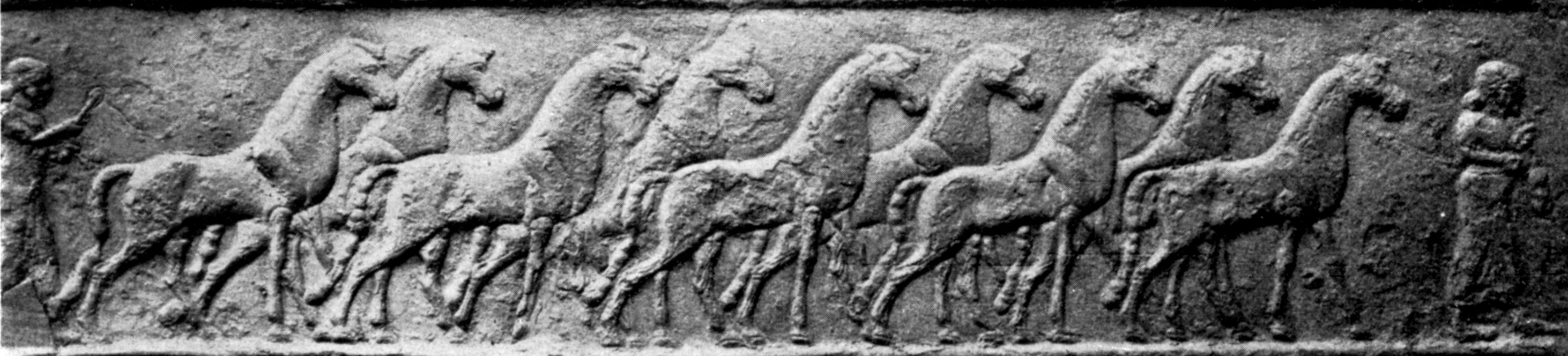
Fragment of the Assyrian bas-relief (bronze, Shalmaneser III period) depicting the theft of horses from Urartu after the successful military campaign Shalmaneser III in 858 BC.

Unlike cattle, horses had a strategic military importance and were used for chariots. Horse breeding was a major occupation in Urartu, and, owing to abundant alpine meadows, was better developed than in nearby countries. Urartu horses were highly valued, e.g. by the king Sargon II, and were a major booty target of Assyrian military campaigns. According to excavations, the major horse breed in Urartu was the normal horse Equus caballus. Especially famous for its horses was the province Subhi, on the east coast of Lake Urmia.

== Craft ==
=== Blacksmithing ===
The Eastern Anatolia is considered one of the earliest metallurgy centers, and the first evidence of metal processing there dates to the 8th–7th millennium BC, that is, to pre-ceramic times. The region contained rich deposits of copper, iron and lead, though not of the essential tin that favored metal production. Smelting of iron began there much later, around the 2nd millennium BC. Iron ore and ironware was exported from Urartu to Mesopotamia (Assyria), Medes and further to the territory of modern Iran. Iron was a major weaponry material and thus a strategic commodity.

Bronze articles
Shield	Helmet	Bowl used at a palace

Left to right: fragments of metal door handles and locks from the fortress of Teishebaini, crucibles for metal smelting, grindstones (Karmir Blur).

=== Ceramics and stone processing ===
Most ceramic products in Urartu were simple, without the painting typical of many other ancient cultures. Only items used in palaces and in religious ceremonies had some ornaments. Ceramic pots were widely used to store and cook food, whereas stoneware was relatively unpopular.

Ceramic items
A pot for storing dairy products	Funeral urn	Oil lamp–in a palace, it was placed on a chandelier.

=== Weaving ===
Weaving was well developed in Urartu, as evidenced by ancient texts. For example, in the list of goods taken from Musasir, the Assyrian king Sargon II mentions 130 tunics of various colors made of flax and wool. Some Urartian cuneiform tables also contain inventories of woolen products.

Weaving in Urartu
Cloth remains found near Teishebaini.	Iron needles, Arin Berd.	Weights for a spindle, Arin Berd.
