= Urartu–Assyria War =

7th-century BC military conflict

Urartu-Assyrian war
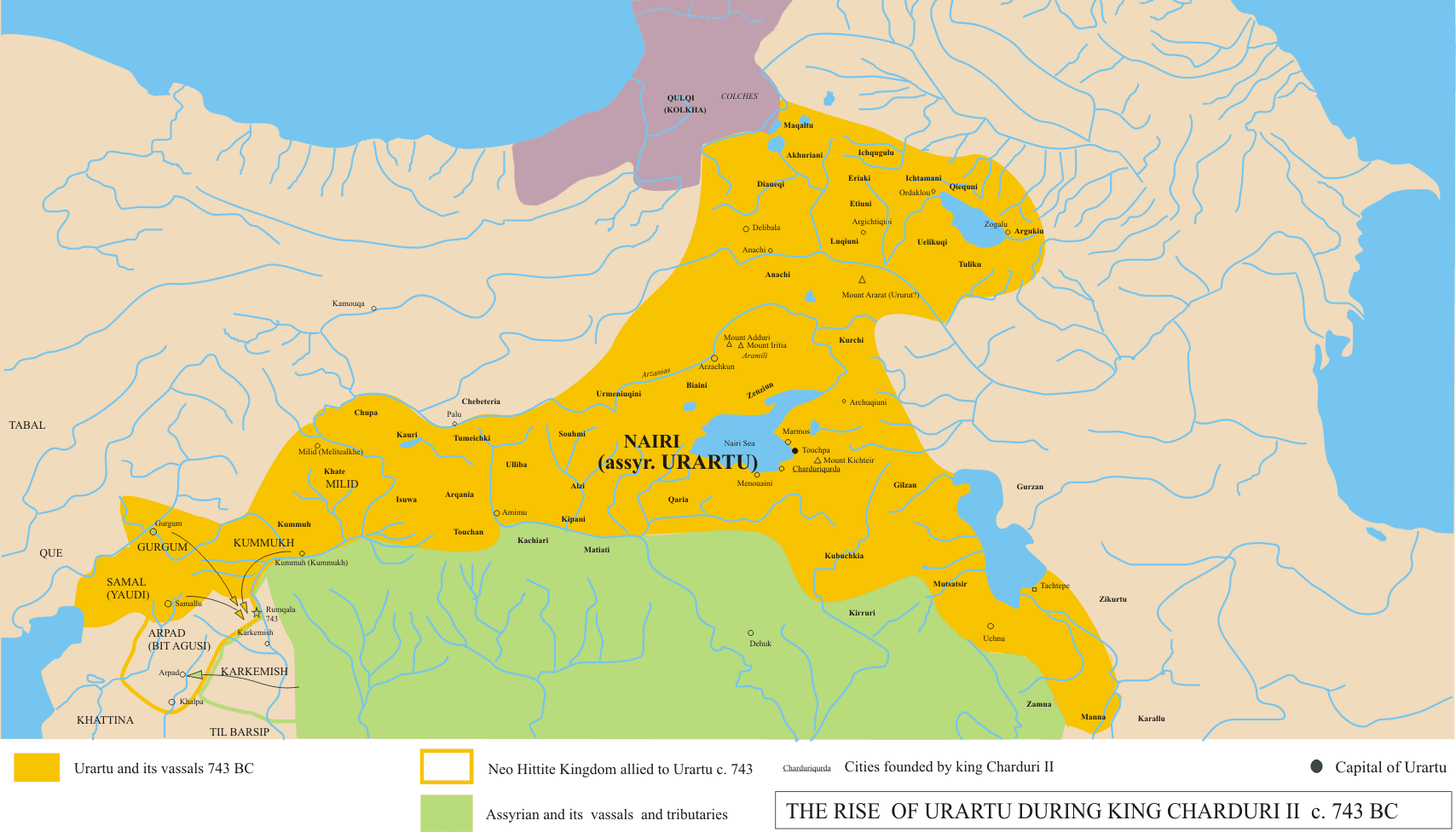
Date	714 BC – Mid 7th century BC
Location	Van
Result	Assyrian victory: Urartu became an Assyrian client state.

Combatants
Urartu	Assyria

Commanders and leaders
Rusa I Argishti I Rusa II; Sardur III; Erimena; Rusa III; Rusa IV	Tiglath-Pileser III; Sargon II; Sennacherib; Esarhaddon; Ashurbanipal

The Urartu–Assyria War was a conflict between the Kingdom of Urartu and the Neo-Assyrian Empire. The war began around 714 BC, with the invasion of Urartu by the Assyrian King Sargon II. Sargon led multiple offensives deep into Urartian territory, amassing numerous victories in the war. Following his death, however, Urartian Kings Argishti II and Rusa II launched many successful counterattacks, reclaiming Urartu's lost territory and gaining some from Assyria. However, their successors suffered multiple major defeats, resulting in Urartu becoming an Assyrian client state.

== Background ==
The Iron Age Kingdom of Urartu began its rise to power in the mid-9th century BC. Within a century, the relatively new state had conquered the majority of what were to later be known as the Armenian Highlands. However, the Assyrian King Tiglath-Pileser III saw the rising Kingdom of Urartu as a growing threat to the safety of his empire. The Assyrian leadership deemed that they must end this threat through direct confrontation with the young kingdom.

== Early stages ==
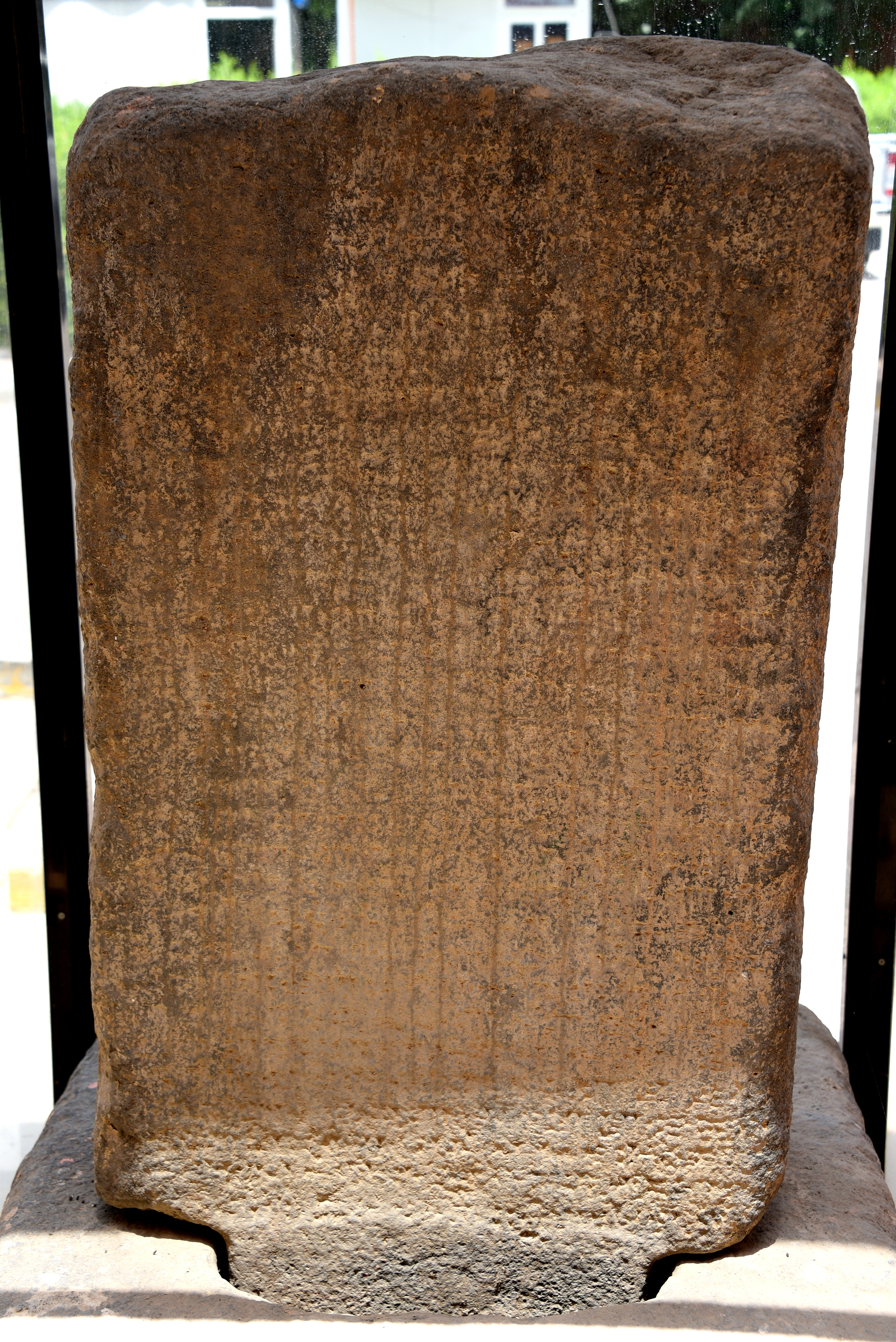
Topzawa stele. Bilingual inscriptions, Assyrian and Urartian. It narrates the military accomplishments of the Urartian king Rusas I and the clashes with the Assyrian army. Belonged to the kingdom of Musasir at Sidekan village, Erbil, Iraq. Erbil Civilization Museum, Iraqi Kurdistan

In 714 BC, King Sargon II led an offensive into Urartian territory. His early victories, especially at the Battle of Mount Waush and his ransack of the head Uratuan temple at Mushashir, almost caused total defeat for his Uratuan counterpart, King Rusa I.

== Urartian counterattack ==
After Sargon's death in 706 BC, King Rusa's successor, Argishti II, launched a major counterattack, with his forces driving the Assyrians back across the pre-war border and deep into Assyrian colonies in northwestern Iran, reconquering major towns and cities around Lake Urmia, including Mushashir, Ushnu, and Tepe.

== Assyrian victory ==
The borders of Urartu and its neighbors during the final years of its existence, 610–585 BC.

After the Uratuan victories during the early part of King Argishti II's reign, Urartu experienced a "Golden Age" characterized by a lengthy peace and economic prosperity throughout the remainder of Arghisti's reign and the entire rule of his successor, Rusa II. However, King Rusa III was repeatedly defeated by the Assyrians. This ultimately turned Urartu into an Assyrian client state, used as a buffer on the northern borders of this powerful empire.

== Aftermath ==
Both states did not last long after the end of the war. The Assyrian capital, Nineveh, was sacked and destroyed by a coalition of its former subject peoples, the Babylonians, Chaldeans, Medes, Scythians and Cimmerians, in 612 BC, with Assyria finally falling by 609 BC. The Medes and Scythians then turned on the remnants of Urartu, destroying it c. 590 BC.

== See also ==
- Military history of the Neo-Assyrian Empire
