= Sarduri =

Sarduri, also Sarduris, Sardur was the name of several kings of Urartu:

- Sarduri I (reign - 834 BC - 828 BC)
- Sarduri II (ruled 764-735 BC)
- Sarduri III
- Sarduri IV
