= Ararat =

Ararat or in Western Armenian Ararad may refer to:

== Personal names ==
- Ararat (Armenian: Արարատ), a common male first name for Armenians (pronounced Ararad in Western Armenian)
- Ararat or Araratian, a common family name for Armenians (pronounced Ararad, Araradian in Western Armenian). See Araratyan

== Places ==
=== Armenian Highland ===
- Mount Ararat, a mountain and a dormant volcanic cone in Turkey
  - Greater Ararat, the tallest peak in Turkey, part of Mount Ararat
  - Little Ararat, the sixth tallest peak in Turkey, part of Mount Ararat
- Ararat plain, along the Arax River, in Armenia
- Ararat Province, Armenia
  - Ararat, Armenia, a city in Ararat Province
  - Ararat (village), Armenia, a village in Ararat Province
- Ayrarat, a historical province of Armenia

=== Australia ===
- Ararat, Victoria, Australia
  - Ararat Airport, an airport 5 km south of Ararat, Victoria, Australia
  - Aradale Mental Hospital, also known as the Ararat Asylum
  - Ararat V/Line rail service, a regional passenger rail service operated by V/Line in Victoria, Australia
  - Ararat railway station
  - HM Prison Ararat, in Ararat, Victoria, Australia
- Rural City of Ararat, south-west Victoria, Australia
  - City of Ararat, a former local government area west-northwest of Melbourne
  - Shire of Ararat, a former local government area about 200 kilometres (124 mi) west-northwest of Melbourne

=== United States ===
- Ararat, City of Refuge, proposed by Mordecai Manuel Noah
- Ararat, North Carolina, an unincorporated community
- Ararat, Virginia, an unincorporated community
- Ararat Township, Pennsylvania
- Mount Ararat (Pennsylvania), the highest point in Wayne County, Pennsylvania
- Ararat River, in Virginia and North Carolina

== History ==
- Mountains of Ararat, referred to in the Bible
- Kingdom of Ararat, a variant name of the Iron Age kingdom of Urartu
- Republic of Ararat, a breakaway Kurdish state, 1927 to 1931
  - Ararat rebellion, 1930 uprising of the Kurds of Agn Province in Turkish Kurdistan against the Turkish Government
- Ararat, City of Refuge, An attempt by Mordecai Manuel Noah to create a Jewish homeland; a significant event in the history of Zionism.

== Associations ==
- Ararat Center for Strategic Research, academic research center and Armenian think tank on security issues
- Ararat Chapter, the Chicago chapter of the Armenian Youth Federation

== Business and economy ==
- Ararat (brandy), a brandy in Armenia
- Ararat International Airlines, now defunct Armenian airline company founded in 2010 and ceased operations in 2013.

== Media ==
- Ararat Quarterly, international quarterly of literature, history and culture published in New York City
- Der Ararat, German arts magazine published between 1918 and 1921
- Ararat, a 1983 novel by D.M. Thomas
- Ararat (film), a 2002 film directed by Atom Egoyan
- Ararat, a planet colonized by refugees of Resurgam in the Revelation Space series by Alastair Reynolds
- Ararat (novel), a 2017 novel by Christopher Golden
- Ararad (daily), Armenian language newspaper in Lebanon

== Religion ==
- Araratian Pontifical Diocese, the biggest diocese of the Armenian Apostolic Church with jurisdiction including the Armenian capital Yerevan and the Araradian Province

== Sports ==
=== Football clubs ===
- Ararat SC, Erbil, Iraq
- FC Ararat-Armenia Yerevan, Yerevan, Armenia
- FC Ararat Yerevan, Yerevan, Armenia
- FC Ararat Moscow, Moscow, Russia
- F.C. Ararat Tehran, Tehran, Iran
- FC Ararat Tallinn, Tallinn, Estonia
- FC Ararat Issy, Issy-les-Moulineaux, France
- FC Araks Ararat, Ararat, Armenia (originally FC Ararat)
- Ararad SC, or Ararad Sports Association, Lebanese Armenian sports and cultural organization

Others

- Ararat Stadium, Tehran, Iran
- Ararat Tehran BC, an Iranian basketball club based in Tehran, Iran
- Ararad Sports Association, Lebanese Armenian sports association

== Other uses ==
- Ararat anomaly, object appearing on photographs near the summit of Mount Ararat
- 96205 Ararat, an asteroid named after the mountain
- HMAS Ararat, the name of two ships in the Royal Australian Navy
- Ararat (EP), an EP by the Israeli metal band Orphaned Land
- Ararat, a fictional town in Hungary, a hometown of Dukay family, in the books written by Lajos Zilahy from 1947 until 1965
- Ararat, a fictional planet in the p Eridani solar system, in the book Absolution Gap by Alastair Reynolds
