= Battle of Mount Waush =

Ancient Near-eastern battle

- Part of Urartu–Assyria War
Date	714 BC
Location	Mount Waush (modern-day Mount Sahand) 37°43′48″N 46°30′0″E
Result	Assyrian Victory
Territorial changes	Urartu loses territory around Lake Urmia.

Belligerents
Assyria; Mannaea	Urartu; Zikirtu

Commanders and leaders
Sargon II; Sin-ahu-usur; Šarru-ēmuranni	Rusa I; Metatti

Casualties and losses
Minimal	Heavy; 260 royal kinsmen captured
- Location within Iran

The Battle of Mount Waush, also called the Battle of Mount Uaush took place in 714 BC between the Assyrian army under Sargon II and the forces of the Kingdom of Urartu under Rusa I. It was the decisive victory of Sargon's campaign against Urartu, resulting in the sack of the Urartian holy city of Musasir and Urartu's loss of several territories around Lake Urmia.

The fighting took place at Mount Waush (modern-day Mount Sahand, south of Tabriz).

== Background ==
The Iron Age Kingdom of Urartu began its rise to power in the mid-9th century BC. Within a century, the relatively new state had conquered the majority of what would later be known as the Armenian Highlands. The Assyrian king Tiglath-Pileser III saw the rising Kingdom of Urartu as a growing threat to the safety of his empire. The Assyrian leadership concluded that they had to end the threat through direct confrontation with the young kingdom.

During Sargon's reign, Urartu remained Assyria's main strategic rival in the north. In 715 BC, Urartu was severely weakened by an unsuccessful expedition against the Cimmerians, a nomadic people in the central Caucasus. The Cimmerians defeated the Urartian army and raided Urartian lands as far as the area immediately south-west of Lake Urmia. Ullusunu of Mannaea had by then declared his loyalty to Assyria. Rusa seized some of Ullusunu's fortresses and replaced him with Daiukku as the new king. Months later, Sargon invaded Mannaea, recaptured Ullusunu's fortresses and restored him to the throne. Sargon also received the tribute of Ianzu, king of Nairi, another former Urartian vassal. Preparing for a campaign against Rusa, Sargon defeated some minor rebels in Media. In Anatolia, Urik of Quwê changed his allegiance from Sargon to Midas of Phrygia and began sending envoys to Rusa. To prevent the formation of a northern alliance, Sargon attacked Quwê, defeating Urik and recapturing some cities that had fallen to Midas. Quwê was abolished as a vassal kingdom and annexed.

Suspecting an Assyrian invasion, Rusa kept most of his army by Lake Urmia in the territory of the allied Kingdom of Zikirtu close to the Assyrian border, which was already fortified against Assyrian invasion.

== Prelude ==
In 714 BC, Sargon set out from Kalhu, then the capital, sometime in late June or early July and travelled east to the province of Mazamua to review the forces that had assembled there. The Assyrians had chosen a summer departure because it was the only time of the year when the Zagros mountain routes were completely clear of snow. It also meant that by the time the army reached Urartian territory around early autumn, the granaries of enemy towns would have been full as the inhabitants would have stored all their grain for the winters. These granaries were central to the Assyrian army's survival. Once the army had fully assembled in Mazamua, Sargon moved across the Zagros Mountains into the Assyrian province of Parsua, which corresponds to the modern-day Kurdistan Province of Iran. Sargon then advanced his forces into the Kingdom of Mannaea which was a vassal of Assyria. King Ullusunu was expected to provide for Sargon's army. The Assyrian forces then departed from the Mannaean fortress of Panzish and entered Zikirtian territory.

The King of Urartu, Rusa, and his forces assembled for battle in a pass on Mount Waush, from which he sent a messenger to Sargon, requesting battle.

== The Battlefield ==
Modern day Mount Sahand, known to the Ancient Assyrians as Mount Waush.

The Urartians had chosen the pass on Mount Waush because of its geography which they intended on using to limit the Assyrian army's power. The Urartian army had taken up positions in the gorges of Waush, where they occupied the heights towards which the gorge stretched, meaning that had the Assyrians entered the gorge, they wouldn't have been able to reach the Urartians, who would have struck them from above.

== Battle ==
Due to the unfavourable terrain, the Assyrians likely decided to avoid a pitched battle, and instead aimed to use the Urartians' chosen area against them. Due to the seemingly inaccessible mountains at the rear of the Urartian troops, the Urartian commanders did not think to secure their rear, meaning they had deployed the main forces towards the front line in depth, along the narrow gorge. It was also difficult for the Urartian army to freely move within the same restricted area that the Urartians had planned to use to limit the movement of the Assyrian army.

The Assyrians, likely aware of the Urartian vulnerabilities, chose to attack the Urartians from the mountains behind them, to get as close to Rusa's camp as possible. To achieve this outflanking manoeuvre, selected troops were detached from the army. These included the royal cavalry guard led by Sargon himself, and Sin-ahu-usur's Pirru unit. Before the main Assyrian forces had taken up their positions, the detachment led by Sargon travelled via a narrow mountain route and managed to occupy a favourable position at the rear of the Urartians, close to their camp, without Rusa and his allies noticing. The Urartian camp was Sargon's chosen target, as he could directly attack Rusa and his men. The attack on the Urartian camp likely took place before the main forces could have a pitched battle, and was started by Sin-ahu-usur's archers who fired at Rusa's horsemen. The unexpected shooting would have inflicted heavy losses on the Urartians while also causing a commotion in the camp. The shooting of arrows was followed by an attack on the camp by Sargon's cavalry.

Rusa and his royal regiment were encircled by the Assyrian detachment. Because of this, the Urartian commanders were isolated from the main forces, which incited panic in the Urartian ranks. The main Assyrian forces then began an attack on the Urartian frontline. The Urartians, deprived of their commanders and shocked by the course of the events, offered little resistance against the Assyrians and began to retreat in disorder towards the camp before fleeing. The fleeing Urartians were then massacred by the pursuing Assyrians. The remaining soldiers had no other goal but save the life of their king, which they achieved after suffering heavy losses. A total of 260 of Rusa's kinsmen were captured, alongside eunuchs, commanders, counsellors, governors and horsemen.

The Assyrians then launched an attack on Urartu's Zikirtian allies led by king Metatti, whose troops had taken up a separate position to the Urartians. The Zikirtians did not offer any organised resistance and fled the battle and the Assyrian cavalry pursued them from Mount Waush to Mount Zimur.

== Aftermath ==
After this battle, no further battles between the Urartians and Assyrians took place for the rest of Sargon's reign. Following Waush, the Assyrians campaigned further into Zikirtu, where Sargon claimed to have captured 12 fortified Zikirtian cities and 84 smaller towns. This was then followed by a successful Assyrian campaign to seven Urartian provinces. It is unclear whether such an invasion into Urartian territory had always been the goal of the 714 campaign, or whether it was instead a reaction to the decisive victory at Mount Waush. The campaign concluded with the plunder of the holy city of Musasir.
