= Urartu (disambiguation) =

Urartu was an Iron Age kingdom discovered in the 19th century.

Urartu may also refer to the following Armenian entities:

== Sports clubs ==
- FC Urartu, an association football club based in Yerevan
  - Urartu Stadium, their home stadium
  - Urartu Training Centre, their training ground
- Urartu BC, a basketball club based in Yerevan
- Urartu Yerevan, an ice hockey club based in Yerevan

== See also ==
- Ararat (disambiguation)
- Urartian language, spoken by the inhabitants of Urartu
- Urartu–Assyria War
