= Rusa reservoir =

Ancient reservoir in Armenia

Rusa Reservoir
- Location: Eastern Armenia
- Type: Reservoir
- Primary inflows: Alaini River
- Basin countries: Armenia

Rusa reservoir is an ancient reservoir located in current eastern Armenia. It was constructed by King Menua to meet the water demand when he moved the Kingdom of Urartu from Tushpa to the Rusa city in 700 B.C. An artificial lake was created by constructing two dams to collect water from Alaini river. The inscriptions by King Rusa were found near the reservoir to estimate the age of the reservoir. The reservoir is still under partial operation.

The original northern dam is assumed to be 18 m high and 60 m long and the dam wing of 3m high and 200 m long. It was damaged in 1891 and reconstructed in 1895 to a height of 3 m and in 1952 to a height of 5.40 m. The water released from this dam was directed to Rusahinili hill.

The southern dam is 5 m high, 27 m thick and 55 m long and is constructed with rocks and earthen core.
