= Erimena =

King of Urartu

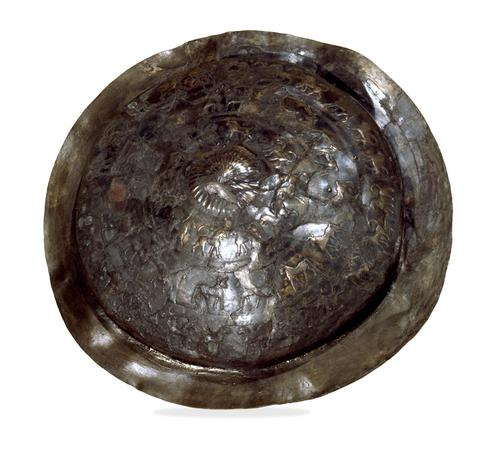
- Inscribed Urartian shield mentioning Erimena

King of Urartu
- Reign: 625–605 BC
- Predecessor: Sarduri III
- Successor: Rusa III
- Issue: Rusa III
- Father: Rusa II

Erimena, according to tradition, was the twelfth king of Urartu and reigned from 625 to 605 BC. He was the successor of Sarduri III and father of Rusa III, who ruled Urartu from 610-590 B.C. Little is known about Erimena; his name was mentioned in an inscribed bronze shield found at Toprakkale by Hormuzd Rassam in 1880 that is now located in the British Museum. Erimena, according to a Babylonian chronicle, held an expedition in the mountainous region of Bit Hanounia, under the rule of Nabopolassar. He also suffered many attacks from the Babylonians which led to the decline of Urartu.

== History ==
The Kingdom of Urartu (yellow) from 610 to 585 BC.

There are several possible interpretations of Erimena's rise to power. Igor M. Diakonoff believed that Erimena was the brother of Sarduri III and ruled the state due to the fact that, at the time of the death of Sarduri III, his son Sarduri IV had not yet reached adulthood. Erimena is also known from a seal impression of one of his possible governors, preserved on a stone tablet from Karmir-Blur. In later works, N. V. Harutyunyan, relying on new data from the archaeological excavations at Karmir-Blur, indicated that there are no grounds for such claims and that Erimena simply ascended the throne after Sarduri IV. At the same time, the possibility remains that Erimena was the son of Sarduri IV, and also that Erimena could have been overthrown from the throne by Sarduri IV around 620 BC. and become the founder of a new Urartian dynasty. In addition, there is also a possibility that Sarduri IV was overthrown by Rusa III, the son of Erimena, and Erimena himself was never king (similar to how Sarduri I, the son of Lutipri, ascended the throne after Aram). Modern science does not have sufficient information to unambiguously resolve these issues. In the first half of the 20th century, Ivan Meshchaninov suggested that the patronymic of Rusa III does not come from the name of "Erimena", but the nationality "Armenian.” This assumption was also expressed by the British historian Richard David Barnett, but later rejected due to the emergence of new data. This assumption, combined with folk legends, gave rise to the opinion that from 620 BC, the Armenian dynasty already ruled in Urartu. Modern science, however, rejects this possibility for both linguistic and historical reasons. Robert Hewsen states that there may be a possible connection between the name of Erimena and the legendary figure Armenak mentioned by Movses Khorenatsi.

== See also ==
- List of kings of Urartu
