= Argišti II =

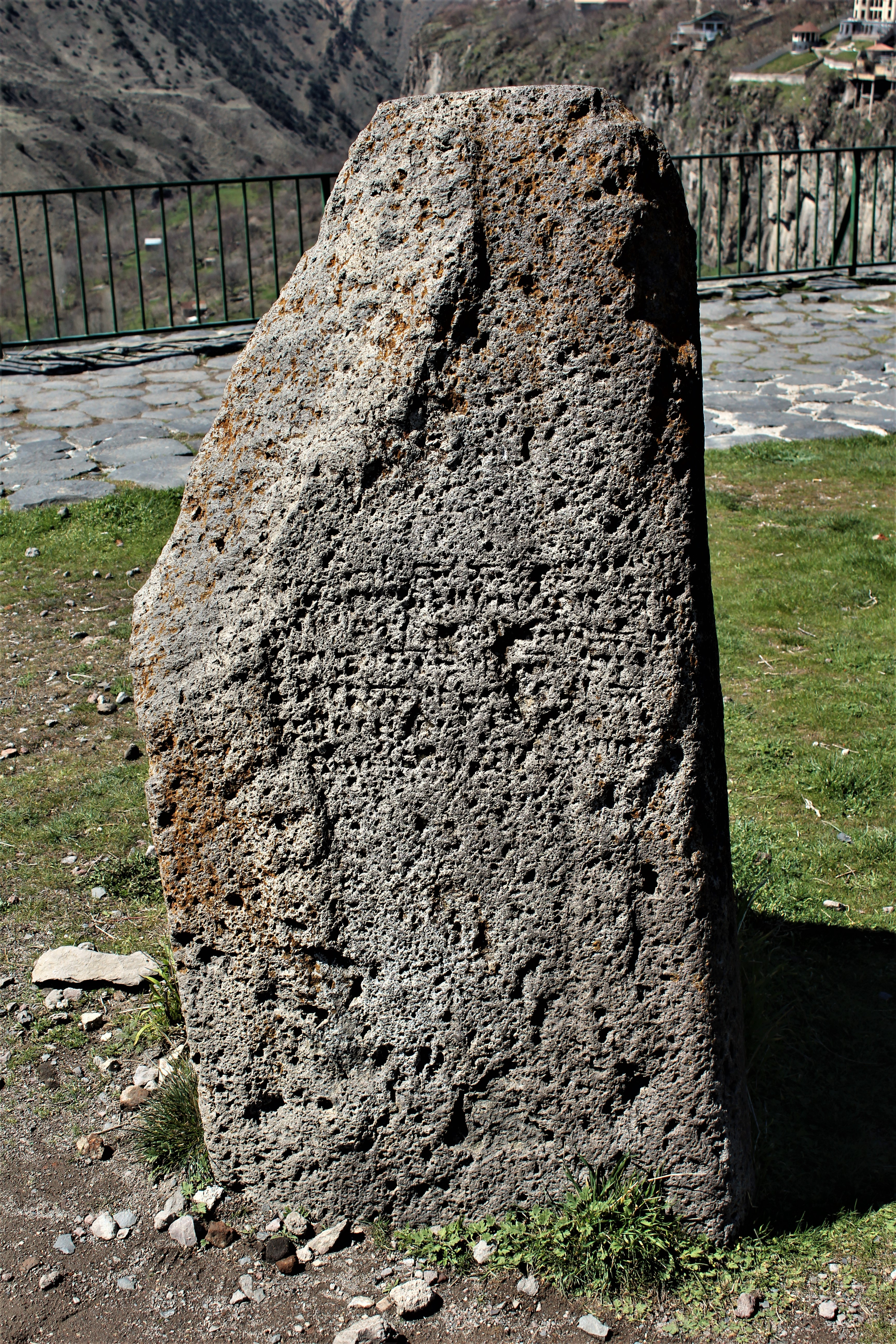

King of Urartu
- Reign: 714–680 BC
- Predecessor: Rusa I
- Successor: Rusa II
- Issue: Rusa II
- Father: Rusa I

Argišti II was king of Urartu from 714 BC to 680 BC. He succeeded his father, King Rusa I. During the Urartu-Assyria War, Argišti was responsible for orchestrating major Urartian counter-offensives against the invading Assyrians. His forces drove the Assyrians back across the pre-war border and deep into the Assyrian heartlands, reconquering major towns and cities around Lake Urmia, including Mushashir, Ushnu, and Tepe, and conquering the territory as far south as the city of Nimrud on the Tigris River. These victories forced the Assyrians to accept a lengthy peace and cede large tracts of territory north of the Tigris. The remainder of Argišti's lengthy reign was characterized by a "Golden Age", a period of lengthy peace and economic prosperity, which carried into the reigns of Argišti's two successors, his son Rusa II and his grandson Sarduri III.

Although the region of Urartu had been controlled by the Assyrians following conflicts, Argišti II was still able to expand his influence further east, as inscriptions in Iranian Azerbaijan have shown.

== See also ==
- List of kings of Urartu
