= Rusa IV =

King of Urartu, 590–585 BC

King of Urartu
- Reign: 590–585 BC
- Predecessor: Sarduri IV
- Died: 585 BC
- Father: Rusa III

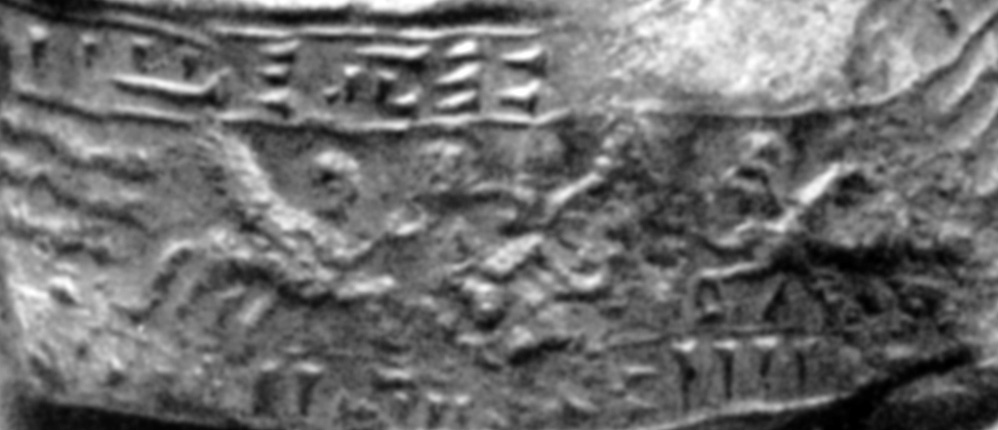
Royal tablet bearing the name of Rusa IV

Rusa IV (died 585 BC) was king of Urartu from 590 BC to 585 BC. Rusa IV was the son and a successor of Rusa III, and the successor of Sarduri IV. His name is mentioned on a number of clay tablets found at Karmir Blur (near Yerevan, Armenia), including tablets bearing his own royal inscriptions. However, almost nothing is known about his reign. He is possibly the Hrachya (Armenian: Հրաչյա) mentioned by the Armenian historian Moses of Khorene.

== See also ==
- List of kings of Urartu
