= Ayanis =

Ancient Urartian fortress in Turkey

- Rusahinili Eidurukai ("The City of Rusa in front of Mount Eiduru")
- Ayanis Kalesi, Ağartı Kalesi
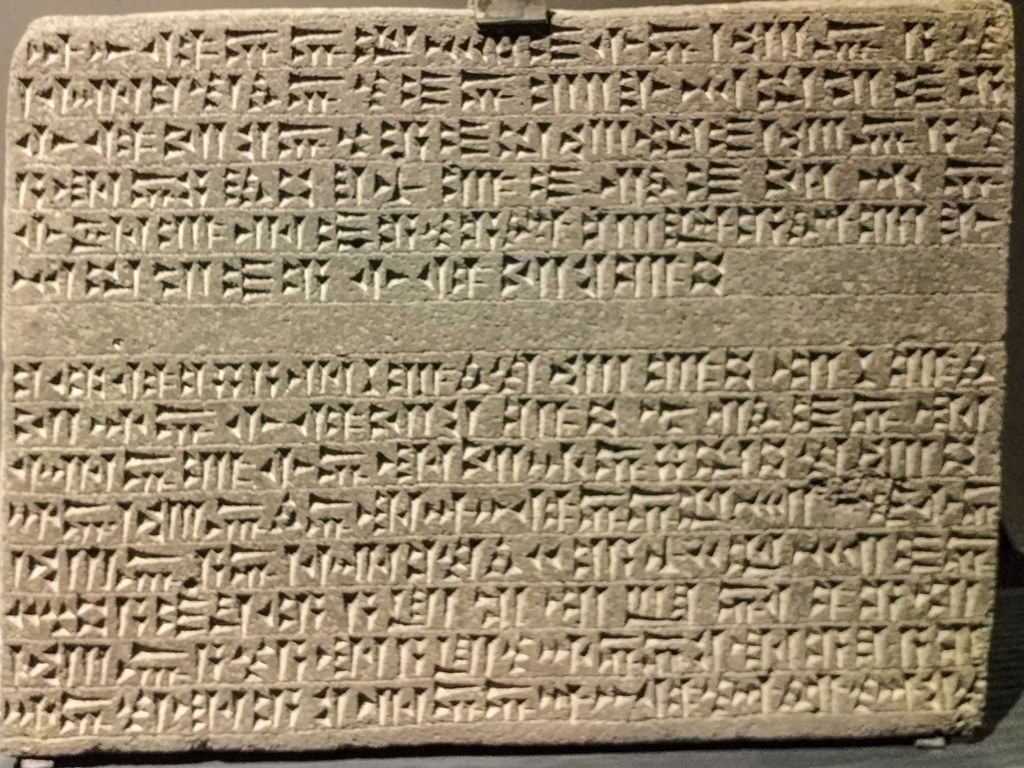
- Inscription of the fortress of Ayanis

- Location within Turkey
- 38.7083055466°N 43.2113185884°E
- Type: fortress, temple, outer city
- Cultures: Urartu
- Location: Van, Turkey

History
- Built: 673-72 BC
- Built by: Rusa II

Site notes
- Area: 80 ha (200 acres), thereof the fortress ca. 150 x 400 meters
- Excavation dates: 1989-today
- Public access: No

Ayanis (Turkish: Ayanis Kalesi) is an Urartian archaeological site close to lake Van, Turkey. It was originally built as a fortress by Urartian king Rusa II and named after him Rusahinili Eidurukai ("The City of Rusa in front of Mount Eiduru"). The site was occupied during the Iron Age II period and then again in the Middle Ages between the tenth and eleventh century.

== History ==
Ayanis was the last fortress built by Urartian king Rusa II around 673/72 BC. It was then known under the name Rusahinili Eidurukai ("The City of Rusa in front of Mount Eiduru") according to an inscription found in front of the monumental gate (Mount Eiduru can be identified with the nearby Mount Süphan).

Between 653 and 650 BC, an earthquake destroyed the fortress and the outer town, with additional destruction caused by the fires from the furnaces within the settlement.

The site was again occupied during the Middle Ages between the tenth and eleventh centuries CE.

== Archaeology ==
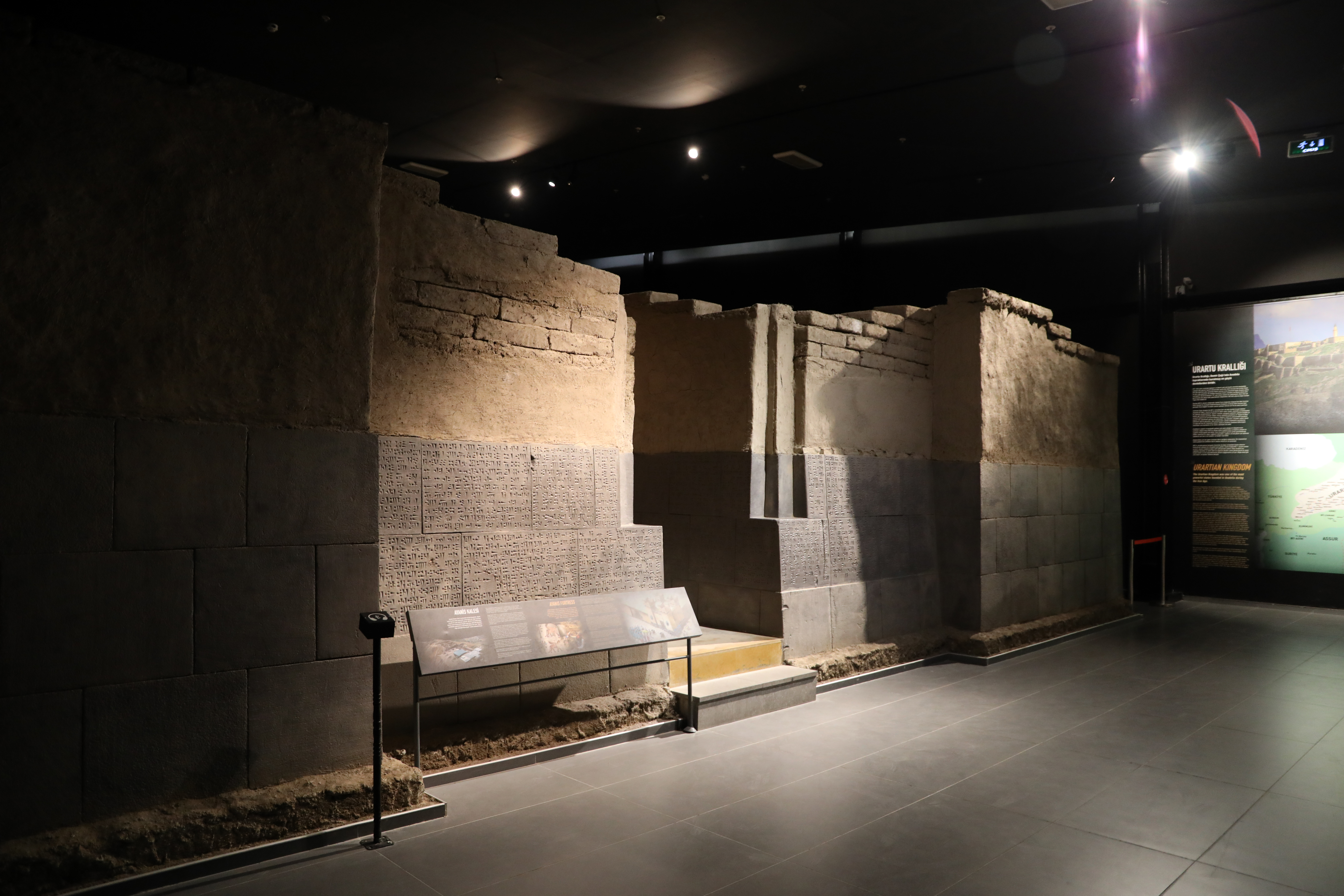
Reconstruction of the temple of Haldi of the fortress of Ayanis in the museum of Van

Exploration of the site started in 1989 after which excavations started. Parts of the temple area are supposed to be made available to visitors under the "Heritage for the Future" project.

== Bibliography ==
- Çilingiroğlu, Altan (2012). "Ayanis: An Iron Age Site in the East". In Steadman, Sharon R.; McMahon, Gregory (eds.). The Oxford Handbook of Ancient Anatolia. Oxford University Press. pp. 1057–1068.
- Çilingiroğlu, Altan (2016). "Did Weapons Dedicated to the Urartian God of Haldi Help to Save the Ayanis Fortress?". In Egg, Markus; Naso, Alessandro; Rollinger, Robert (eds.). Waffen für die Götter - Waffenweihung in Archäologie und Geschichte. Mainz: Verlag des Römisch-Germanischen Zentralmuseums.
- Çilingiroğlu, Altan (1 January 2018). "Ayanis Fortress:The Day After the Disaster". URARTIANS: A CIVILIZATION IN THE EASTERN ANATOLIA.Symposium I:The Proceedings of the 1st International Symposium held at İstanbul in 13–15 October 2014.Rezan Has Museum.: 14–26.
- Çilingiroğlu, Altan (2019). "Ayanis Fortress: only a Military Fortress or More?". Over the Mountains and Far Away: Studies in Near Eastern history and archaeology presented to Mirjo Salvini on the occasion of his 80th birthday: 120–133. doi:10.2307/J.CTVNDV9F0.18.
