= List of kings of Urartu =

This article lists the kings of Urartu (Ararat or Kingdom of Van), an Iron Age kingdom centered on Lake Van in eastern Asia Minor.

== Kings ==
No.	Name	Picture	Reign dates	Notes
1	Arame (Aramu, Arama)		858–844 BC	
2	Lutipri		844–834 BC (?)	Unclear if he was king of Uratu.
3	Sarduri I (Sarduris I, Sedur I, Asiduri I)		834–828 BC	Son of Lutipri.; Known in Assyrian sources as Ishtarduri.; Moved the capital to Tushpa.; Expanded the fortress of Van.; Possibly established new dynasty.
4	Ishpuini (Ishpuinis, Ispuini)		828–810 BC	Son of Sarduri I.; Expanded the empire and conquered Musasir.
5	Menua (Menuas, Minua)		810–785 BC	Son of Ishpuini.; Initially ruled jointly with his father Ishpuini and later jointly ruled with his son Inushpua.; Greatly expanded the kingdom.; Organized the centralized administrative structure.; Fortified a number of cities and founded fortresses.; Developed a national canal and irrigation system.
6	Inushpua		788–786 BC	Son of Menua.; Co-ruled with his father.; Possibly killed in battle.
7	Argishti I (Argishtis I, Argishtish I, Argisti I)		785–763 BC	Son of Menua.; Fortified the empire's frontier.; Founded Erebuni (modern-day Yerevan).
8	Sarduri II		763–735 BC	Son of Argishti I.; Maximum expansion.; Zenith of Urartian power.; Archaeologists have discovered jars that once contained wheat, oil and wine, in the ruins of a castle the Turks call "Chavez Tepe", built by Uzira Sardouri II. Each buried jar with orifice covered with wedge engraved ceramic lids can hold 300 kg.
9	Rusa I (Rusas, Ursa)		735–714 BC	Son of Sarduri II.; Assyrian and Cimmerian attacks.; Assyrian King Tiglath-Pileser III destroyed castle of Rusa, which has been recently discovered under Lake Van, Turkey.
10	Melartua		714 BC	Son of Rusa I.; Briefly served as king after his father's defeat.; Subsequently killed by Urartian nobles.
11	Argishti II		714–680 BC	Son of Rusa I.
12	Rusa II (known to Assyrian king as Yaya or Iaya)		680–639 BC	Son of Argishti II.
13	Sarduri III		639–635 BC	Son of Rusa II.
14	Erimena		635–629 BC (?)	Son of Rusa II.
15	Rusa III		629–615 BC	Son of Erimena.
16	Sarduri IV		615–595 BC	Son of Rusa III.
17	Rusa IV		595–585 BC	Son of Rusa III.; Raids of Medes and Scythians.

== See also ==
- List of Mesopotamian dynasties
