= Ararat, City of Refuge =

19th-century plan for a Jewish homeland

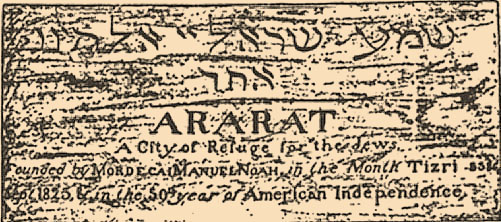
Illustration of the site's marker

Ararat, established as a city of refuge for the Jewish nation, was founded in 1825 by New York politician and playwright Mordecai Manuel Noah, who purchased most of Grand Island, a 27-square-mile (70 km^{2}) island near Buffalo, New York. It failed to be a Jewish city.

Noah led a ceremonious procession to the site and laid a markstone with the sayings in Hebrew and English:

Hear, O Israel, the Lord our God is one Lord; Ararat, A City of Refuge for the Jews, Founded by Mordecai Manuel Noah, in the Month Tishrei, September 1825 and in the 50th year of American Independence.

The idea did not attract many followers and Mordecai Noah started to advocate the creation of a Jewish state in Palestine, then a part of the Ottoman Empire.

In his short story "Noah's Ark", British author Israel Zangwill retells the story of Ararat.

== See also ==
- Zionism
- Proposals for a Jewish state
