= Rusa III =

King of Urartu

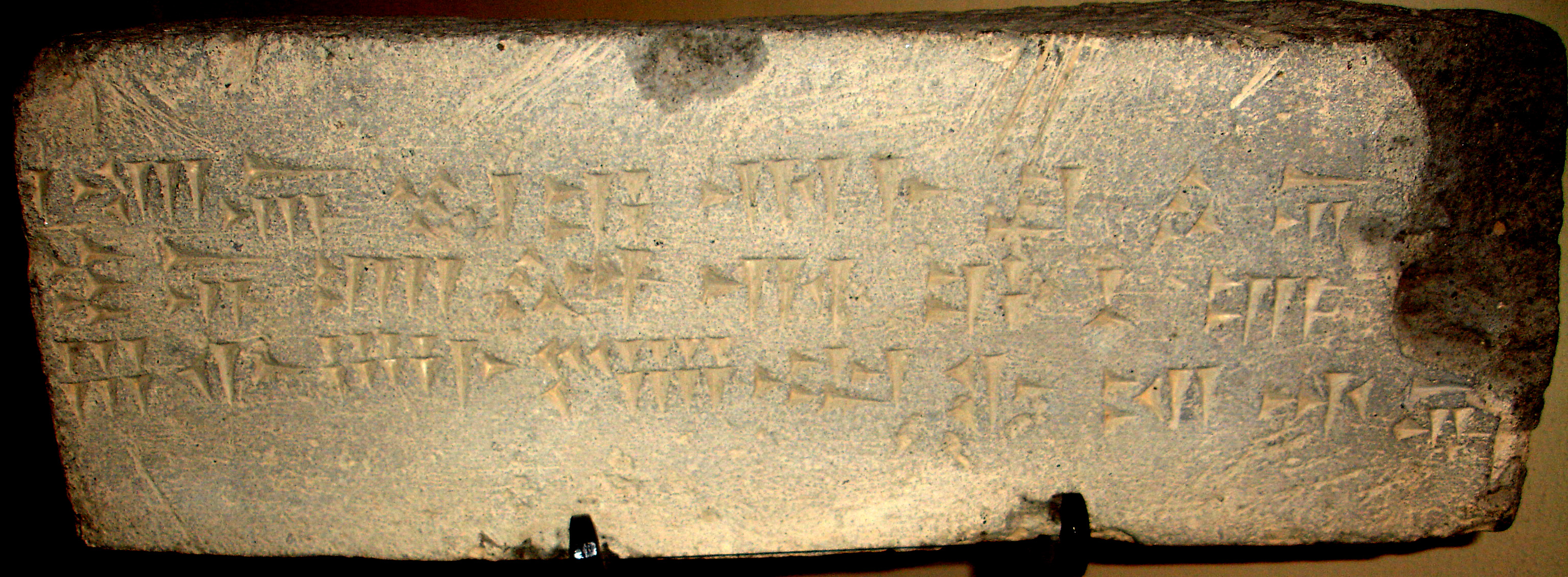
- Urartian language stone. Erebuni museum, Yerevan

King of Urartu
- Reign: 629–615 BC or 590 BC
- Predecessor: Erimena or Sarduri III
- Successor: Sarduri IV
- Issue: Sarduri IV
- Father: Erimena
- Mother: Cirane

Rusa III was king of Urartu. He was called "Rusa Erimenahi" ("the son of Erimena"). He may have been the nephew or cousin of Rusa II. Little is known about his reign; his name was inscribed on a massive granary at Armavir and on a series of bronze shields from the temple of Khaldi found at Rusahinili, now held in the British Museum. There is considerable confusion over the identity of Rusa III, when he ruled, and his relationship to other kings or even the actual dates he ruled.

Rusa was the father of Sarduri IV.

== See also ==
- List of kings of Urartu
