= Mordecai Manuel Noah =

American diplomat and utopian writer (1785–1851)

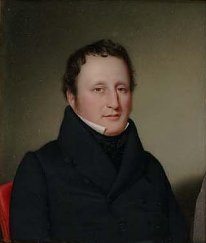
- Portrait by John Wood Dodge, 1834
- Born: July 14, 1785; Philadelphia, Pennsylvania, US
- Died: March 22, 1851 (aged 65); New York City, US
- Occupations: Diplomat, journalist, playwright
- Known for: Jewish toleration

Mordecai Manuel Noah (July 14, 1785, Philadelphia, Pennsylvania – May 22, 1851, New York, New York) was an American sheriff, playwright, diplomat, journalist, and utopian. He was born in a family of mixed Ashkenazi and Portuguese Sephardic ancestry and was the grandson of Jonas Phillips. He was the most important Jewish lay leader in New York in the early 19th century, and one of the first Jews born in the United States to reach national prominence. He is best known for envisioning a homeland for the Jewish people in upstate New York. Long taken by the idea of a Jewish territorial restoration, in 1825 Noah purchased a tract of land on Grand Island in the Niagara River near Buffalo, New York, which he named Ararat. He erected a monument on the island and envisioned the establishment of a Jewish colony there. Though the proposal elicited much discussion, the attempt was not a success. After the failure of the Ararat experience, Noah turned more strongly to the idea of Palestine as a national home for Jews. As the best-known American Jew of his time, Noah in 1840 delivered the principal address at a meeting at B’nai Jeshurun in New York protesting the Damascus Affair.

== Diplomat ==
In 1811, he was appointed by President James Madison as consul at Riga, then part of Imperial Russia, but declined, and, in 1813, was nominated Consul to the Kingdom of Tunis, where he rescued American citizens kept as slaves by Moroccan slave owners. On April 25, 1816 (some sources give 1815), Noah was removed from his position. In the words of U.S. Secretary of State James Monroe, his religion was "an obstacle to the exercise of [his] Consular function." The incident caused outrage among Jews and non-Jews alike.

Noah sent many letters to the White House trying to get an answer as to why they felt his religion should be a justifiable reason for taking the office of Consul away. He had done well as consul and had even been able to accommodate the United States' request to secure the release of some hostages being held in Algiers. Noah never received a legitimate answer as to why the White House took the office of Consul away from him. The lack of a response worried Noah, as he was concerned that his removal would set a precedent that would block Jews from holding publicly elected or officially granted offices within the United States in the future.

The true reason for his recall was because the administration assessed that the ransom paid was too high.

Noah protested and gained letters from John Adams, Thomas Jefferson, and James Madison supporting church-state separation and tolerance for Jews. Prominent Jewish leader Isaac Harby, a forerunner of Reform Judaism, was moved to write, in a letter to Monroe,

[Jews] are by no means to be considered as a religious sect, tolerated by the government. They constitute a portion of the People. They are, in every respect, woven in and compacted with the citizens of the Republic.

== Career ==
Noah moved to New York, where he founded and edited The National Advocate, The New York Enquirer (later merged into the New York Courier and Enquirer), The Evening Star, and The Sunday Times newspapers. Noah was known to use his power as an editor of The National Advocate and law enforcement powers as a sheriff to personally shut down rival plays produced by black theater groups that drew attention and revenue away from his own productions, with some reports that the performers continued to recite their lines as they were dragged from the stage to their cells.

In 1819, Noah's most successful play, She Would Be a Soldier, was produced. That play has since established Noah as America's first important Jewish writer. She Would Be a Soldier is now included in college level anthologies.

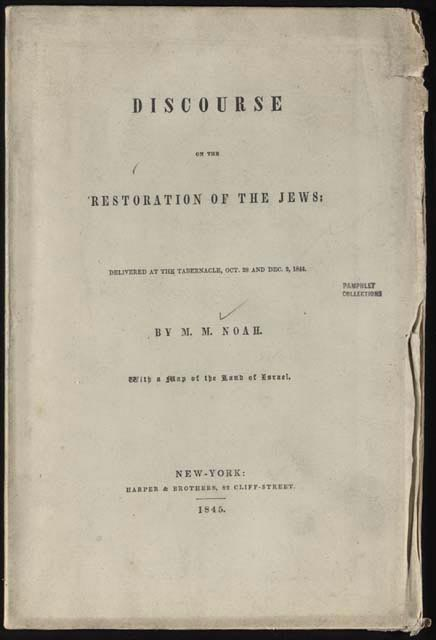
1844 Discourse on the Restoration of the Jews by M.M. Noah, page 1. The page 2 shows the map of the Land of Israel

In 1825, with virtually no support from anyone — not even his fellow Jews — in a precursor to modern Zionism, he tried to found a Jewish "refuge" at Grand Island in the Niagara River, to be called "Ararat," after Mount Ararat, the Biblical resting place of Noah's Ark. He purchased land on Grand Island for $4.38 (~$125.00 in 2025) per acre to build a refuge for Jews of all nations. He had brought with him a cornerstone which read "Ararat, a City of Refuge for the Jews, founded by Mordecai M. Noah in the Month of Tishrei, 5586 (Sept. 1825) & in the 50th Year of American Independence."

Noah also shared the belief, among various others, that some Native American "Indians" were from the Lost Tribes of Israel, on which he wrote the Discourse on the Evidences of the American Indians being the Descendants of the Lost Tribes of Israel. In his Discourse on the Restoration of the Jews, Noah proclaimed his faith that the Jews would return and rebuild their ancient homeland and called on America to take the lead in this endeavor.

On September 2, 1825, soon after Noah's arrival in Buffalo from New York, thousands of Christians and a smattering of Jews assembled for a historic event. Noah led a large procession headed by Masons, a New York militia company, and municipal leaders to St. Paul's Episcopal Church. Here, there was a brief ceremony — including a singing of the psalms in Hebrew — the cornerstone was laid on the communion table, and the new proclamation establishing the refuge was read. "Proclamation – day ended with music, cannonade and libation. 24 guns, recessional, masons retired to the Eagle Tavern, all with no one ever having set foot on Grand Isle." This was the beginning and the end of Noah's venture: he lost heart and returned to New York two days later without once having set foot on the island. The cornerstone was taken out of the audience chamber of the church and laid against the back of the building. It is now on permanent display at the Buffalo Historical Society in Buffalo, New York. Afterwards, despite the failure of his project, he developed the idea of settling the Jews in Palestine and, as such, he can be considered a forerunner of modern Zionism.

From 1827 to 1828, Noah led New York City's Tammany Hall political machine.

In his writings he began his career as an opponent of the expansion of slavery. “How can Americans be engaged in this traffic,” he once asked, regarding the slave trade, “men whose birthright is liberty, whose eminent peculiarity is freedom?” But with age Noah became such an outspoken opponent of emancipation that the first-ever black newspaper in America, Freedom's Journal, was specifically founded to counter Noah's venom.

MacArthur Award-winning cartoonist Ben Katchor fictionalized Noah's scheme for Grand Island in his The Jew of New York. Noah is also a minor character in Gore Vidal's 1973 novel Burr.

The modern edition of Noah's writings is The Selected Writings of Mordecai Noah edited by Michael Schuldiner and Daniel Kleinfeld, and published by Greenwood Press.

== Bibliography ==
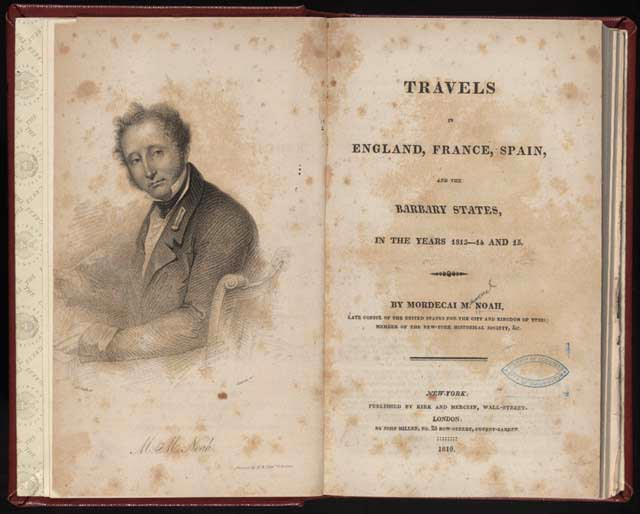
Noah's book Travels in England, France, Spain, and the Barbary States, in the Years 1813-14 and 15

- 1819: She Would be a Soldier; or the Plains of Chippewa
- 1813 – 1814: Travels in England, France, Spain, and the Barbary States
- 1837 : Discourse of the Evidence of the American Indians being the descendants of the Lost Tribes of Israël
- 1844: Discourse on the Restoration of the Jews

== Sources ==
- Selig Adler & Thomas E. Connolly. From Ararat to Suburbia: the History of the Jewish Community of Buffalo (Philadelphia: the Jewish Publication Society of America, 1960, Library of Congress Number 60-15834).
- Mordecai Manuel Noah: Travels in England, France, Spain, and the Barbary States: In the Years 1813-14 and 15
- Isaac Goldberg, Major Noah: American-Jewish Pioneer, The Jewish Publication Society of Philadelphia, 1936.
- Michael Schuldiner and Daniel J. Kleinfeld, The Selected Writings of Mordecai Noah, Greenwood Press, 1999.
- IsraIsland. Nava Semel, 2005.
