= Araratyan =

Araratyan or in Western Armenian Araradian (Armenian: Արարատյան) is an Armenian surname. Notable people with the surname include:

- Sargis Araratyan (1886–1943), Armenian politician
- Khachatur Araratian (1876–1937), Russian army officer

== See also ==
- Araratov
