= Sarduri IV =

King of Urartu
- Reign: 615–595 BC
- Predecessor: Rusa III
- Successor: Rusa IV
- Father: Rusa III
- Mother: Hucan

Sarduri IV (Armenian: Սարդուր IV, unknown–595 BC) was one of the last kings of Urartu, reigning from 615 to 595 BC.

Sarduri IV was the son and successor of Rusa III. Little is known about his reign, except that his kingdom was being invaded by Assyrian forces from the south, east and west, as well as by the Medes from the east and the Scythians from the north.

He died without issue and was succeeded by his brother Rusa IV.

== See also ==
- List of kings of Urartu
