= Musasir =

Ancient city of Urartu

Muṣaṣir (Assyrian cuneiform: ^{KUR}Mu-ṣa-ṣir and variants, including Mutsatsir, Akkadian for Exit of the Serpent/Snake), in Urartian Ardini was an ancient city of Urartu, attested in Assyrian sources of the 9th and 8th centuries BC.

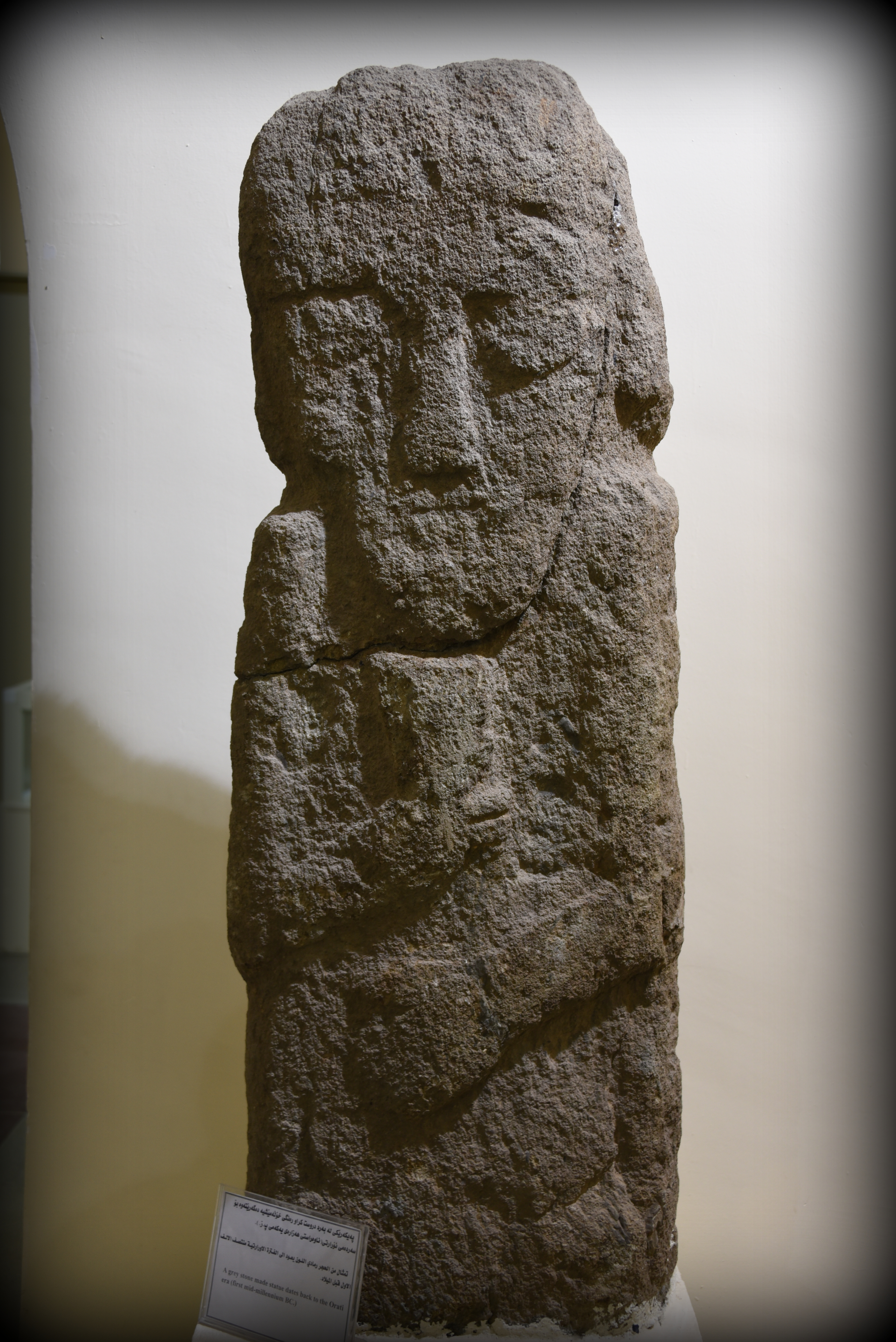
Sandstone statue of a man or deity. The statue belonged to the Musasir Kingdom. Urartian period, 1st millennium BC. Precise provenance of excavation is unknown. Erbil Civilization Museum, Iraqi Kurdistan.

It was acquired by the Urartian King Ishpuini ca. 800 BC (see the Kelashin Stele). The city's tutelary deity was ^{d}Ḫaldi.

The city's location is not known with certainty, although there are a number of hypotheses, all in the general area of 36°N 46°E, in the Zagros south of Lake Urmia. François Thureau-Dangin tentatively located it at Mudjesir, 10 km west of Topzawa. Reza Heidari, an archaeologist of the "Cultural Heritage and Tourism Organization" of Iran's West Azarbaijan Province claims Rabat city near Sardasht, Iran as the location of Muṣaṣir. H. F. B. Lynch claimed that it was close to the modern town of Rawandiz in Iraqi Kurdistan.

Urartologist Paul Zimansky speculated that the Urartians (or at least the ruling family) may have emigrated northwest into the Lake Van region from Musasir.

== Temple ==
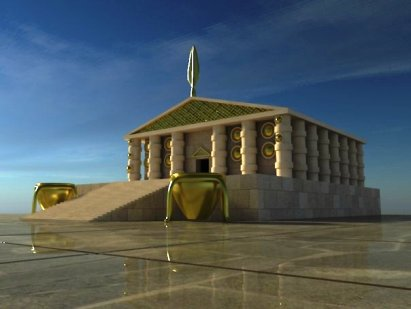
Recreation of Musasir temple

The Musasir temple, built in 825 BC, was an important temple in Musasir, the holy city of Urartu. The Temple at Musasir appears in an Assyrian bas-relief which adorned the palace of King Sargon II at Khorsabad, to commemorate his victory over "the seven kings of Urartu" in 714 BC.

(1802 - 1870) During the early 1850s, the British Assyrian Excavation Fund entered the field under William Kennett Loftus and many antiquities and accurate drawings of wall sculptures were apportioned between the British Museum and the Louvre. However, a convoy of antiquities was attacked by Arab robbers while being shipped down the Tigris River, and today lies buried somewhere in the bed of that river. That particular bas-relief was copied at its original location in the palace onto a drawing by Eugene Flandin(2) as Botta's chief artist.

During these Assyrian campaigns, Bianili (Urartu) was ruled by Sarduri and later by his son Rusa (Armenian: Հրաչյա Hrachya, according to Movses Khorenatsi) with the capital at Tushpa (Classical Armenian: Տոսպ Tosp) on the eastern shore of Lake Van.

During Rusa I's reign (735-714 BC), Musasir was governed by a king named Urzana.

== Potential locations ==
- Altintepe: Since 1959, the Historical Society and the Department of Antiquities have conducted excavations in the Yerznka area, west of Karin. Here at Altintepe was revealed an Urartian temple and other monuments. Only the foundations of the temple are in view. Obviously this is not the temple of Musasir as it is located far away from the concerned area.
- Rabat Tepe: Recently a site excavated in Iran, which is called Rabat Tepe and located at the southwestern side of Lake Urmia, was identified as Musasir.
- At a site called Gund-i Topzawa north of Erbil in Iraqi Kurdistan.
