= Toprakkale (castle) =

Ancient Urartian fortress built by Rusa I

Coordinates: 38°31′14″N 43°24′14″E

Rusahinili ("city of (King) Rusa I)", modern Toprakkale (Turkey), is an ancient Urartian fortress built by Rusa I, located near the modern city of Van in eastern Turkey.

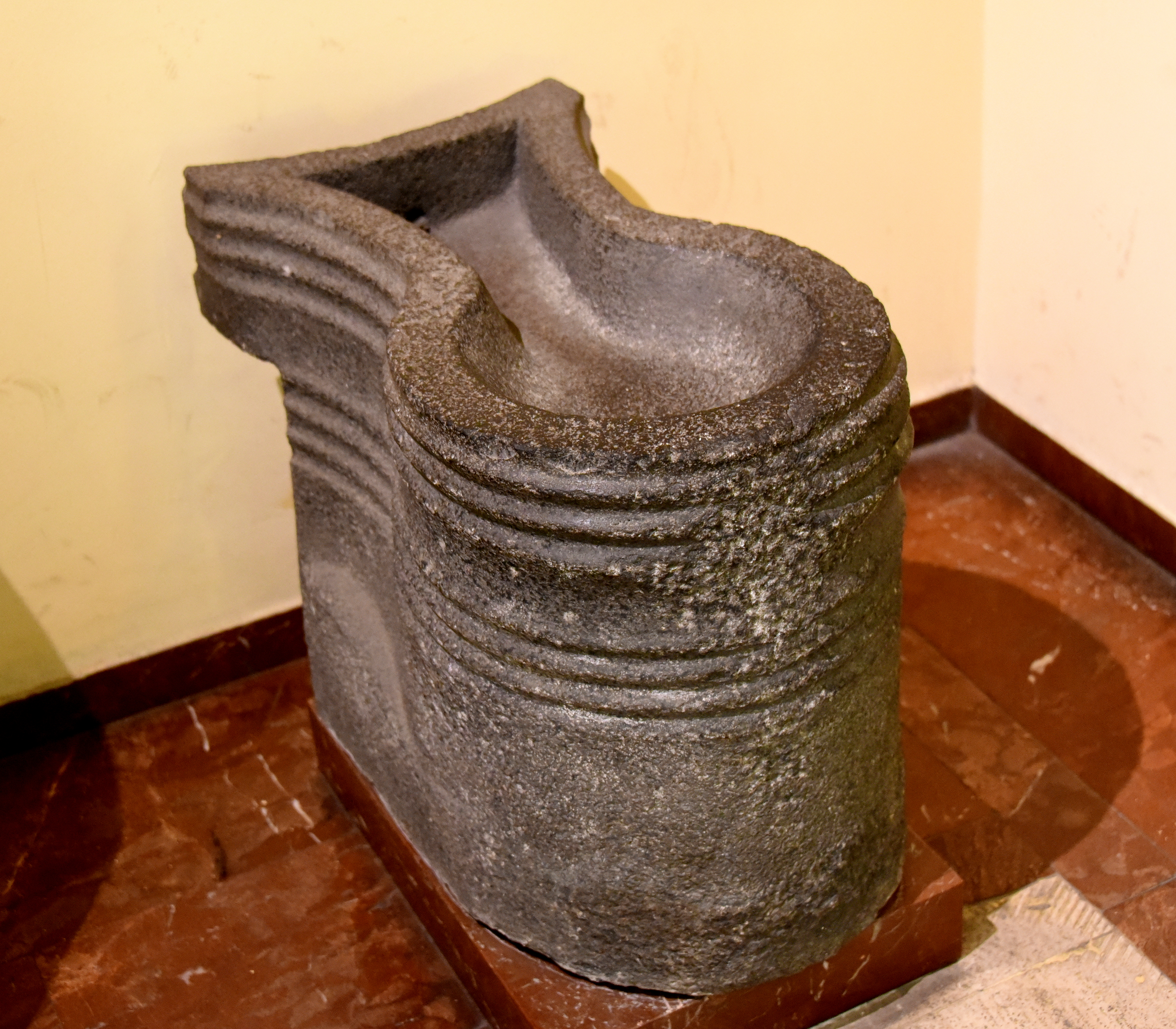
Offering table form the temple of Haldi. From Toprakkale, Van. 7th century BE. Museum of the Ancient Orient, Istanbul

The site has been excavated by archaeological teams from Germany, the United Kingdom, and other countries.

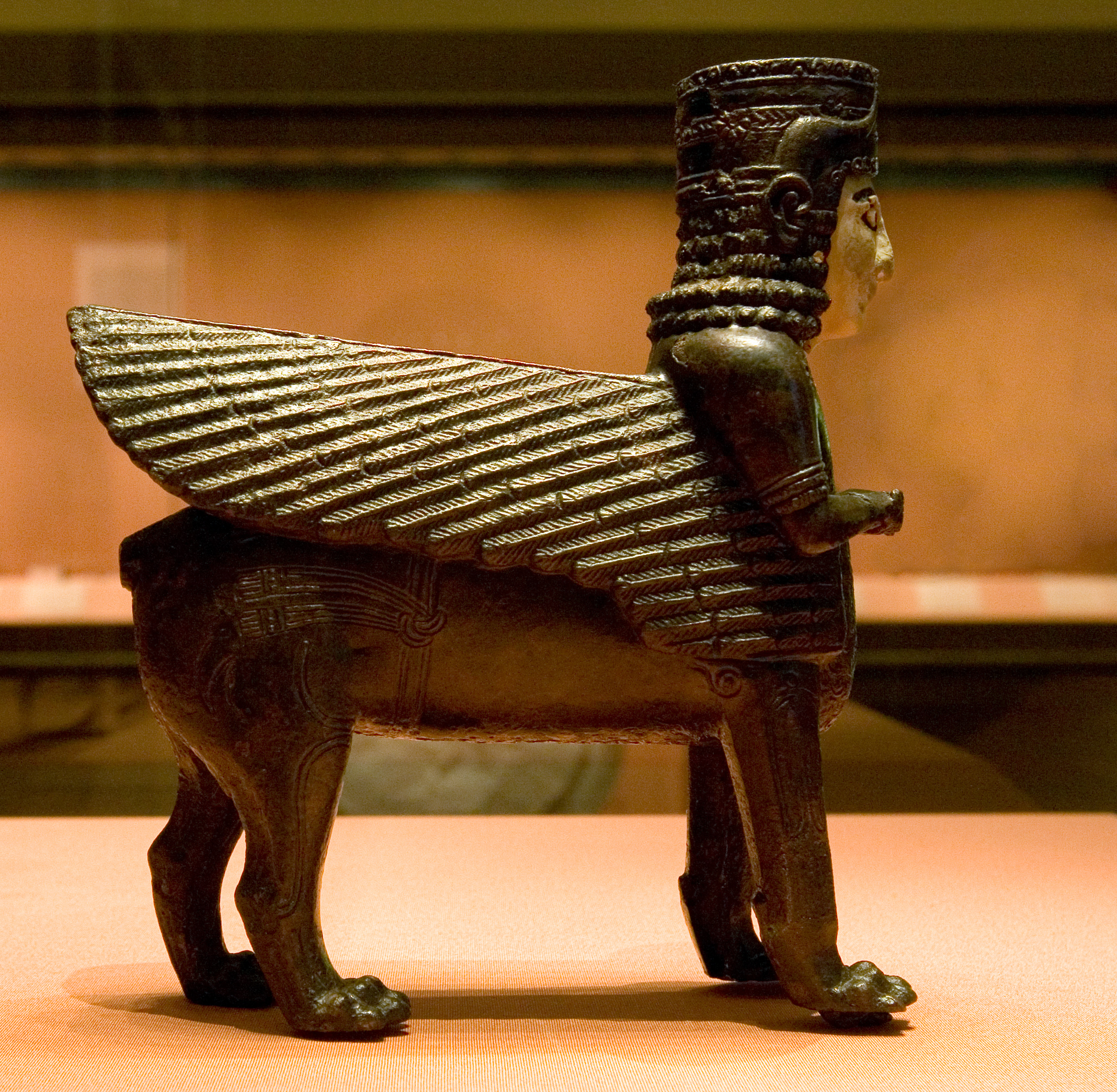
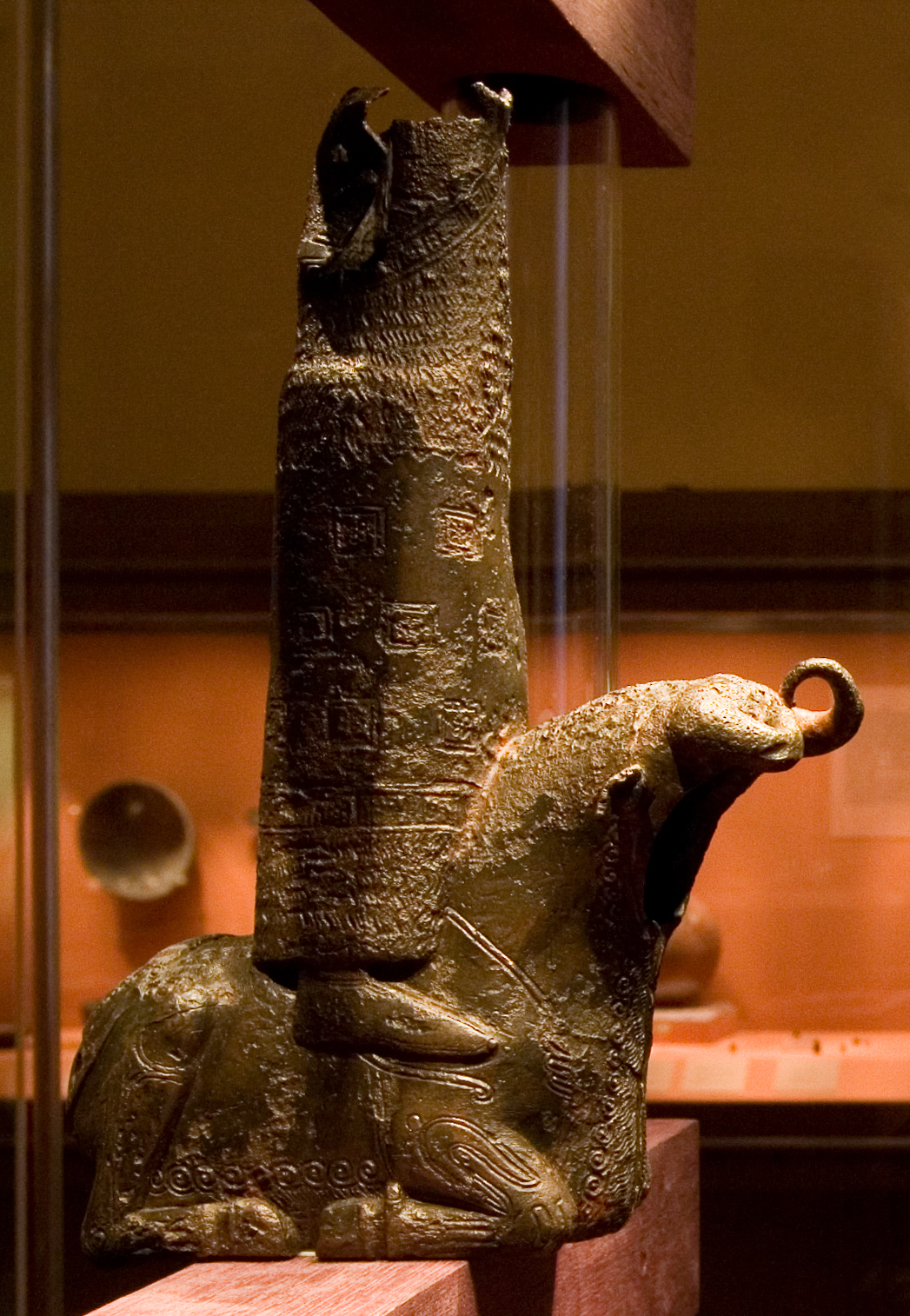
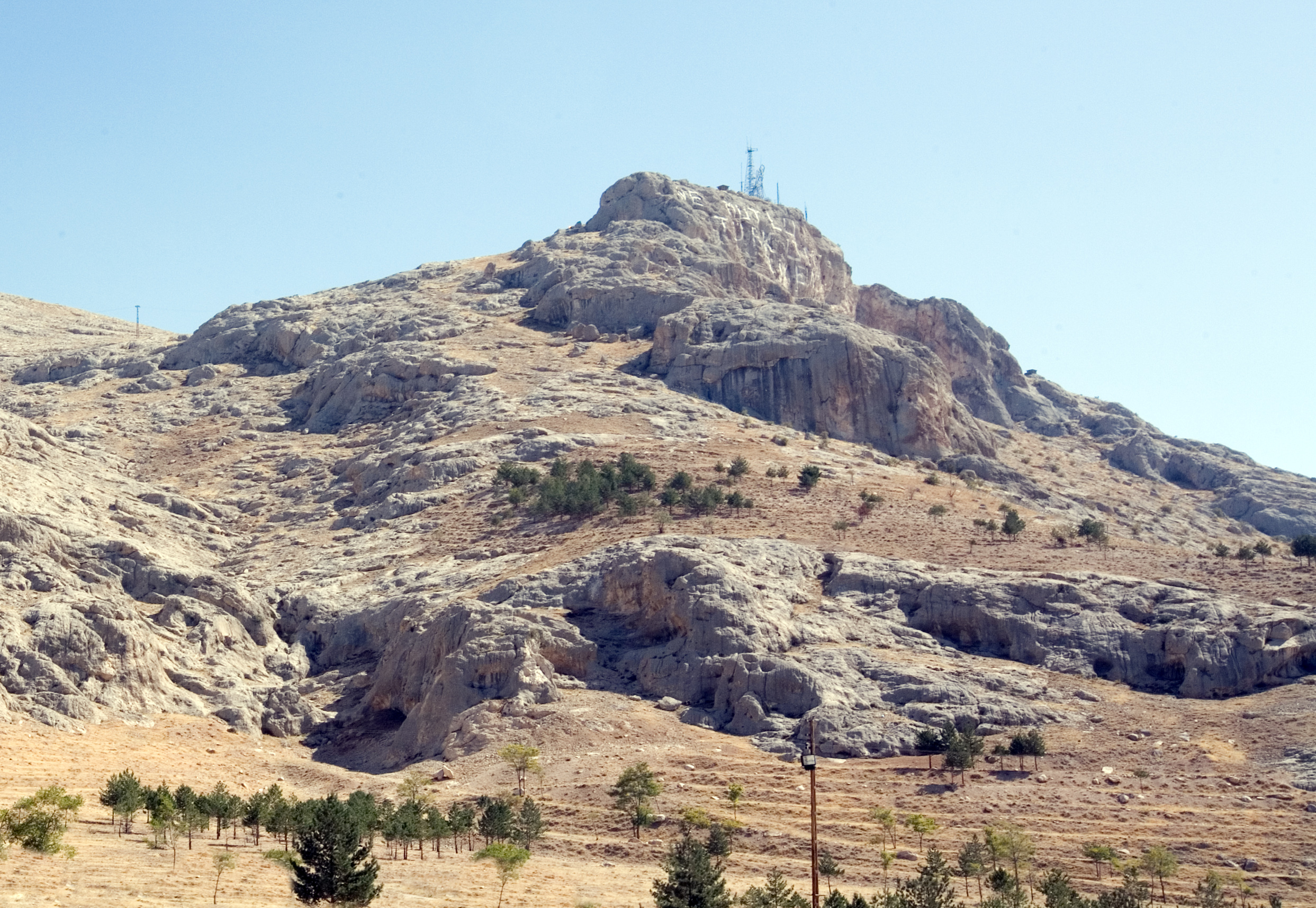
Urartian Art Samples from Rusahinili - Toprakkale in Turkey
Hermitage Museum, Sankt Petersburg		Rusahinili - Toprak-Kale, Turkey
Bronze sculpture of an Urartian god	Engraving of the Urartian God Teisheba	Rusahinili - Toprak-Kale, Turkey
Left: Sculpture of an Urartian deity found at Rusahinili - Toprak-Kale, Turkey, (Hermitage Museum, Sankt Petersburg). Center: Engraving of Urartian Storm and War God Teisheba, which was acquired in Rusahinili - Toprak-Kale, Turkey (Hermitage Museum, Sankt Petersburg). Right: Rusahinili - Toprak-Kale, Turkey, which is located at the east of Modern Van City and Lake Van, named Rusahinili in honor of the king Rusa I.
