= Sarduri II =

King of Urartu
- Reign: 764–735 BC
- Predecessor: Argishti I
- Successor: Rusa I
- Issue: Rusa I
- Father: Argishti I
- Mother: Bagena

Kingdom of Urartu under Sarduri II, 743 BC

Sarduri II (ruled: 764–735 BC) was a King of Urartu, succeeding his father Argishti I to the throne. The Urartian Kingdom was at its peak during his reign, campaigning successfully against several neighbouring powers, including Assyria.

== Reign ==
The succession of Sarduri II is not entirely clear. A king named Sarduri III is also attested, who may have been Rusa's father instead.

Sarduri II notably expanded Urartian territory by conquering the northern region of Colchis, as well as Melid and Kummuh in the Euphrates valley. Urartian sources refer to campaigns of Sarduri II against a place called "Babilu", which has sometimes been identified with Kassite regions that were formerly part of Babylonian Empire

In 743 BC, at a battle located somewhere in Kummuh, the Assyrians, under Tiglath-pileser III, defeated Sarduri and his anti-Assyrian coalition, forcing the Urartians back across the Euphrates.

Sarduri II was so confident in his power that he erected a massive wall at Tushpa (modern-day Van) with the following inscription:

the magnificent king, the mighty king, king of the universe, king of the land of Nairi, a king having none equal to him, a shepherd to be wondered at, fearing no battle, a king who humbled those who would not submit to his authority.

He may also have been succeeded by his son, Rusa I. There are various theories about this, but the matter is still disputed because of the lack of solid evidence. Kayalıdere castle is one of the important checkpoints built during the reign of the king of Urartu.

== Early campaigns ==
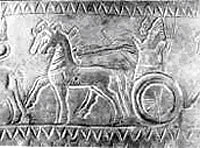
Detail from quiver ascribed to Sarduri II

The following are two passages from Sarduri II's inscriptions found at Van by Armenian archeologist Joseph Orbeli in 1912:

I went to the country of Mannai, I conquered the country, I burnt the towns, pillaged the countryside and exiled the population to Biaina. In the same year, my troops went to the country of Eriahini [or Eriach in Transcaucasia, north of Mount Ararat] conquering the country, setting fire to the towns, pillaging the countryside.

Claims of conquests such as this appear repeatedly:

The same year, for the third time, I went to Eriahini, fired the cities, pillaged the countryside and exiled the population to Biaina. I built forts at Eriahini and annexed the country. The god Khaldi I glorified. I made prisoners: 6436 men I took, 15,553 women. In all I led [away from their country] 21,989 people, some I have killed, others I have taken alive. 1613 horses, 115 camels, 16,529 head of cattle, 37,685 sheep [I have taken].

== See also ==
- List of kings of Urartu
