= Sarduri III =

King of Urartu
- Reign: 639–635 BC
- Predecessor: Rusa II
- Successor: Erimena
- Father: Rusa II
- Mother: Koton

Sarduri III was a king of Urartu between 639 BC and 635 BC.

Urartian King Argishti II left a record of fourteen years of his reign on the walls of chambers hewn in the Rock of Van, while Sarduri III's victories are inscribed on a monument erected on a spot called "the Treasury Gate" in the fortress of Van. The Urartians had in the east as neighbours the Minni or Manni, in the southerly portion of the Urmiah basin. Records of victories are also found inscribed further north, on the shores of Lake Sevan, at Gyumri and Erzurum.

== See also ==
- List of kings of Urartu
