= Rusa I =

King of Urartu

King of Urartu
- Reign: 735–714 BC
- Predecessor: Sarduri II
- Successor: Argishti II
- Issue: Melartua, Argishti II
- Father: Sarduri II
- Mother: Susaratu

Rusa I (ruled: 735–714 BC) was a King of Urartu. He succeeded his father, king Sarduri II. His name is sometimes transliterated as Rusas or Rusha. He was known to Assyrians as Ursa (which scholars have speculated is likely a more accurate pronunciation of the name) and possibly Urzana. His birth name may have been Uedipri.

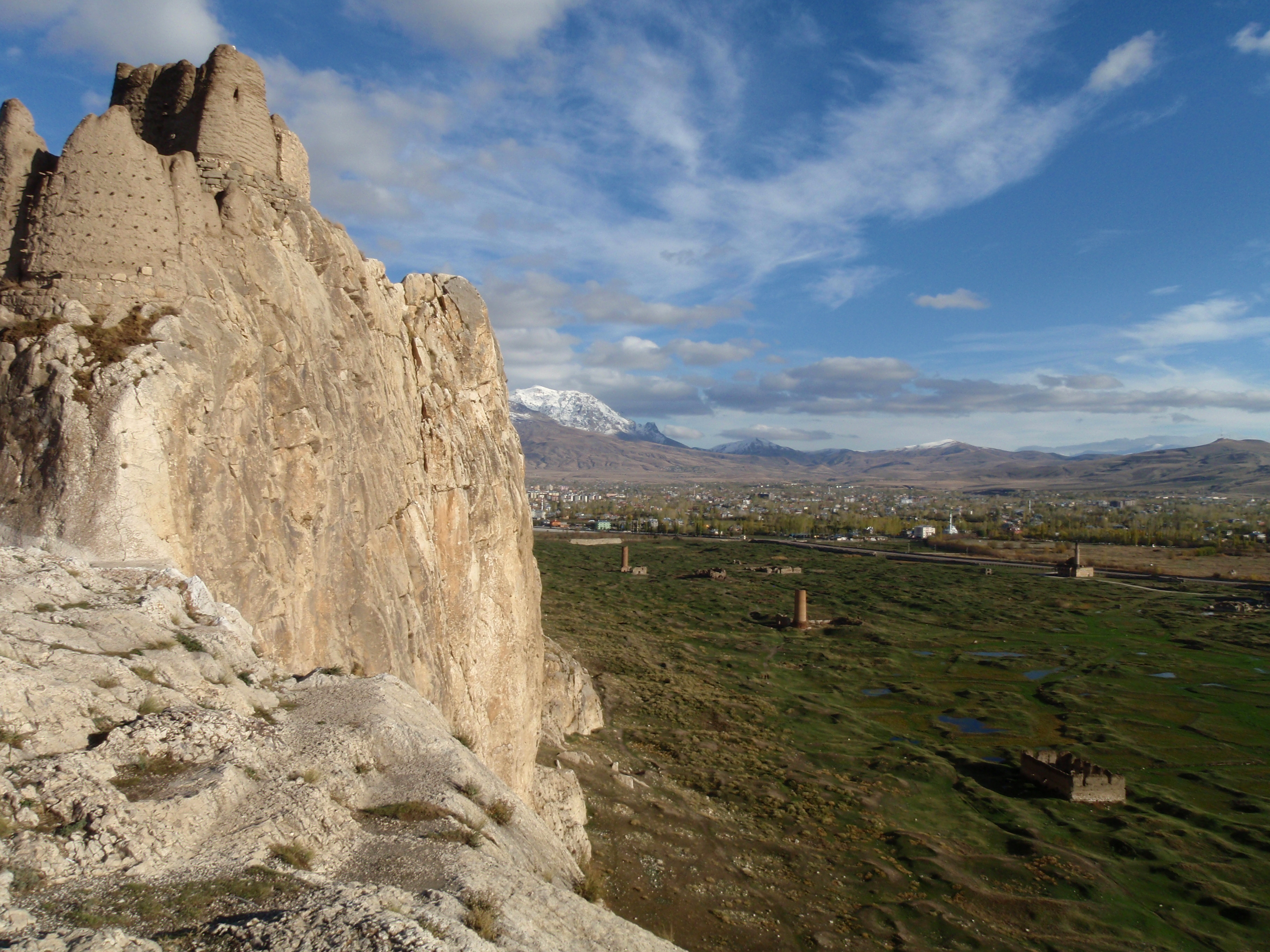
Citadel with the ruins of the city of Tushpa below - The fortress ruins of Rusas I

Rusa I built the fortress of Rusahinili (Rusa-hinili, city of Rusa), modern Toprakkale, located near the modern city of Van in eastern Turkey.

== Background ==
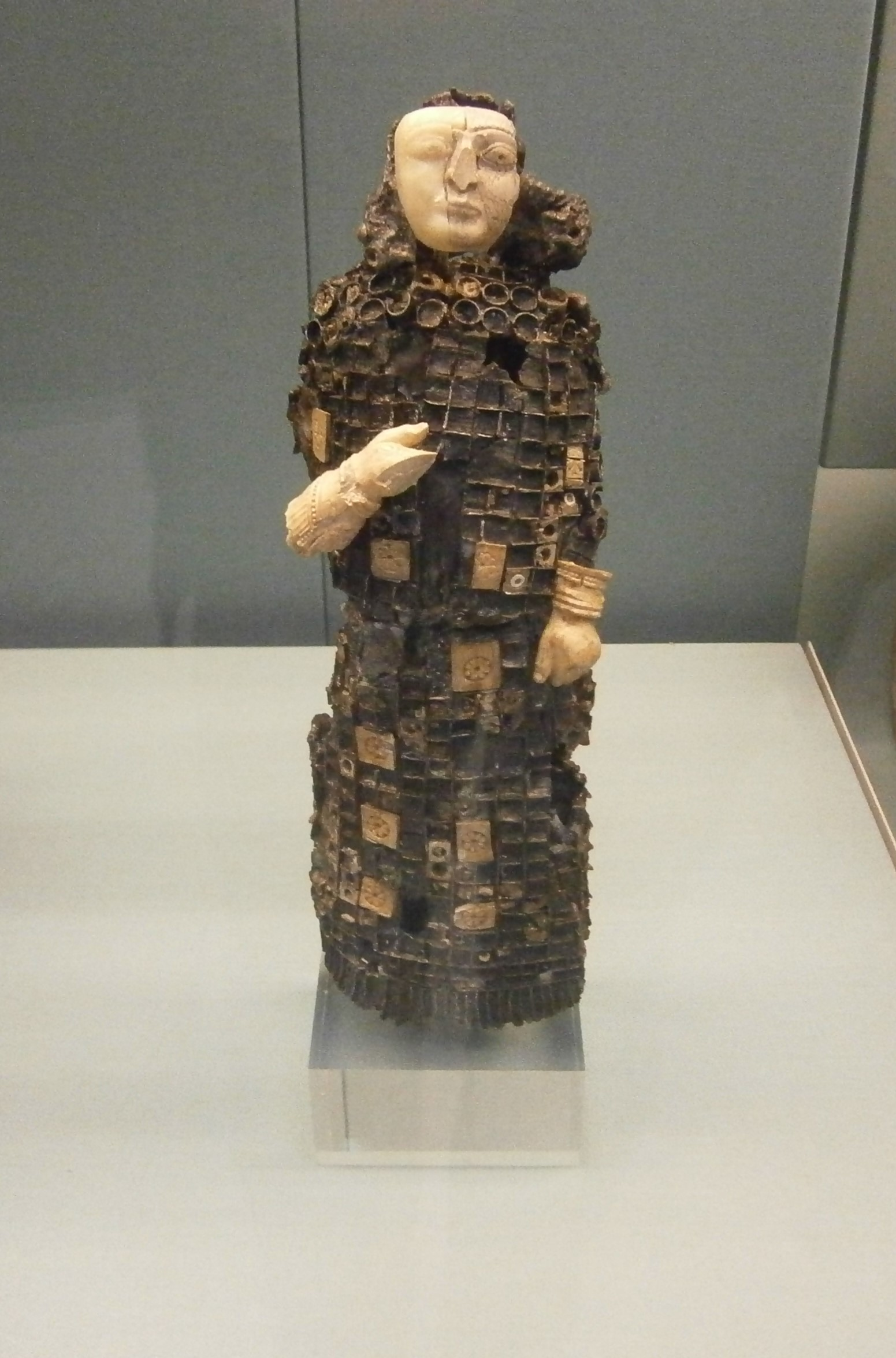
Lead figure with glass and ivory inlays, 8th-7th century BC. From Toprakkale, eastern Turkey, kingdom of Urartu. British Museum

Before Rusa's reign had begun, his father, King Sarduri II, had already expanded the kingdom to southeastern Anatolia, and had managed to retake various Anatolian territories from Assyria during a brief period of weakness in the Assyrian Empire.

The succession of Sarduri II is not entirely clear. Another king named Sarduri III is also attested, who may have been Rusa's father instead of Sarduri II.

When Rusa I inherited the throne, the Assyrians continued campaigns against him. The Assyrian king Tiglath-Pileser III (745–727 BC) was a formidable foe, and tried to expand his empire. The Assyrians repeatedly invaded Urartu, thus forcing Rusa I to spend the early years of his reign fighting the forces of Assyria.

According to an Assyrian source, Rusa managed to inflict a heavy defeat on the Assyrians, in which the Assyrian army was totally annihilated. The date of this battle is not entirely clear, but it was probably between 734 and 727 B.C.E.

The same source (SAA 19, 72), from a certain Aššūr-lē’i, also reports about Rusa's further military activities. There was a war between the Urartian king and the ruler of 'the land of Etini', in which the Urartians suffered some defeats.

The Mount Etini is located in eastern Kurdistan, and "the land of Aruni and Etini" is mentioned on Black Obelisk of Shalmaneser III.

These conflicts took a heavy toll on Urartu, particularly on its economy. After suffering reverses, Urartu lost the territory it had annexed under Sarduri II to Tiglath-Pileser III, and was forced to pay tribute to Assyria.

== Sargon II campaign ==
After Tiglath-Pileser III's death, Urartu became restive during the reign of Shalmanassar V, but not for long. Sargon II, who came to the throne in 722 BC, continued the Assyrian hostility against Urartu. He declared war on Urartu in 715 BC, thus beginning the Urartu-Assyria War. After defeating the Urartian ally, the Kingdom of Mannea, the Assyrians attacked Urartu. Rusa I was decisively defeated in this war and Urartu was once more subjugated, being forced to pay large annual tributes to Assyria. Rusa I also suffered defeats in battles against the encroaching Cimmerians in Gamir at this time. As a result of these losses, Rusa I fled into the mountains of Guriania, unbeknownst to many of his generals and governors.

Following these defeats, Rusa's son, Melartua, was either crowned king in his father's stead or led a rebellion against his father. Rusa I returned to Tushpa and Melartua was subsequently killed by officials loyal to his father.

In 714 BCE, Rusa I committed suicide as a result of the defeats by the Assyrians and Cimmerians.

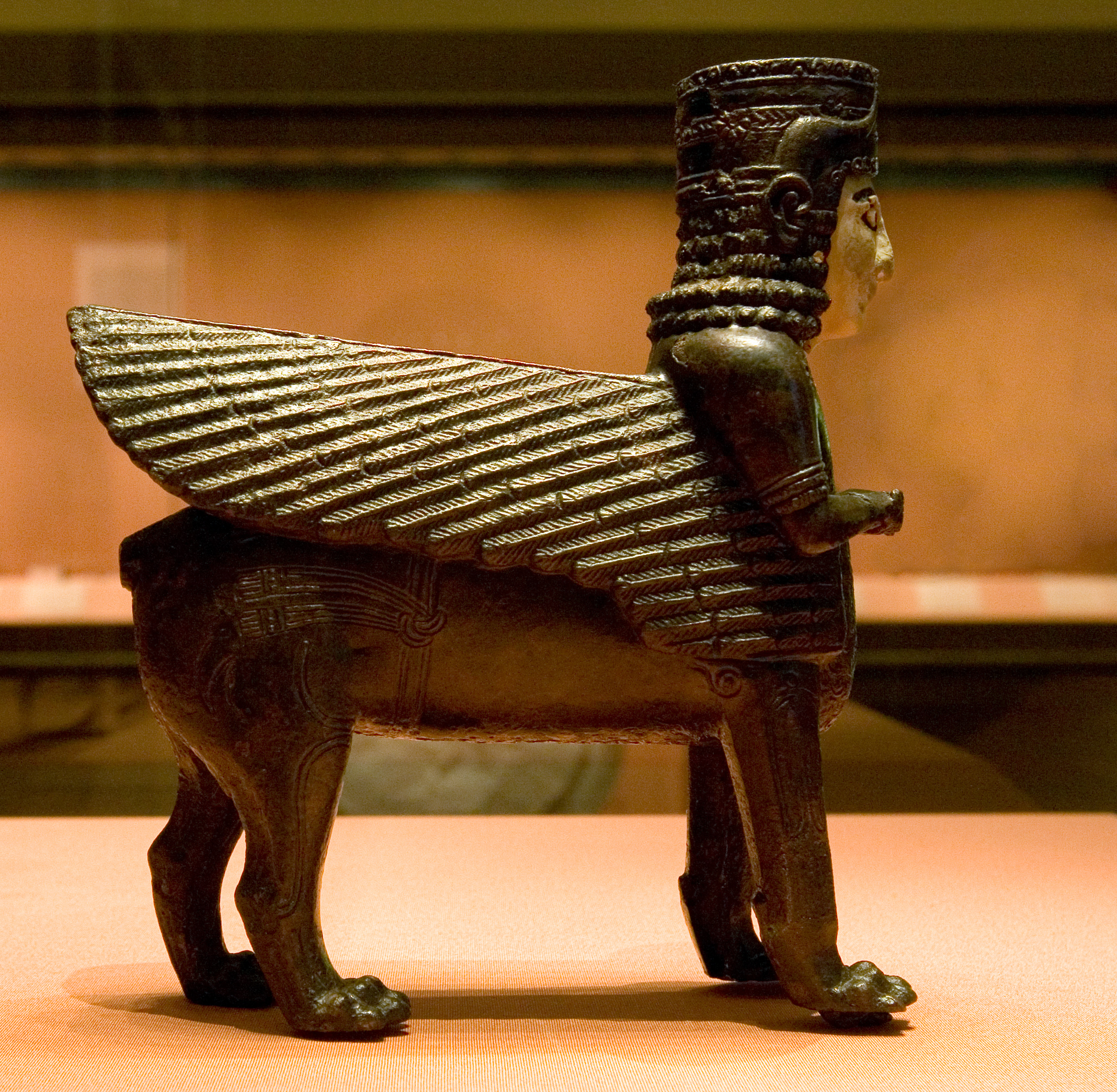
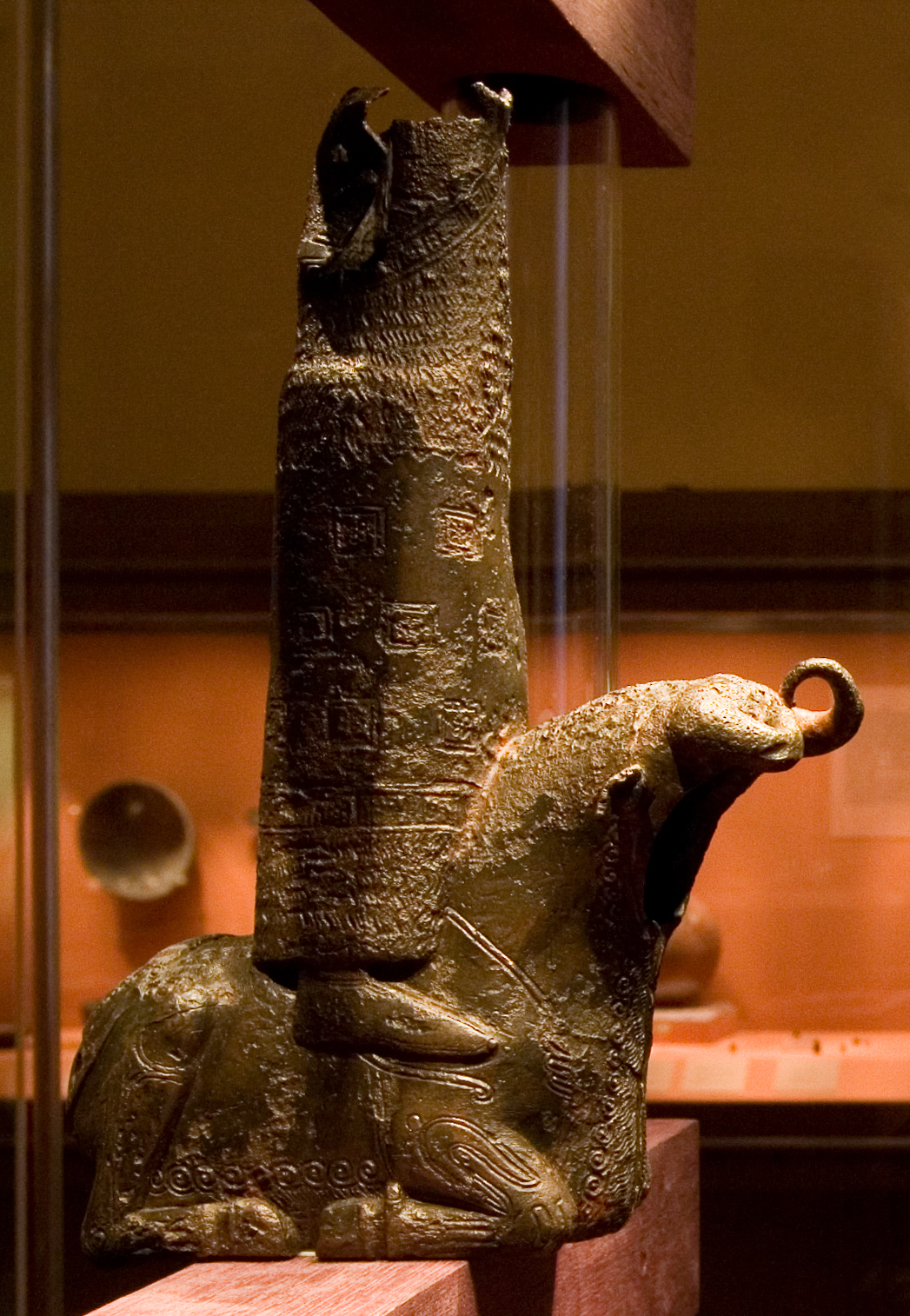
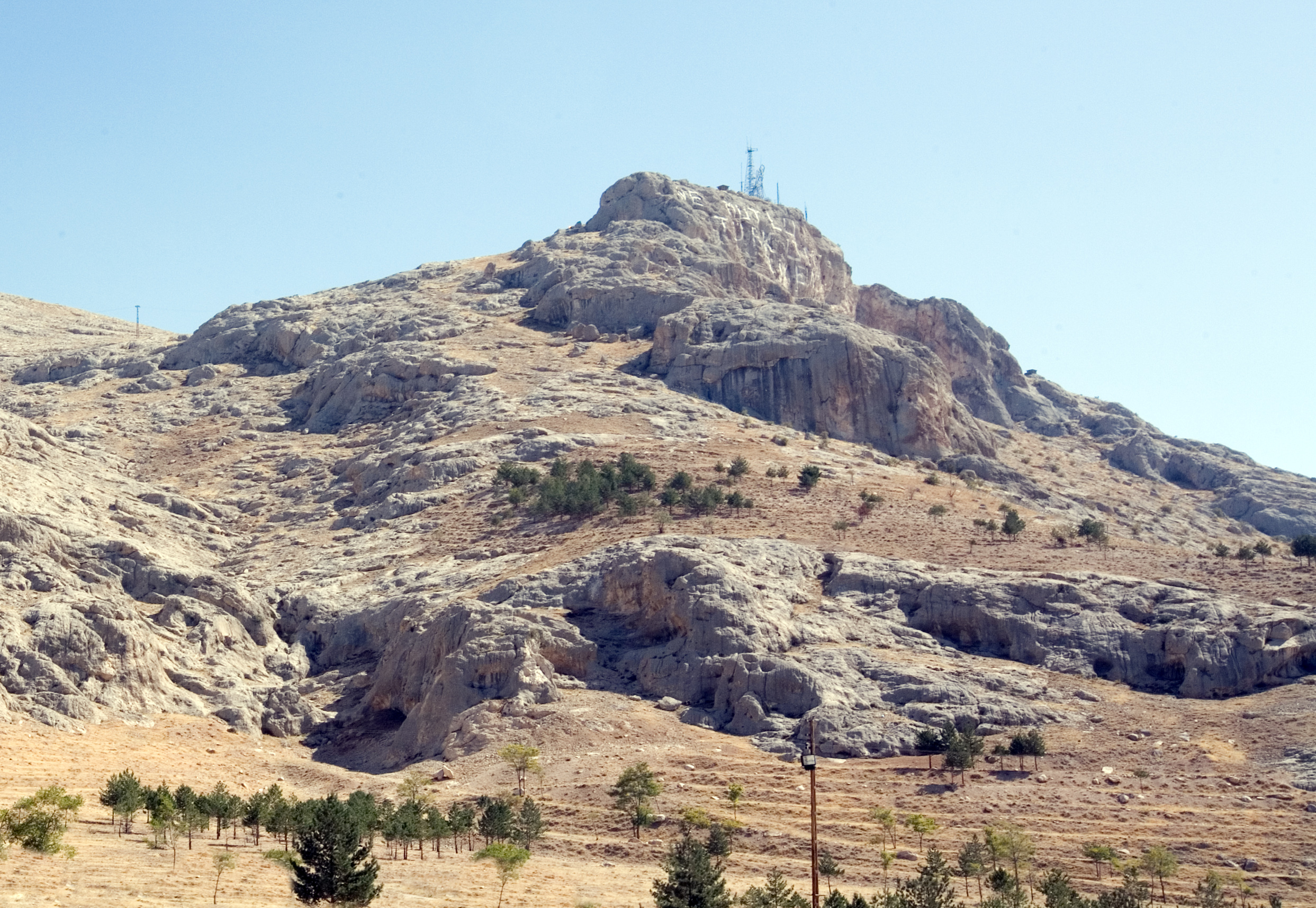
Urartian Art Samples from Rusahinili - Toprakkale in Turkey
Hermitage Museum, Sankt Petersburg		Rusahinili - Toprak-Kale, Turkey
Bronze Sculpture of an Urartu God	Engraving of Urartu God Teisheba	Rusahinili - Toprak-Kale, Turkey
Left: Sculpture of an Urartian God found at Rusahinili - Toprak-Kale, Turkey, (Hermitage Museum, Sankt Petersburg). Center: Engraving of Urartian Storm and War God Teisheba, which was acquired in Rusahinili - Toprak-Kale, Turkey (Hermitage Museum, Sankt Petersburg). Right: Rusahinili - Toprak-Kale, Turkey, which is located at the east of Modern Van City and Lake Van, named Rusahinili in honor of the king Rusa I.

== See also ==
- List of kings of Urartu
