= Rusa II =

King of Urartu

King of Urartu
- Reign: 680–639 BC
- Predecessor: Argishti II
- Successor: Sarduri III
- Queen consort: Qaquli
- Father: Argishti II
- Mother: Hasis

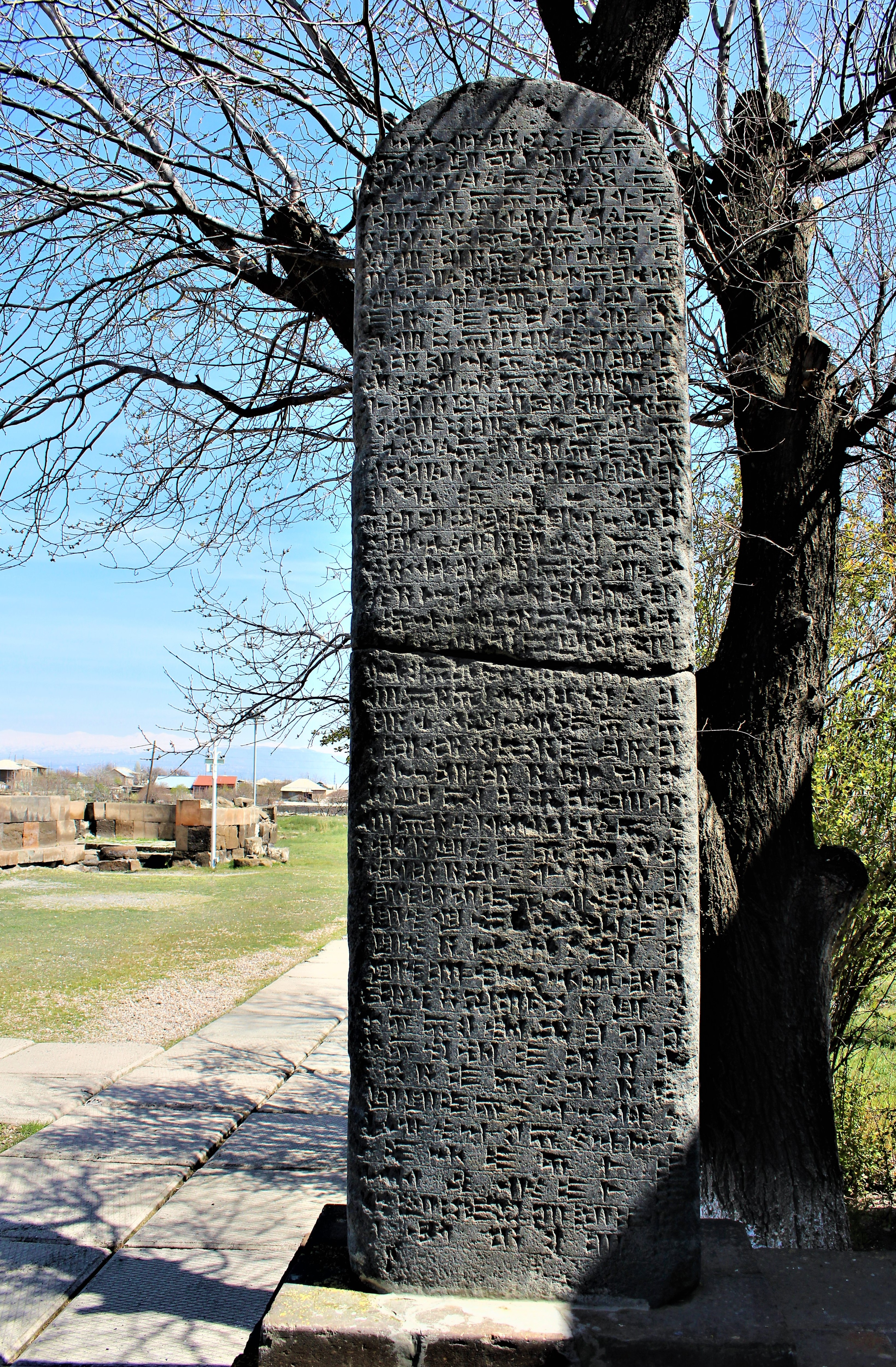
A cuneiform inscription of the Urartian king Rusa II commemorating the building of a canal.

Rusa II was king of Urartu between around 680 BC and 639 BC. It was during his reign that the massive fortress complex, Karmir-Blur, was constructed. He also built the fortress of Ayanis, which was known at the time by the name Rusahinili Eidurukai ("The City of Rusa in front of Mount Eiduru").

Rusa II was known to Esarhaddon, king of Assyria, as Yaya or Iaya.

A cuneiform inscription has been found commemorating the king building a canal to channel water to the city of Quarlini from the Ildaruni (Hrazdan River).

== See also ==
- List of kings of Urartu
