= Goller =

Goller or Göller may refer to:

== People ==
- Andreas Goller (born 1976), Italian sports manager and entrepreneur
- Benjamin Goller (born 1999), German footballer
- Christian Goller (born 1943), German painter and art restorer currently under investigation regarding paintings attributed to Lucas Cranach the Elder
- Gottlieb Göller (1935–2004), German football player and manager
- Josef Goller (1868–1947), German designer and stained-glass artist
- Karl Heinz Göller (1924–2009), German medievalist
- Manuela Goller (born 1971), German former footballer
- Sara Goller (born 1983), German beach volleyball player
- Thomas Goller (born 1977), German hurdler

== Places ==
- Göller, Sungurlu, Çorum Province, Turkey
- Göller, Çayırlı, Erzincan Province, Turkey
- Göller, Hınıs, Erzurum Province, Turkey
- Göller, Üzümlü, Erzincan Province, Turkey

== Other uses ==
- Brauerei Göller, a German craft brewery
