= Çardaklı =

Çardaklı can refer to:

- Çardaklı, Atkaracalar
- Çardaklı, Göle
- Çardaklı, Hani
- Çardaklı, Hasankeyf
- Çardaklı, Üzümlü
