= Urartian language =

Language of the ancient Urartu, now the Eastern Anatolia region

Urartian
- Urartean, Vannic
- Native to: Urartu
- Region: Armenian highlands
- Ethnicity: Urartians
- Era: attested 9th–6th century BCE
- Language family: Hurro-Urartian: Urartian
- Writing system: Neo-Assyrian cuneiform Anatolian hieroglyphs

Language codes
- ISO 639-3: xur
- Glottolog: urar1245
- Urartu in 743 BC

Urartian or Vannic is an extinct Hurro-Urartian language which was spoken by the inhabitants of the ancient kingdom of Urartu (Biaini or Biainili in Urartian), which was centered on the region around Lake Van and had its capital, Tushpa, near the site of the modern town of Van in the Armenian highlands, now in the Eastern Anatolia region of Turkey. Its past prevalence is unknown. While some believe it was probably dominant around Lake Van and in the areas along the upper Zab valley, others believe it was spoken by a relatively small population who comprised a ruling class.

First attested in the 9th century BCE, Urartian ceased to be written after the fall of the Urartian state in 585 BCE and presumably became extinct due to the fall of Urartu. It must have had long contact with, and been gradually totally replaced by, an early form of Armenian.

== Classification ==
Urartian is an ergative, agglutinative language, which belongs to the Hurro-Urartian family, whose only other known member is Hurrian, a language spoken in Eastern Anatolia, Northern Levant, Upper Mesopotamia and Northwestern Ancient Iran. It survives in many cuneiform inscriptions found in the territory of the Kingdom of Urartu. There have been claims of a separate autochthonous script of "Urartian hieroglyphs" but they remain unsubstantiated.

Urartian is closely related to Hurrian, a somewhat better documented language attested for an earlier, non-overlapping period, approximately from 2000 BCE to 1200 BCE, written by native speakers until about 1350 BCE before the Hurrian empire was destroyed by the Middle Assyrian Empire. The two related languages must have developed quite independently from approximately 2000 BCE onwards. Although Urartian is not a direct continuation of any of the attested dialects of Hurrian, many of its features are best explained as innovative developments with respect to Hurrian as it is known from the preceding millennium. The closeness holds especially true of the so-called Old Hurrian dialect, known above all from Hurro-Hittite bilingual texts.

The external connections of the Hurro-Urartian languages are disputed. There exist various proposals for a genetic relationship to other language families, e.g. Northeast Caucasian languages, Indo-European languages, or Kartvelian languages, but none of these are generally accepted, and Hurro-Urartian is considered to be an independent language family.

Indo-European, namely Armenian and Anatolian, as well as Iranian and possibly Paleo-Balkan, etymologies have been proposed for many Urartian personal and topographic names, such as the names of kings Arame and Argishti, regions such as Diauehi and Uelikulqi, cities such as Arzashkun, geographical features like the Arșania River, as well as some Urartian vocabulary and grammar, however this is likely to be due to lexical borrowing by later arriving Indo-European speakers. Surviving texts of the language are written in a variant of the Assyrian Cuneiform script called Neo-Assyrian. Comparison:

Urartian	Hurrian	Meaning
esi	eše	Location
šuri	šauri	Weapon
mane	mane	3. Sg. Pers.
-ḫi	-ḫi	Affiliation affix
-še	-š	Ergative
-di	-tta	1. Sg. Abs.
ag-	ag-	to lead
ar-	ar-	to give
man-	mann-	to be
nun-	un-	to come
-di	-da	Directive
-u-	-o-	Transitivity marking
qiura	eše	Earth
lutu	ašte	Transitivity marking

== Decipherment ==
The German scholar Friedrich Eduard Schulz, who discovered the Urartian inscriptions of the Lake Van region in 1826, made copies of several cuneiform inscriptions at Tushpa, but made no attempt at decipherment. Schulz's drawings, published posthumously in 1840 in the Journal Asiatique, were crucial in forwarding the decipherment of Mesopotamian cuneiform by Edward Hincks.

After the decipherment of Assyrian cuneiform in the 1850s, Schulz's drawings became the basis of the decipherment of the Urartian language. It soon became clear that it was unrelated to any known language, and attempts at decipherment based on known languages of the region failed. The script was deciphered in 1882 by A. H. Sayce. The oldest of these inscriptions is from the time of Sarduri I of Urartu. Decipherment only made progress after World War I, with the discovery of Urartian-Assyrian bilingual inscriptions at Kelišin and Topzawä. In 1963, a grammar of Urartian was published by G. A. Melikishvili in Russian, appearing in German translation in 1971. In the 1970s, the genetic relation with Hurrian was established by I. M. Diakonoff.

In 1962, after completing his military service, Kurdish man Mehmet Kuşman, started to work as a guard in the Çavuştepe castle, built by the Urartians between 764 and 735 BC. He became fascinated with the mysterious language when an excavation team found an inscription at the site, but did not know how to decipher it. A quote reads: "I used to think that professors know everything in this world, but it wasn't like that." Despite being a primary school graduate, he started to learn the Urartian script from the archeologists and linguists who came to the region for excavation work and the books they gave, later traveling to study Urartian-Assyrian bilingual inscriptions. He reached a point where he needed an alphabet, traveling to Iran, Syria, and Armenia illegally without a passport for field study. In Armenia he got a tip of a village near the Georgia border where a man lived who could help him. After 3 years he learnt the Urartian script, becoming one of a handful of people who could read and write it fluently. Despite various lucrative offers, Kuşman did not pursue an academic career abroad, instead teaching on location of his old job.

== Corpus ==
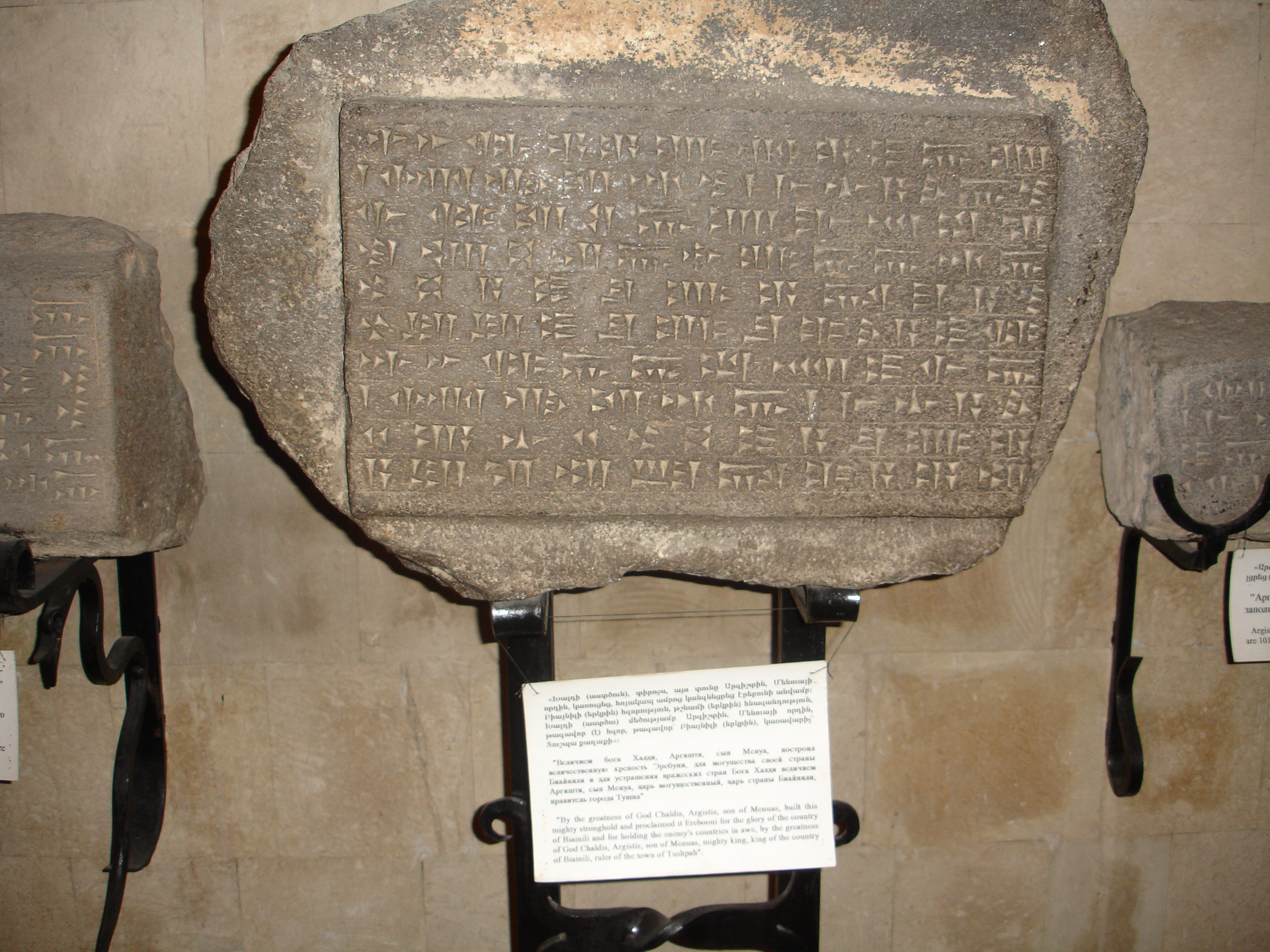
A Urartian cuneiform stone inscription on display at the Erebuni Museum in Yerevan. The inscription reads: For the God Khaldi, the lord, Argishti, son of Menua, built this temple and this mighty fortress. I proclaimed it Irbuni (Erebuni) for the glory of the countries of Biai (=Urartu) and for holding the Lului (=enemy) countries in awe. By the greatness of God Khaldi, this is Argishti, son of Menua, the mighty king, the king of the countries of Biai, ruler of the city of Tushpa

The oldest recorded texts originate from the reign of Sarduri I, from the late 9th century BCE. Texts were produced until the fall of the realm of Urartu, approximately 200 years later.

Approximately two hundred inscriptions written in the Urartian language, which adopted and modified the cuneiform script, have been discovered to date.

== Writing ==
=== Cuneiform ===
Urartian cuneiform is a standardized simplification of Neo-Assyrian cuneiform. Unlike in Assyrian, each sign only expresses a single syllabic value (with 18 exceptions). The syllabic characters adopted, only represented the 4 vowels a, e, i, and u (i.e. either the standalone vowel; or ba, be, bi, bu, etc.; or ar, er, ir, ur, etc.). In order to express the vowel of a syllable with greater clearness, the character denoting it was commonly written after the one which contained the consonant; The sound ba, for example, being written "ba-a". In this way, the people of Van came very near to transforming the syllabary into a true alphabet. Indeed, in one instance at least, this transformation was actually made. The final -s suffix denoting the nominative case, is represented by the character 𒊺 se, which must be read here simply /s/.

Along with this syllabary a considerable number of ideographs and determinative prefixes were also borrowed. The native Urartian grammatical suffixes of the ideographs were generally denoted by adding to them other syllabic characters to express the phonetic sounds of the suffixes; these correspond to the phonetic complements of Assyrian. At times the word itself or the latter portion of it was written by the side of the ideograph which stood for it, serving as a hint on how the ideogram is to be read.

The character 𒄀 gi has the special function of expressing a hiatus, e.g. u-gi-iš-ti for Uīšdi. A variant script with non-overlapping wedges was in use for rock inscriptions.

Urartian cuneiform syllabary (Sayce's decipherment)
	-a		-e		-i		-u		a-		e-		i-		u-		
–	A	𒀪	E	𒂊	I	𒄿	U	𒌋	A	𒀀	E	𒂊	I	𒄿	U	𒌋	–
b-	BA	𒁀	[BI]	𒁉	BI	𒁉	BU	𒁍	AB	𒀊	—	—	IB	𒅁	—	—	-b
p-	PA	𒉺	[PI]	𒉿	PI	𒉿	PU	𒁍	AP	𒀊	—	—	IP	𒅁	—	—	-p
t-	TA	𒋫	TE	𒋼	TI	𒋾	TU	𒌓	AT	𒀜	ET	𒀉	—	—	—	—	-t
d-	DA	𒁕/𒋫	[DI]	𒁲	DI	𒁲	DU	𒁺	AD	𒀜	ED	𒀉	—	—	—	—	-d
ṭ- (dh-)	ṬA	𒉈	[ṬI]	𒋼	ṬI	𒋼	ṬU	𒂅	—	—	—	—	—	—	—	—	-ṭ
k-	KA	𒅗	[KI]	𒆠	KI	𒆠	KU	𒆪	—	—	—	—	—	—	—	—	-k
g-	GA	𒂵	[GI]	𒄀	GI	𒄀	GU	𒄖	—	—	—	—	—	—	—	—	-g
q- (ḳ-)	QA	𒋡	[QI]	𒆥	QI	𒆥	QU	𒄣	—	—	—	—	—	—	—	—	-q
h-/w-	HA/ʾA	𒄴	—	—	—	—	HU/Ú	𒌑	—	—	—	—	—	—	—	—	-h
ḫ- (kh-)	ḪA	𒄩	ḪE	𒃶	ḪI	𒄭	—	—	—	—	—	—	—	—	—	—	-ḫ
l-	LA	𒆷	[LI]	𒇷	LI	𒇷	LU	𒇻	AL	𒀠	EL	𒂖	IL	𒂖	UL	𒌌	-l
m-	MA	𒈠	ME	𒈨	MI	𒈨	MU	𒈬	AM	𒄠	[EM]	𒅎	IM	𒅎	UM	𒌝	-m
n-	NA	𒈾	[NI]	𒉌	NI	𒉌	NU	𒉡	AN	𒀭	—	—	—	—	UN	𒌦	-n
r-	RA	𒊏	[RI]	𒊑	RI	𒊑	RU	𒊒	AR	𒅈	—	—	IR	𒅕	UR	𒌨	-r
s-	SA	𒊹	ŠE	𒊺	SI	𒋛	SU	𒋙	AS	𒀾	—	—	IS	𒅖	US	𒊻	-s
š-	ŠA	𒊭	ŠE	𒊺	ŠI	𒅆	ŠU	𒎌	—	—	—	—	—	—	—	—	-š
z-	ZA	𒍝	[ZI]	𒍣	ZI	𒍣	ZU	𒍪	—	—	—	—	—	—	—	—	-z
ṣ- (z2-)(ts-)	ṢA	𒍝	—	—	ṢI	𒍢	ṢU	𒍮	—	—	—	—	—	—	—	—	-ts
y-	YA	𒅀	—	—	—	—	—	—	—	—	—	—	—	—	—	—	-y

CVC syllabic signs, Determinateve signs, and ideograms
CVC			Definition	Logogram		Urartian reading	Definition	Logogram		Urartian reading
BAD		𒁁	King	MAN	𒎙	šarri	Victim	UDU	𒇻	susi=y=šə
BAL		𒁄	King	LUGAL	𒈗	ḫulay=šə	Sheep	UDU	𒇻	susi=y=šə
BAR		𒁇	Lord	EN	𒂗	ewri=šə	Ox	GUD	𒄞	paḫini=šə
BUR		𒁓	Governor	EN.EN-še	𒂗𒂗𒊺	ewrielə=šə	Wild Ox	GUD.ÁB	𒄞𒀖	paḫinil=aw
DUR		𒄙	Strong	DAN-NU	𒆗𒉡	taray=šə	Wild Ox	MAŠ.ḪI.TUR	𒈦𒄭𒌉	ma=šə
GAR/QAR		𒃼	Man	LÚ	𒇽	ḫa=šə	Camel	ANŠE.A.AB.BA	𒀲𒀀𒀊𒁀	duni=šə
GIŠ		𒄑	Person	GAL-UN	𒃲𒌦	ibira=y=šə	Horse	ANŠE.KUR.RA	𒀲𒆳𒊏	navusi=šə
GUR		𒄥	Son	A	𒀀	a	Alive	TI	𒋾	šekiri=šə
ḪAL		𒄬	Boy/Child	DUMU	𒌉	ḫan-ə	Many	ḪI.A	𒄭𒀀	terub-ə
ḪAR		𒄯	People	KU-AŠ	𒆯𒀸	taršwa	Total	PAP	𒉽	pap=nə
KAB		𒆏	Soldier	ERÍN	𒂟	aši=šə	Hostile	KÚR	𒉽	kur=nə
KAR		𒋼𒀀	Slave	ARAD	𒀴	buramə	To Burn	ŠÚ.ÁŠ	𒋙𒀾	abidad=u=nə
KID		𒆤	Language/Tribe	EME	𒅴	barusi=nə	To Give	SUM	𒋧	ar=u=nə
KID		𒆤	Language/Tribe	EME	𒅴	barusi=nə	To Give	SUM	𒋧	ar=u=nə
KUR		𒆳	Country	KUR	𒆳	ebani=šə	To Make	KAK	𒆕	tan=u=nə
LIB		𒊮	City	URU	𒌷	inani=šə	Twice	MAŠ	𒈦	turu=nə
NIN		𒊩𒌆	House	É	𒂍	asi=šə	Sixty	UŠ	𒍑	šuši=ə
RAB		𒃲	House	É.GAL	𒂍𒃲	asida/duluri=šə	Sixty	LIM-LIM/4-4	𒑌𒑌	diduni
ŠAR		𒊬	Firm House	É.ZI	𒂍𒍣	asi=y zərni	Sixty	LIM-LIM/4-4	𒑌𒑌	diduni
TAP		𒋰	Stone	NA	𒎎	kabbiš=ə	Month	ITU	𒌗	atsušə
TAR		𒋻	Tablet	DUB	𒁾	pilə	Year	MU	𒈬	manə
ṬUR		𒌉	Tablet	DUB-te	𒁾𒋼	pili=šə	God	DINGIR	𒀭	aštə
Determinative Prefix			Gold	KÙ.G	𒆬𒄀	tuay=šə	Sun-god	UTU	𒀭𒌓	ardini=šə
Divinity	^{d/D}-	𒀭	Silver	KÙ.BABBAR	𒆬𒌓	urupu=nə	Storm-god	IM	𒀭𒅎	tešeba=šə
Individual	^{DIŠ}-	𒁹	Bronze/Copper	URUDU	𒍏	zabal-ə	Heaven	AN-e	𒀭𒂊	gen-ə
Woman	^{SAL}-	𒊩	a unit of "Minah"	MA.NA	𒈠𒈾	mana=y	Heaven	SÎN	𒀭𒌍	šelardi=šə
Nation/People	^{LÚ}-	𒇽	Flesh/Meat	UZU	𒍜	ḫu=šə	Assyria	^{KUR}aš-šur	𒆳𒀸𒋩	aššur=ə
Animal	^{ANŠE}-	𒀲	Food/Fodder/Feed	Ú	𒌑	gili=šə/gili=u=nə	River	ÍD	𒀀𒇉	mu-na
Wood	^{GIŠ}-	𒄑	Drink (n.)/to Irrigate	NAG	𒅘	qul=ə=šə/qul=u=nə	To Have	TUKU	𒌇	haš=u=nə
Country/Territory	^{KUR}-	𒆳	Sacrifice	ŠUM	𒋳	ḫali=šə	Shepherd	SIPAD	𒉺𒇻	nari=šə
Plural Suffix	-^{MEŠ} (-=lə)	𒈨𒌍	Sacrifice	ŠUM	𒋳	ḫali=šə	Shepherd	SIPAD	𒉺𒇻	nari=šə

=== Hieroglyphs ===
Urartian was also rarely written in the "Anatolian hieroglyphs" used for the Luwian language. Evidence for this is restricted to Altıntepe.

There are suggestions that besides the Luwian hieroglyphic inscriptions, Urartu also had a native hieroglyphic script. The inscription corpus is too sparse to substantiate the hypothesis. It remains unclear whether the symbols in question form a coherent writing system, or represent just a multiplicity of uncoordinated expressions of proto-writing or ad-hoc drawings. What can be identified with a certain confidence are two symbols or "hieroglyphs" found on vessels, representing certain units of measurement: for aqarqi and for ṭerusi. This is known because some vessels were labelled both in cuneiform and with these symbols.

== Phonology ==
Hachikian (2010) gives the following consonants for Urartian inferred both from Urartian writing as well as loans into neighboring languages, mainly Armenian:

		Labial	Dental / Alveolar	Dorsal (Velar and palatal)
Nasals		m ⟨m⟩	n ⟨n⟩	
Stops	voiceless	pʰ ⟨p⟩	tʰ ⟨t⟩	kʰ ⟨k⟩
Stops	voiced	b ⟨b⟩	d ⟨d⟩	ɡ ⟨g⟩
Stops	"emphatic" (ejective)	pʼ ⟨p⟩	tʼ ⟨ṭ⟩	kʼ ⟨q⟩
Affricates	voiceless		t͡sʰ ⟨s⟩	
Affricates	voiced		d͡z ⟨z⟩	
Affricates	"emphatic" (ejective)		t͡sʼ ⟨ṣ⟩	
Fricatives	voiceless	(f) ⟨p⟩?	s ⟨š⟩	x ⟨ḫ⟩
Fricatives	voiced	v ‹b, u, ú›	(z)	ɣ ⟨ḫ⟩
Approximants	median	w ‹u, ú›	r~ɾ ⟨r⟩	j ⟨g, i⟩
Approximants	lateral		l~ɫ ⟨l⟩	

The three-way laryngeal contrast for stops and affricates was faithfully represented in Urartian writing, except for the "emphatic' /pʼ/ which the Semitic-based cuneiform writing system did not have a distinct symbol for. Their values are confirmed by loans in Armenian. Urartian voiceless stops and affricates were loaned as voiceless aspirates in Armenian, while Urartian "emphatic" stops are found as unaspirated voiceless stops in Armenian. E.g., Urartian ul-ṭu 'camel' ↦ Armenian ուղտ ułt, Urartian ṣu-(ú-)pa- 'Sophene (toponym)' ↦ Armenian Ծոփ- Copʰ-. Contrasting the last example with Urartian ṭu-uš-pa- ‘Tushpa (toponym)’ ↦ Armenian Տոսպ Tosp, Hachikian (2010) reconstructs an "emphasis" distinction in the bilabial position.

The cuneiform signs usually transliterated with ‹s, z, ṣ› were not fricatives, but affricates, as again shown by loans in Armenian. E.g., Urartian ṣa-ri ‘orchard’ ↦ Armenian ծառ caṙ ‘tree’, Urartian al-zi- ‘Arzanene (toponym)’ ↦ Armenian Աղձնի- Ałʒni-. Urartian ‹š› was loaned into Armenian as /s/: Urartian ša-ni ‘kettle’ ↦ Armenian սան san (ultimately from Sumerian via Akkadian).

The precise phonetics of emphasis is not recoverable. It possibly may have been ejectivization or glottalization /pʼ, tʼ, t͡sʼ, kʼ/ as in Semitic languages of the time and the nearby endemic languages of the Caucasus, or just plain unaspirated (and unvoiced) /p⁼, t⁼, t͡s⁼, k⁼/ as in Armenian, in either case, contrasting fully with the respective aspirated /pʰ, tʰ, t͡sʰ, kʰ/ and voiced /b, d, d͡z, g/ series. Near front vowels, /g/ was palatalized and probably merged with, or at least became perceptibly close to, /j/. A distinct /v/ is suggested by variant spellings alternating between ⟨ú⟩ and ⟨b⟩ and by the toponym rendered in Armenian as Վան Van ‘Van’ and written bi-a-i-ni- in Urartian.

Hachikian (2010) also suggests /f/ and /z/. For a phonemic /ɣ/ distinct from /x/, there is limited evidence from the Greek rendering of the toponym Κομμαγηνή Kommagēnḗ ‘Commagene’ for Urartian qu-ma-ḫa-; thus, /x/ and /ɣ/ were not orthographically distinguished.

=== Vowels ===
The script distinguishes the vowels a, e, i and u. Hachikian believes that there was an /o/ as well, as reflected in loans such as the rendition of Urartian ṭu-uš-pa- ‘Tushpa (toponym)’ as Armenian Տոսպ Tosp and Greek Θοσπ- Thosp-. There may have been phonemic vowel length, but it is not consistently expressed in the script. Word-finally, the distinction between e and i is not maintained, so many scholars transcribe the graphically vacillating vowel as a schwa: ə, while some preserve a non-reduced vowel (usually opting for i). The full form of the vowel appears when suffixes are added to the word and the vowel is no longer in the last syllable: Argištə 'Argišti' - Argištešə 'by Argišti (ergative case)'. This vowel reduction also suggests that stress was commonly on the next-to-the-last syllable.

In the morphonology, various morpheme combinations trigger syncope: *ar-it-u-mə → artumə, *zaditumə → zatumə, *ebani-ne-lə → ebanelə, *turul(e)yə → tul(e)yə.

== Morphology ==
=== Nominal morphology ===
==== Nouns ====
The morphemes which may occur in a noun follow a strict order:

slot	stem	article	possessive suffix	number and case suffix	suffixes received through Suffixaufnahme
attested morphemes	various	-ne- -na-	-uka- -i(ya)-	-Ø-, -lə-, -š(ə)-, etc. (see below)	= article + number and case suffixes

===== Stem =====
All nouns appear to end in a so-called thematic vowel - most frequently -i or -e, but -a and -u also occur. They may also end in a derivational suffix. Notable derivational suffixes are -ḫə, forming adjectives of belonging (e.g. Abiliane-ḫə 'of the tribe Abiliani', Argište-ḫə 'son of Argišti') and -šə, forming abstract nouns (e.g. alsui-šə 'greatness', ardi-šə 'order', arniu-šə 'deed').

===== Article =====
The forms of the so-called "article" are -nə (non-reduced form -ne-) for the singular, -ne-lə for the plural in the absolutive case and -na- for the other forms of the plural. They are referred to as "anaphoric suffixes" and can be compared to definite articles, although their use does not always seem to match that description exactly. They also obligatorily precede agreement suffixes added through Suffixaufnahme: e.g. Argište-šə Menua-ḫi-ne-šə 'Argišti (ergative), son of Menua (ergative)'. The plural form can also serve as a general plural marker in non-absolutive cases: arniuši-na-nə 'by the deeds'.

===== Possessive suffixes =====
The well-attested possessive suffixes are the ones of the first person singular -ukə (in non-reduced form sometimes -uka-) and of the 3rd person singular -i(yə)- (in non-reduced form sometimes -iya-): e.g. ebani-uka-nə 'from my country', ebani-yə 'his country'.

===== Number and case suffixes =====
The plural is expressed, above all, through the use of the plural "article" (-ne-lə in the absolutive case, -na- preceding the case suffix in the oblique cases), but some of the case suffixes also differ in form between the singular and the plural. Therefore, separate plural version of the case suffixes are indicated below separately. The nature of the absolutive and ergative cases is as in other ergative languages (more details in the section Syntax below).

Case endings in Urartian
	Singular	Plural
Absolutive	-Ø	-lə
Ergative	-š(ə)	
Genitive	-i	-wə
Dative	-ə	-wə
Directive	-edə (archaic plural -š-tə)	
Comitative	-ranə	
Ablative-instrumental	-nə	
Ablative	-danə	-š-tanə
Locative	-a	

Since the "complete" plural forms also include the plural definite article, they appear as -ne-lə, -na-šə, -na-wə, na-(e)də or na-š-tə, etc.

===== Suffixaufnahme =====
A phenomenon typical of Urartian is Suffixaufnahme - a process in which dependent modifiers of a noun (including genitive case modifiers) agree with the head noun by absorbing its case suffixes. The copied suffixes must be preceded by the article (also agreeing in number with the head). Examples: Ḫaldi-i-na-wə šešti-na-wə 'for the gates (dative) of [god] Ḫaldi (dative)', Argište-šə Menua-ḫi-ne-šə 'Argišti (ergative), son of Menua (ergative)'.

==== Pronouns ====
The known personal pronouns are those of the first and third person singular.

	absolutive intransitive	absolutive transitive	ergative	other	enclitic possessive	enclitic dative
1st p. sing.	ištidə	šukə	iešə	šu-	-uka-	-mə
3rd pers. sing.	manə	manə			-iya-	

The first person singular has two different forms for the absolutive case: ištidə as the absolutive subject of an intransitive verb, and šukə as the absolutive object of a transitive verb. The ergative form is iešə. Judging from correspondences with Hurrian, šu- should be the base for the "regular" case forms. An enclitic dative case suffix for the first person singular is attested as -mə.
The third person singular has the absolutive form manə.
As for possessive pronouns, besides the possessive suffixes (1st singular -uka- and 3rd singular -iya-) that were adduced above, Urartian also makes use of possessive adjectives formed with the suffix -(u)sə: 1st singular šusə, 3rd singular masə.

The encoding of pronominal ergative and absolutive participants in a verb action within the verb is treated in the section on Verbal morphology below.

Demonstrative pronouns are i-nə (plural base i-, followed by article and case forms) and ina-nə (plural base ina-, followed by article and case forms). A relative pronoun is alə.

=== Verbal morphology ===
The paradigm of the verb is only partially known. As with the noun, the morphemes that a verb may contain come in a certain sequence that can be formalized as the following "verb chain":

slot	root	root complement	ergative third person plural suffix	valency markers	modal suffix	other person suffixes (mostly absolutive)
attested morphemes	various	various	-it-	(-ul)-a-, (-ul)-i-, -u-	-l-, -in-	-də, -bə, -(a)-lə, -nə, -ə

The meaning of the root complements is unclear. The valency markers express whether the verb is intransitive or transitive. The modal suffix appears in several marked moods (but not in the indicative). The other person suffixes express mostly the absolutive subject or object. It is not clear if and how tense or aspect were signalled.

==== Valency markers ====
The valency markers are -a- (rarely -i-) for intransitivity and -u- for transitivity: for example nun-a-də 'I came' vs šidišt-u-nə 'he built'. A verb that is usually transitive can be converted to intransitivity with the suffix -ul- before the intransitive valency marker: aš-ul-a-bə 'was occupied' (vs aš-u-bə 'I put in [a garrison]').

==== Person suffixes ====
The person suffixes express the persons of the absolutive subject/object and the ergative subject. When both subject and object are present, a single transitive suffix may expresses a unique combination of persons (e.g. the combination of ergative 3rd singular and absolutive 3rd singular is marked with the suffix -nə). The following chart lists the currently ascertained endings, along with gaps for those not yet ascertained (the ellipsis marks the place of the valency vowel):

Transitive verbs
Subject	Addressed object	Suffix		
Subject	Addressed object	Transitive	Subject	Object
1. Pers. Singular	1. Pers. Singular	+ u	+ Ø	
1. Pers. Singular	3. Pers. Singular	+ u	+ Ø	+ bə
1. Pers. Singular	3. Pers. Plural	+ u	+ Ø	+ lə
3. Pers. Singular	1. Pers. Singular	+ u	+ Ø	+ də
3. Pers. Singular	3. Pers. Singular	+ u	+ Ø	+ nə
3. Pers. Singular	3. Pers. Plural	+ u	+ a	+ lə
3. Pers. Plural	1. Pers. Singular	+ u	+ itu	+ də
3. Pers. Plural	3. Pers. Singular	+ u	+ itu	+ nə
3. Pers. Plural	3. Pers. Plural	+ u	+ itu	+ lə

Intransitive Verb
		Suffix		
		Intransitive	–	Subject
1. Pers. Singular	–	+ a		+ də
3. Pers. Singular	–	+ a		+ bə
1. Pers. Plural	–	+ a		+ lə

Examples: ušt-a-də 'I marched forth'; nun-a-bə 'he came'; aš-u-bə 'I put-it in'; šidišt-u-nə 'he built-it'; ar-u-mə 'he gave [it] to me', kuy-it-u-nə 'they dedicated-it'.

As the paradigm shows, the person suffixes added after the valency vowel express mostly the person of absolutive subject/object, both in intransitive and in transitive verbs. The picture is complicated by the fact that the absolutive third person singular is expressed by a different suffix depending on whether the ergative subject is in the first or third person. An additional detail is that when the first-person singular dative suffix -mə is added, the third-person singular absolutive suffix -nə is dropped.

The encoding of the person of the absolutive subject/object is present, even though it is also explicitly mentioned in the sentence: e.g. argište-šə inə arə šu-nə 'Argišti established(-it) this granary'. An exceptional verb is man- 'to be', in that it has a transitive valency vowel, and takes no absolutive suffix for the third person singular: man-u 'it was' vs man-u-lə 'they were'.

==== Mood marking ====
The imperative is formed by the addition of the suffix -ə to the root: e.g. ar-ə 'give!'.

The jussive or third person imperative is formed by the addition of the suffix -in- in the slot of the valency vowel, whereas the persons are marked in the usual way, following an epenthetic vowel -[i]-:e.g. ar-in-[i]-nə 'may he give it', ḫa-it-in-nə 'may they take it'.

The modal suffix -l-, added between the valency vowel and the person suffixes, participates in the construction of several modal forms:

1. An optative form, also regularly used in clauses introduced with ašə 'when', is constructed by -l- followed by -ə (-i in non-reduced form) - the following absolutive person suffix is optional, and the ergative subject is apparently not signalled at all: e.g. qapqar-u-l-i-nə 'I wanted to besiege-it [the city]', urp-u-l-i-nə or urp-u-l-ə 'he shall slaughter'.

2. A conditional is expressed by a graphically similar form, which is interpreted by Wilhelm (2008) as -l- followed by -(e)yə: an example of its use is alu-šə tu-l-(e)yə 'whoever destroys it'.

3. A desiderative, which may express the wish of either the speaker or the agent, is expressed by -l- followed by a suffix -anə. The valency marker is replaced by -i-: e.g. ard-i-l-anə 'I want him to give ...', ḫa-i-l-anə 'it wants to take/conquer ...'.

Negation is expressed by the particle ui, preceding the verb. A prohibitative particle, also preceding the verb, is mi. mi is also the conjunction 'but', whereas e'ə is 'and (also)', and unə is 'or'.

==== Non-finite forms ====
Participles from intransitive verbs are formed with the suffix -urə, added to the root, and have an active meaning (e.g. ušt-u-rə 'who has marched forth'). Participles from transitive verbs are formed with the suffix -aurə, and have a passive meaning (e.g. šidaurə 'which is built'). It is possible that -umə is the ending of an infinitive or a verb noun, although that is not entirely clear.

== Syntax ==
=== Ergativity ===
Urartian is an ergative language, meaning that the subject of an intransitive verb and the object of a transitive verb are expressed identically, with the so-called absolutive case, whereas the subject of a transitive verb is expressed with a special ergative case. Examples are: Argištə nun-a-bi 'Argišti came' vs Argište-šə arə šu-nə 'Argišti established a granary'. Within the limited number of known forms, no exceptions from the ergative pattern are known. Example:

Urartian	Meaning	Comments
ereli+Ø nun+a+bi	The king is coming.	ereli 'king' stands in absolutive. The verb has a marker of intransitivity -a-.
ereli+še esi+Ø tur+u+Ø+ni	The king destroys a place.	ereli stands in Ergative, esi 'land' in absolutive. The verb has a marker of transitivity -u-.

==== Word Order ====
The word order is usually verb-final, and, more specifically, SOV (where S refers to the ergative agent), but the rule is not rigid and components are occasionally re-arranged for expressive purposes. For example, names of gods are often placed first, even though they are in oblique cases: Ḫaldi-ə ewri-ə inə E_{2} Argište-šə Menuaḫini-šə šidišt-u-nə 'For Ḫaldi the lord Argišti, son of Menua, built this temple.' Verbs can be placed sentence-initially in vivid narratives: ušt-a-də Mana-idə ebanə at-u-bə 'Forth I marched towards Mana, and I consumed the land.'

Nominal modifiers usually follow their heads (erelə tarayə 'great king'), but deictic pronouns such as inə precede them, and genitives may either precede or follow them. Urartian generally uses postpositions (e.g. ed(i)-i-nə 'for', ed(i)-i-a - both originally case forms of edi 'person, body' - pei 'under', etc..) which govern certain cases (often ablative-instrumental). There is only one attested preposition, parə 'to(wards)'. Subordinate clauses are introduced by particles such as iu 'when', ašə 'when', alə 'that which'.

== Language sample ==
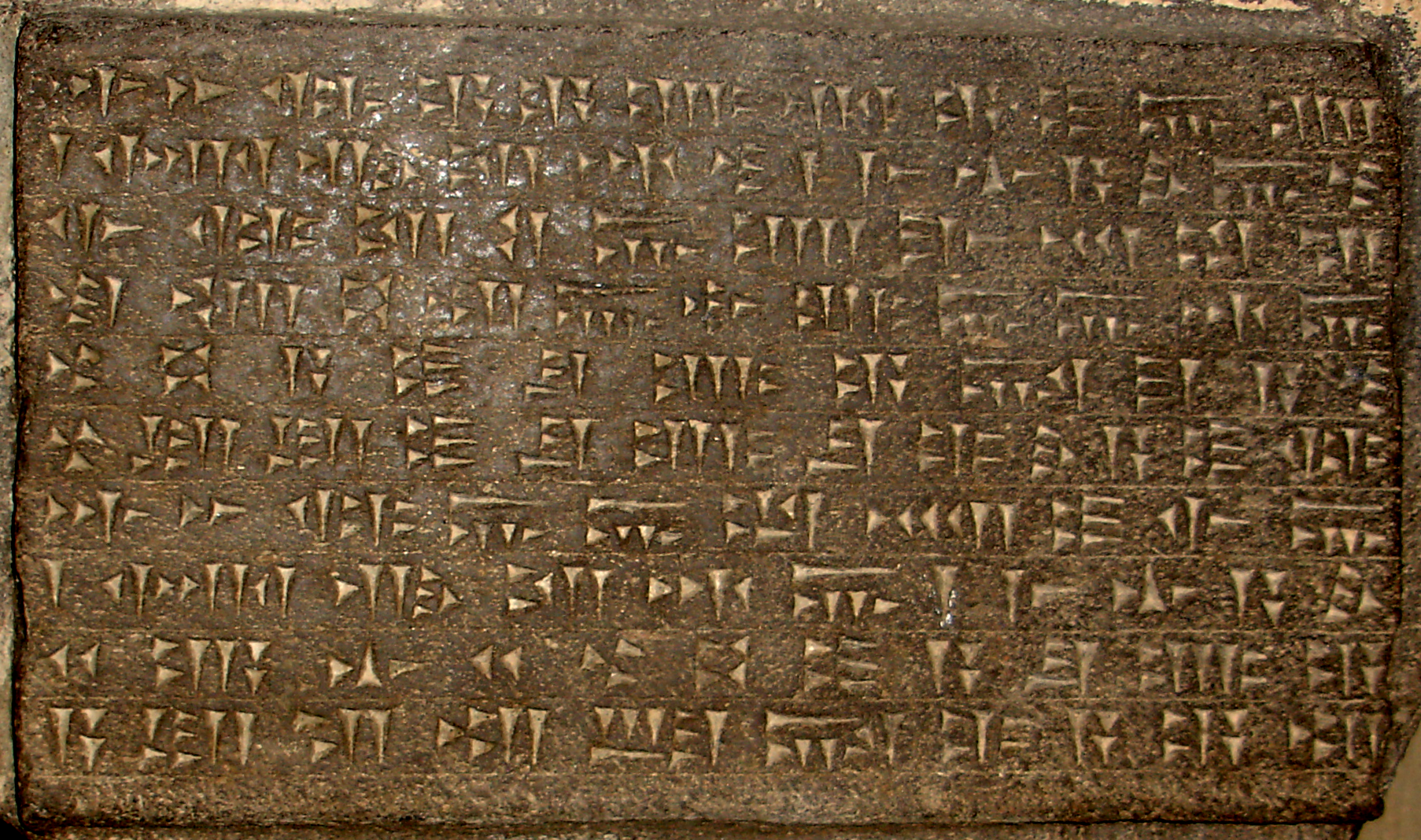
The original text of the provided sample, Erebuni Museum, Yerevan

An inscription on a large basalt stone from Erebuni Fortress was found during excavations in 1968. The block measures approximately 60 cm in height, 80 cm in width, and 70 cm in depth and is now in the Erebuni Museum in Yerevan. The stone is titled "Foundation Inscription (A 8-18)" and consists of 10 lines.

𒀭𒄬𒁲𒂊 𒂊𒌑𒊑𒂊 𒄿𒉌 𒂍 𒁹𒅈𒄀𒅖𒋾𒊺 𒁹𒈨𒉡𒀀𒄭𒉌𒊺 𒅆𒁲𒅖𒌅𒉌 𒂍𒃲 𒁀𒁺𒋛
^{d}hal-di-e e-ú-ri-e i-ni É ^{DIŠ}mar-gi-iš-ti-še ^{DIŠ}me-nu-a-ḫi-ni-še ši-di-iš-tú-ni É.GAL ba-du-si
Ḫaldi=ə euri=ə ini É Argišti=šə Menua=ḫi=ni=šə šidišt=u=nə É.GAL badusi
"For the god Ḫaldi, the (or, resp., his) Lord, Argišti, son of Minua, built this building, and a fortress to perfection."

𒋼𒊒𒁉 𒌷𒅕𒁍𒌑𒉌𒉌 𒋾𒉌 𒆳𒁉𒀀𒄿𒈾𒌑𒂊 𒍑𒈠𒀀𒊺 𒆳𒇻𒇻𒄿𒈾𒌑𒄿 𒈾𒉺𒄭𒀀𒄿𒁲
te-ru-bi ^{URU}er-bu-ú-ni-ni ti-ni ^{KUR}bi-a-i-na-ú-e uš-ma-a-še ^{KUR}lu-lu-i-na-ú-i na-pa-ḫi-a-i-di
teru=bə Erebuni=ni tini Biainau=ə ušma=šə Luluinau=i napaḫi=edə
"I gave it the name Erbuni; as protection of the Bia lands, and for the intimidation of the enemy land."

𒀭𒄬𒁲𒉌𒉌 𒀠𒋢𒄿𒅆𒉌 𒁹𒅈𒄀𒅖𒋾𒉌 𒁹𒈨𒉡𒀀𒄭 𒎙 𒆗𒉡 𒎙 𒆳𒁉𒄿𒀀𒈾𒌑𒂊 𒀀𒇻𒋛 𒌷𒌅𒍑𒉺𒀀𒂊 𒌷
^{d}ḫal-di-ni-ni al-su-i-ši-ni ^{DIŠ}mar-gi-iš-ti-ni ^{DIŠ}me-nu-a-ḫi MAN DAN-NU MAN ^{KUR}bi-i-a-na-ú-e a-lu-si ^{URU}ṭu-uš-pa-a-e URU
Ḫaldi=ni=nə alsui=ši=nə Argišti=nə Menua=ḫi MAN DAN-NU MAN Biainau=ə alusi Ṭušpa=ə URU
"Through the greatness of the god Ḫaldi (I am) Argišti, son of Minua, strong king, king of the Bia lands, lord of Ṭušpa-City."

== Shared lexicon with Armenian ==
Diakonoff (1985) and Greppin (1991) present etymologies of several Old Armenian words as having a possible Hurro-Urartian origin. Contemporary linguists, such as Hrach Martirosyan, have rejected many of the Hurro-Urartian origins for these words and instead suggest native Armenian etymologies, leaving the possibility that these words may have been loaned into Hurro-Urartian from Armenian, and not vice versa.

- agarak 'field' from Hurrian awari 'field' (however, alternate theories suggest that this is an Armenian word from Proto-Indo-European h₂éǵros or a Sumerian loan);
- ałaxin 'slave girl' from Hurrian al(l)a(e)ḫḫenne;
- arciw 'eagle' from Urartian Arṣiba, a proper name with a presumed meaning of 'eagle' (more recent scholarship suggests that this is an Armenian word from Proto-Indo-European *h₂r̥ǵipyós which was loaned into Urartian);
- art 'field' from Hurrian arde 'town' (rejected by Diakonoff and Fournet);
- astem 'to reveal one's ancestry' from Hurrian ašti 'woman, wife';
- caṙ 'tree' from Urartian ṣârə 'garden' (an alternate etymology suggests that this is an Armenian word from Proto-Indo-European *ǵr̥so);
- cov (cf. Armenian Covinar) 'sea' from Urartian ṣûǝ '(inland) sea' (an alternate theory suggests that this comes from a Proto-Indo-European root);
- kut 'grain' from Hurrian kade 'barley' (rejected by Diakonoff; closer to Greek kodomeýs 'barley-roaster');
- maxr ~ marx 'pine' from Hurrian māḫri 'fir, juniper';
- pełem 'dig, excavate' from Urartian pile 'canal', Hurrian pilli (rejected by Diakonoff, others have suggested an origin stemming from Proto-Indo-European *bel- ("to dig, cut off?");
- salor ~ šlor 'plum' from Hurrian *s̄all-orə or Urartian *šaluri (cf. Akkadian šallūru 'plum');
- san 'kettle' from Urartian sane 'kettle, pot';
- sur 'sword', from Urartian šure 'sword', Hurrian šawri 'weapon, spear' (considered doubtful by Diakonoff, contemporary linguists believe this is an Armenian word from the Proto-Indo-European root *ḱeh₃ro-, meaning 'sharp');
- tarma-ǰur 'spring water' from Hurrian tarman(l)i 'spring' (an alternate etymology suggests that at least ǰur has an Armenian etymology from Proto-Indo-European *yuHr- or gʷʰdyōro-);
- ułt 'camel' from Hurrian uḷtu 'camel';
- xarxarel 'to destroy' from Urartian harhar-š- 'to destroy';
- xnjor 'apple' from Hurrian ḫinzuri 'apple' (itself from Akkadian hašhūru, šahšūru).

Arnaud Fournet, Hrach Martirosyan, and Armen Petrosyan propose additional borrowed words of Armenian origin loaned into Urartian and vice versa, including grammatical words and parts of speech, such as Urartian eue 'and', attested in the earliest Urartian texts and likely a loan from Armenian (compare to Armenian ew (եւ), ultimately from Proto-Indo-European *h₁epi). Other loans from Armenian into Urartian include personal names, toponyms, and names of deities. A more recent study by Zsolt Simon is far more sceptical, suggesting that fewer than 10 Armenian words are of assuredly Hurro-Urartian origin, and that no secure loans can be established in the other direction.

== See also ==
- Urartu
- Urartians
- Hurrians
- Hurrian language
- Proto-Armenian
- Mehmet Kuşman

== Literature ==
- Хачикян, Маргарит Левоновна (2010). Урартский язык [The Urartian Language]. In Казанский, Николай Н.; Кибрик, А. А.; Коряков, Ю. Б. (eds.). Языки мира: Древние реликтовые языки Передней Азии [Languages of the World: Ancient Dead Languages of Western Asia] (in Russian). Moskow: Academia.
- Walker, C. B. F. (1996). "Cuneiform". Reading the Past. London: British Museum Press. ISBN 0-7141-8077-7.
- Friedrich, Johannes (1969). "Urartäisch" [Urartian]. Altkleinasiatische Sprachen [The Ancient Languages of Asia Minor]. Handbuch der Orientalistik (in German). Vol. I.2, 1/2, 1. Leiden/New York/Cologne: Brill. pp. 31–53.
- Wilhelm, Gernot (2008). "Urartian". In Woodard, Roger D. (ed.). The Ancient Languages of Asia Minor. Cambridge: Cambridge University Press. pp. 105–123. ISBN 978-0-521-68496-5.
- Ivanov, Vyacheslav V. (1996). "Comparative Notes on Hurro-Urartian, Northern Caucasian and Indo-European"". In Ivanov, Vyacheslav V.; Vine, Brent (eds.). UCLA Indo European Studies. Vol. 1.
- Salvini, Mirjo (1995). Geschichte und Kultur der Urartäer [History and Culture of the Urartians] (in German). Darmstadt: Wissenschaftliche Buchgesellschaft. ISBN 9783534018703.
- Klein, Jeffrey J. (1974). "Urartian Hieroglyphic Inscriptions from Altintepe". Anatolian Studies. 24: 77–94. doi:10.2307/3642600. JSTOR 3642600.
