= Demirpınar =

Demirpınar can refer to:

- Demirpınar, Merzifon
- Demirpınar, Üzümlü
