= Pelitli (disambiguation) =

Pelitli can refer to:

- Pelitli
- Pelitli, Bayburt
- Pelitli, Devrek
- Pelitli, Pasinler
- Pelitli, Üzümlü
