= Büyükköy =

Büyükköy can refer to:

- Büyükköy, Çayeli, a town in Rize Province
- Büyükköy, İliç
- Büyükköy, Korkuteli
- Büyükköy, Üzümlü
