= Soylu =

Soylu is a Turkish surname. Notable people with the surname include:

- İpek Soylu (born 1996), Turkish female tennis player
- Seyhan Soylu (born 1988), director of Turkish television channel Kanal T
- Süleyman Soylu (born 1969), Turkish politician
- Soylu, Hani
