= Avcılar =

Avcılar (Turkish for 'hunters') may refer to the following places in Turkey:

- Avcılar, Istanbul, a neighborhood on the European side of the metropolis
- Avcılar, Ardanuç, a village in the District of Ardanuç, Artvin Province
- Avcılar, Borçka, a village in the District of Borçka, Artvin Province
- Avcılar, Hınıs
- Avcılar, Söke, a village in the District of Söke, Aydın Province
- Avcılar, Üzümlü
- Avcılar, Yüreğir, a village in the District of Yüreğir, Adana Province
- Avcılar, Yusufeli, a village in the District of Yusufeli, Artvin Province
- Avcılar is also an old name for Göreme in Cappadocia.
