= Otluk =

Otluk can refer to:

- Otluk, İmamoğlu
- Otluk, Sandıklı
- Otluk, Silvan
- Otluk, Üzümlü
