= Bağcılar, Bağlar =

Bağcılar
- Neighbourhood
- Location within Turkey
- Coordinates: 37.915764°N 40.168931°E
- Country: Turkey
- Province: Diyarbakır
- District: Bağlar
- Population (2025): 160,136
- Time zone: UTC+3 (TRT)
- Postal code: 21050
- Area code: 412

Bağcılar is a neighbourhood in the municipality and district of Bağlar, Diyarbakır Province, Turkey. Its population is 160,136 (2025).

== Population ==
Historical population
Year	Pop.	±% p.a.
2007	15,528	—
2008	15,710	+1.17%
2009	18,405	+17.15%
2010	22,436	+21.90%
2011	28,406	+26.61%
2012	36,989	+30.22%
2013	48,023	+29.83%
2014	61,862	+28.82%
2015	75,746	+22.44%
2016	89,220	+17.79%
2017	103,690	+16.22%
2018	115,227	+11.13%
2019	127,839	+10.95%
2020	134,812	+5.45%
2021	141,011	+4.60%
2022	149,194	+5.80%
2023	151,459	+1.52%
2024	157,422	+3.94%
2025	160,136	+1.72%
Source: TÜİK
