= Balabanlı =

Balabanlı can refer to:

- Balabanlı, Ayvacık
- Balabanlı, Üzümlü
