= Kuyular, Hani =

Village in Turkey

Kuyular
- Neighbourhood
- Location in Turkey
- Coordinates: 38°25′55″N 40°16′37″E
- Country: Turkey
- Province: Diyarbakır
- District: Hani
- Population (2022): 3,019
- Time zone: UTC+3 (TRT)

Kuyular (Kurdish: Nêribê axon) is a neighbourhood of the municipality and district of Hani, Diyarbakır Province, Turkey. It is populated by Kurds and had a population of 3,019 in 2022.

Before the 2013 reorganisation, it was a town (belde).
