= Yukarıturalı, Hani =

Village in Turkey

Yukarıturalı
- Neighbourhood
- Location in Turkey
- Coordinates: 38.4640°N 40.4596°E
- Country: Turkey
- Province: Diyarbakır
- District: Hani
- Population (2022): 659
- Time zone: UTC+3 (TRT)

Yukarıturalı (Kurdish: Şel) is a neighbourhood in the municipality and district of Hani, Diyarbakır Province in Turkey. It is populated by Kurds and had a population of 659 in 2022.
