= Okurköy, Hani =

Village in Turkey

Okurköy
- Neighbourhood
- Location in Turkey
- Coordinates: 38°23′N 40°23′E
- Country: Turkey
- Province: Diyarbakır
- District: Hani
- Population (2022): 144
- Time zone: UTC+3 (TRT)

Okurköy (Kurdish: Cumayig) is a neighbourhood in the municipality and district of Hani, Diyarbakır Province in Turkey. It is populated by Kurds and had a population of 144 in 2022.
