= Kaledibi, Hani =

Village in Turkey

Kaledibi
- Neighbourhood
- Location in Turkey
- Coordinates: 38.5272°N 40.3636°E
- Country: Turkey
- Province: Diyarbakır
- District: Hani
- Population (2022): 709
- Time zone: UTC+3 (TRT)

Kaledibi (Kurdish: Sayêre) is a neighbourhood in the municipality and district of Hani, Diyarbakır Province in Turkey. It is populated by Kurds and had a population of 709 in 2022.
