= Kalaba, Hani =

Village in Turkey

Kalaba
- Neighbourhood
- Location in Turkey
- Coordinates: 38°26′9″N 40°25′3″E
- Country: Turkey
- Province: Diyarbakır
- District: Hani
- Population (2022): 326
- Time zone: UTC+3 (TRT)

Kalaba (Kurdish: Babêx) is a neighbourhood in the municipality and district of Hani, Diyarbakır Province in Turkey. It is populated by Kurds and had a population of 326 in 2022.
