= Esenyurt, Üzümlü =

Village in Erzincan Province, Turkey

Esenyurt
- Village
- Location within Turkey
- Coordinates: 39.648°N 40.053°E
- Country: Turkey
- Province: Erzincan
- District: Üzümlü
- Population (2021): 45
- Time zone: UTC+3 (TRT)

Esenyurt (Kurdish: Şevşek) is a village in the Üzümlü District, Erzincan Province, Turkey. The village is populated by Kurds of the Hormek tribe and had a population of 45 in 2021.

The hamlets of Harmanlık and İnandık are attached to the village.
