= Gürbüz, Hani =

Village in Turkey

Gürbüz
- Neighbourhood
- Location in Turkey
- Coordinates: 38°22′45″N 40°21′45″E
- Country: Turkey
- Province: Diyarbakır
- District: Hani
- Population (2022): 5,550
- Time zone: UTC+3 (TRT)

Gürbüz (Kurdish: Cewzi) is a neighbourhood of the municipality and district of Hani, Diyarbakır Province, Turkey. It is populated by Kurds and had a population of 5,550 in 2022.

Before the 2013 reorganisation, it was a town (belde).
