= Uzunlar, Hani =

Village in Turkey

Uzunlar
- Neighbourhood
- Location in Turkey
- Coordinates: 38°24′52″N 40°27′19″E
- Country: Turkey
- Province: Diyarbakır
- District: Hani
- Population (2022): 711
- Time zone: UTC+3 (TRT)

Uzunlar (Kurdish: Tawil) is a neighbourhood in the municipality and district of Hani, Diyarbakır Province in Turkey. It is populated by Kurds and had a population of 711 in 2022.
