= Karacalar, Üzümlü =

Village in Erzincan Province, Turkey

Karacalar
- Village
- Location within Turkey
- Coordinates: 39.611°N 39.920°E
- Country: Turkey
- Province: Erzincan
- District: Üzümlü
- Population (2021): 52
- Time zone: UTC+3 (TRT)

Karacalar is a village in the Üzümlü District, Erzincan Province, Turkey. The village is populated by Kurds of the Balaban tribe and had a population of 52 in 2021.

The hamlet of Heybeli is attached to the village.
