= Çamlıca, Üzümlü =

Village in Erzincan Province, Turkey

Çamlıca
- Village
- Location within Turkey
- Coordinates: 39.618°N 40.014°E
- Country: Turkey
- Province: Erzincan
- District: Üzümlü
- Population (2021): 68
- Time zone: UTC+3 (TRT)

Çamlıca (Kurdish: Dîlav) is a village in the Üzümlü District, Erzincan Province, Turkey. The village had a population of 68 in 2021.

The hamlet of Alancık is attached to the village.
