= Serenköy, Hani =

Village in Turkey

Serenköy
- Neighbourhood
- Location in Turkey
- Coordinates: 38°24′N 40°31′E
- Country: Turkey
- Province: Diyarbakır
- District: Hani
- Population (2022): 193
- Time zone: UTC+3 (TRT)

Serenköy (Kurdish: Serd) is a neighbourhood in the municipality and district of Hani, Diyarbakır Province in Turkey. It is populated by Kurds and had a population of 193 in 2022.
