= Karakaya, Üzümlü =

Village in Erzincan Province, Turkey

Karakaya
- Village
- Location within Turkey
- Coordinates: 39.679°N 39.755°E
- Country: Turkey
- Province: Erzincan
- District: Üzümlü
- Population (2021): 665
- Time zone: UTC+3 (TRT)

Karakaya is a village in the Üzümlü District, Erzincan Province, Turkey. It had a population of 665 in 2021. Before the 2013 reorganisation, it was a town (belde).
