= Pişkidağ, Üzümlü =

Village in Erzincan Province, Turkey

Pişkidağ
- Village
- Location within Turkey
- Coordinates: 39.667°N 39.760°E
- Country: Turkey
- Province: Erzincan
- District: Üzümlü
- Population (2021): 283
- Time zone: UTC+3 (TRT)

Pişkidağ is a village in the Üzümlü District, Erzincan Province, Turkey. had a population of 283 in 2021.

The hamlet of Gökbayır is attached to the village.
