= Derebük, Üzümlü =

Village in Erzincan Province, Turkey

Derebük
- Village
- Location within Turkey
- Coordinates: 39.596°N 39.908°E
- Country: Turkey
- Province: Erzincan
- District: Üzümlü
- Population (2021): 24
- Time zone: UTC+3 (TRT)

Derebük is a village in the Üzümlü District, Erzincan Province, Turkey. The village is populated by Kurds of the Demenan, Kurêşan and Lolan tribes and had a population of 24 in 2021.
