= Sergen, Hani =

Village in Turkey

Sergen
- Neighbourhood
- Location in Turkey
- Coordinates: 38°18′58″N 40°21′50″E
- Country: Turkey
- Province: Diyarbakır
- District: Hani
- Population (2022): 1,186
- Time zone: UTC+3 (TRT)

Sergen (Kurdish: Sipiri) is a neighbourhood in the municipality and district of Hani, Diyarbakır Province in Turkey. It is populated by Kurds and had a population of 1,186 in 2022.
