= Kırım, Hani =

Village in Turkey

Kırım
- Neighbourhood
- Location in Turkey
- Coordinates: 38°22′38″N 40°27′3″E
- Country: Turkey
- Province: Diyarbakır
- District: Hani
- Population (2022): 992
- Time zone: UTC+3 (TRT)

Kırım (Kurdish: Qadişt) is a neighbourhood in the municipality and district of Hani, Diyarbakır Province in Turkey. It is populated by Kurds and had a population of 992 in 2022.
