= Üzümlü =

Municipality in Erzincan Province, Turkey

- Municipality
- Location in Turkey
- Coordinates: 39°42′36″N 39°42′06″E
- Country: Turkey
- Province: Erzincan
- District: Üzümlü
- Population (2021): 8,325
- Time zone: UTC+3 (TRT)
- Website: www.uzumlu.bel.tr

Üzümlü (Turkish: [yˈzymly] is a municipality (belde) and seat of Üzümlü District of Erzincan Province in Turkey. It had a population of 8,325 in 2021.

It is divided into the neighborhoods of Babacan, Bahçeşehir, Ciminlibaba, Çavuşlu, Çay, Fatih, Geyikli, Mimar Sinan, Muhsin Yazıcıoğlu, Oruçlu, Pirisami, Terzibaba, Üçler, Yavuz Selim and Yunusemre.

Meskhetian Turks from Ukraine were settled in the town in 2016.

== Sights ==
- Altıntepe fortress, an ancient Urartian site.
