= Yayvan, Hani =

Village in Turkey

Yayvan
- Neighbourhood
- Location in Turkey
- Coordinates: 38°19′N 40°26′E
- Country: Turkey
- Province: Diyarbakır
- District: Hani
- Population (2022): 383
- Time zone: UTC+3 (TRT)

Yayvan (Kurdish: Tiletîn) is a neighbourhood in the municipality and district of Hani, Diyarbakır Province in Turkey. It is populated by Kurds and had a population of 383 in 2022.
