= Mehmet Kuşman =

Turkish guard and linguist (born 1940)

- Born: 1940 (age 85–86); Van, Turkey
- Occupation: Guard at Çavuştepe
- Known for: Knowledge of the Urartian language
- Awards: Troy Special Award

Mehmet Kuşman (born 1940) is a Turkish linguist and a retired guard at Çavuştepe, an ancient Urartian fortified site in eastern Turkey. Turkish sources claim that he is one of only twelve people in the world who can read and write the Urartian language.

== Early life ==
Mehmet Kuşman was born in Van as the child of a farmer family. After finishing primary school, he worked as a farmer with his father until he went to the army. He is married and has eleven children.

== Career ==
After completing his military service, Kuşman started to work as a guard in the Çavuştepe Castle built by the Urartians between 764 and 735 BC, located along a road near Van leading to Hakkari. Despite being a primary school graduate, he started to learn the Urartian script from the people who came to the region for excavation work and the books they gave. He travelled to many cities of Iran, Armenia, Syria and Turkey to learn Urartian and learned the Urartian script in three years.

He has been invited to symposiums in Ankara several times by the Ministry of Culture and Tourism of the Republic of Turkey. Turkish sources also claim that Kuşman was invited to the United States by the Governor of the State of California. Although he was offered a 14-year visa in exchange for one year of Urartian education, this supposed offer was rejected by Mehmet Kuşman's family. Mehmet Kuşman retired from Çavuştepe Castle, but continues to be active there at the invitation of the Ministry of Culture and Tourism of the Republic of Turkey. As part of his duty, Mehmet Kuşman guides the tourists who come to the castle and translates Urartian inscriptions for them.

Urartian Chechen claim

İlber Ortaylı claimed in one of his seminars that the Urartians were Chechens. Ortaylı mentioned Mehmet Kușman in a part of the book he wrote and made the specious claim that the Urartians had nothing to do with the Armenians. Mehmet Kuşman's learning of the Urartian language led to the emergence of the claim that the Urartian language is related to Chechen.

== Documentary ==
The documentary Son Urartulu (Last Urartian) about Mehmet Kuşman was made by DW Turkish.

== Awards ==
“Troy Special Award”
