= Hani, Turkey =

Town and district of Diyarbakır, Turkey

Hani
- District and municipality
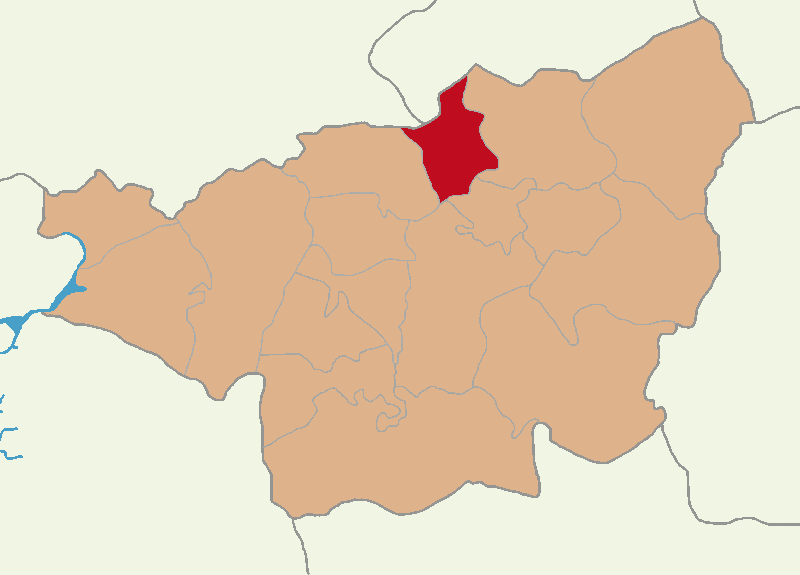
- Map showing Hani District in Diyarbakır Province

- Location in Turkey
- Coordinates: 38°24′49″N 40°23′33″E
- Country: Turkey
- Province: Diyarbakır

Government
  - Mayor: Besile Narin (DEM)
- Area: 436 km^{2} (168 sq mi)
- Population (2022): 32,519
  - Density: 75/km^{2} (190/sq mi)
- Time zone: UTC+3 (TRT)
- Postal code: 21800
- Area code: 0412
- Website: www.hani.bel.tr

Hani (Kurdish: Hênî, lit. 'fountain'), formerly known as Palimaden (Ottoman Turkish: پالیمعدن), is a municipality and district of Diyarbakır Province, Turkey. Its area is 436 km^{2}, and its population is 32,519 (2022). It is populated by Kurds.

== History ==
The locals in Hani took part in the Sheikh Said rebellion in 1925. Subsequently, the town experienced special surveillance and scrutiny from the state.

== Politics ==
After the victory of the Democratic Regions Party (DBP) in the local elections in 2014, Hani became a hotspot for the women movement in Diyarbakır Province. A women's center was opened in presence of the Metropolitan Mayor of Diyarbakır, Gültan Kışanak. The DBP mayor was dismissed over alleged links with the Kurdistan Workers' Party in October 2016 and a trustee was imposed by the Ministry of the interior. In the local elections of March 2019 İbrahim Lale of the Justice and Development Party (AKP) was elected mayor.

== Composition ==
There are 26 neighbourhoods in Hani District:

- Abacılar
- Akçayurt
- Anıl
- Belen
- Çardaklı
- Çarşı
- Çukurköy
- Dereli
- Gömeç
- Gürbüz
- Kalaba
- Kaledibi
- Kırım
- Kuyular
- Merkez
- Okurköy
- Serenköy
- Sergen
- Soylu
- Süslü
- Topçular
- Uzunlar
- Veziri
- Yayvan
- Yukarıturalı
- Zirve
