= Üzümlü District =

District of Erzincan Province, Turkey

- District
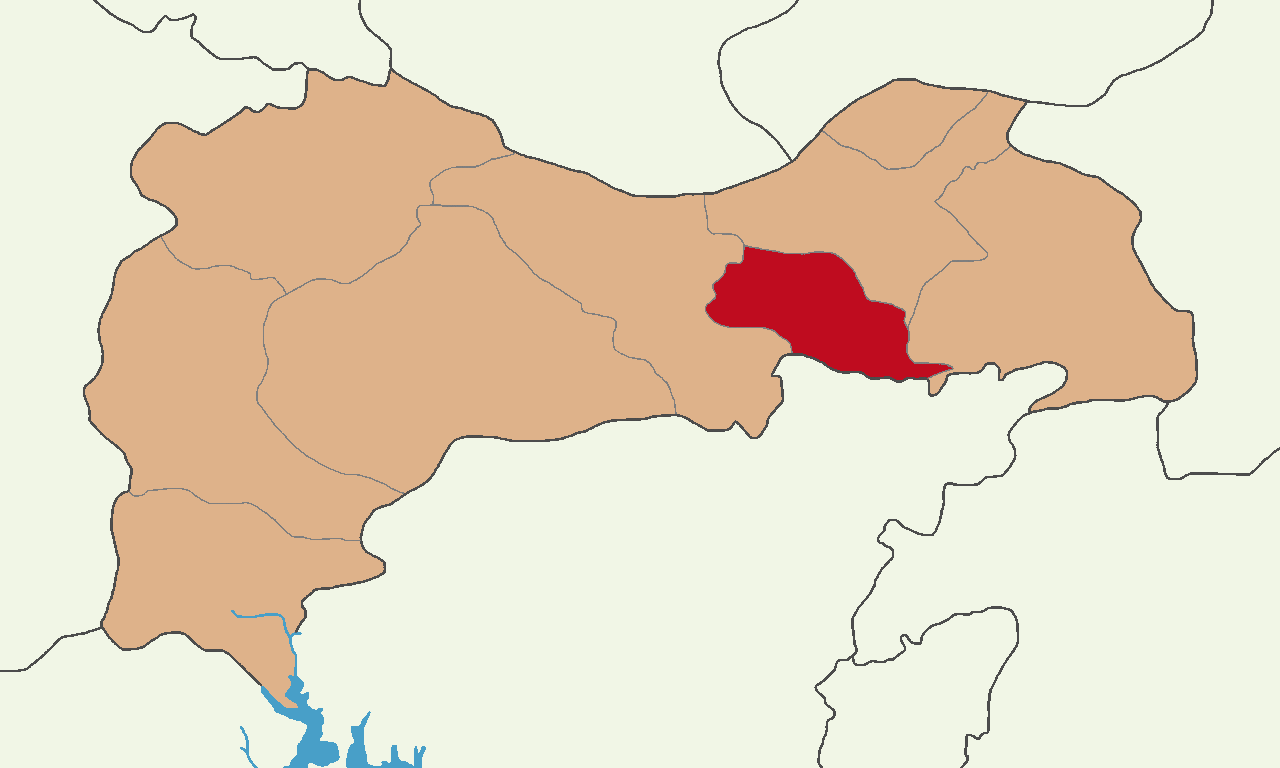
- Map showing Üzümlü District in Erzincan Province

- Location in Turkey
- Coordinates: 39°40′N 39°52′E
- Country: Turkey
- Province: Erzincan
- Seat: Üzümlü
- Area: 591 km^{2} (228 sq mi)
- Population (2021): 13,928
  - Density: 24/km^{2} (61/sq mi)
- Time zone: UTC+3 (TRT)
- Website: www.uzumlu.gov.tr

Üzümlü District is a district of Erzincan Province in Turkey. The municipality of Üzümlü is the seat and the district had a population of 13,928 in 2021. Its area is 591 km^{2}.

The district was established in 1987.

== Composition ==
There are two municipalities in Üzümlü District:

- Altınbaşak
- Üzümlü

There are 23 villages in Üzümlü District:

- Avcılar
- Bağlar
- Balabanlı
- Bayırbağ
- Bulanık
- Büyükköy
- Çadırtepe
- Çamlıca
- Çardaklı
- Çayıryazı
- Demirpınar
- Denizdamı
- Derebük
- Esenyurt
- Göller
- Karacalar
- Karakaya
- Kureyşlisarıkaya
- Ocakbaşı
- Otluk
- Pelitli
- Pınarlıkaya
- Pişkidağ

Furthermore, the district encompasses 57 hamlets.
