= Çayıryazı, Üzümlü =

Village in Erzincan Province, Turkey

Çayıryazı
- Village
- Location within Turkey
- Coordinates: 39.661°N 39.985°E
- Country: Turkey
- Province: Erzincan
- District: Üzümlü
- Population (2021): 19
- Time zone: UTC+3 (TRT)

Çayıryazı (Kurdish: Zurun) is a village in the Üzümlü District, Erzincan Province, Turkey. The village is populated by Kurds of the Bamasur and Kurêşan tribes and had a population of 19 in 2021.
