= Kureyşlisarıkaya, Üzümlü =

Village in Erzincan Province, Turkey

Kureyşlisarıkaya
- Village
- Location within Turkey
- Coordinates: 39.701°N 39.835°E
- Country: Turkey
- Province: Erzincan
- District: Üzümlü
- Population (2021): 63
- Time zone: UTC+3 (TRT)

Kureyşlisarıkaya (Kurdish: Kureyş) is a village in the Üzümlü District, Erzincan Province, Turkey. The village is populated by Kurds of the Alan and Lolan tribes and had a population of 63 in 2021.

The hamlets of Ahmetağa, Akören, Aydoğdu, Hasanağa, Hubar, Ilıçlı, Kazmalı, Memiliağa, Sarıca and Tekdam are attached to the village.
