= Gömeç, Hani =

Village in Turkey

Gömeç
- Neighbourhood
- Location in Turkey
- Coordinates: 38°21′35″N 40°31′41″E
- Country: Turkey
- Province: Diyarbakır
- District: Hani
- Population (2022): 149
- Time zone: UTC+3 (TRT)

Gömeç (Kurdish: Hûr, Horik) is a neighbourhood in the municipality and district of Hani, Diyarbakır Province in Turkey. It is populated by Kurds and had a population of 149 in 2022.
