= Bağlar =

Bağlar may refer to:

- Bağlar, Diyarbakır, Turkey
- Zağulba Bağları, Azerbaijan
- Bağlar, Üzümlü
