= Ocakbaşı, Üzümlü =

Village in Erzincan Province, Turkey

Ocakbaşı
- Village
- Location within Turkey
- Coordinates: 39.603°N 39.907°E
- Country: Turkey
- Province: Erzincan
- District: Üzümlü
- Population (2021): 62
- Time zone: UTC+3 (TRT)

Ocakbaşı (Kurdish: Selepur) is a village in the Üzümlü District, Erzincan Province, Turkey. The village is populated by Kurds of the Balaban tribe and had a population of 62 in 2021.

The hamlets of Akçalı, Ayranlı and Salkımlı are attached to the village.
