= Çadırtepe, Üzümlü =

Village in Erzincan Province, Turkey

Çadırtepe
- Village
- Location within Turkey
- Coordinates: 39.708°N 39.657°E
- Country: Turkey
- Province: Erzincan
- District: Üzümlü
- Population (2021): 172
- Time zone: UTC+3 (TRT)

Çadırtepe is a village in the Üzümlü District, Erzincan Province, Turkey. It had a population of 172 in 2021.
