= Süslü, Hani =

Village in Turkey

Süslü
- Neighbourhood
- Location in Turkey
- Coordinates: 38°23′05″N 40°18′47″E
- Country: Turkey
- Province: Diyarbakır
- District: Hani
- Population (2022): 367
- Time zone: UTC+3 (TRT)

Süslü (Kurdish: Risnî) is a neighbourhood in the municipality and district of Hani, Diyarbakır Province in Turkey. It is populated by Kurds and had a population of 367 in 2022.
