= Belen, Hani =

Village in Turkey

Belen
- Neighbourhood
- Location in Turkey
- Coordinates: 38.4186°N 40.3546°E
- Country: Turkey
- Province: Diyarbakır
- District: Hani
- Population (2022): 1,693
- Time zone: UTC+3 (TRT)

Belen (Kurdish: Dilbi) is a neighbourhood in the municipality and district of Hani, Diyarbakır Province in Turkey. It is populated by Kurds and had a population of 1,693 in 2022.
