= Abacılar, Hani =

Village in Turkey

Abacılar
- Neighbourhood
- Location in Turkey
- Coordinates: 38.4342°N 40.3055°E
- Country: Turkey
- Province: Diyarbakır
- District: Hani
- Population (2022): 850
- Time zone: UTC+3 (TRT)

Abacılar (Kurdish: Nêribî çulagan) is a neighbourhood in the municipality and district of Hani, Diyarbakır Province in Turkey. It is populated by Kurds and had a population of 850 in 2022.
