= Altınbaşak, Üzümlü =

Village in Erzincan Province, Turkey

Altınbaşak
- Municipality
- Location in Turkey
- Coordinates: 39.666°N 39.677°E
- Country: Turkey
- Province: Erzincan
- District: Üzümlü
- Population (2021): 2,027
- Time zone: UTC+3 (TRT)

Altınbaşak is a municipality (belde) in the Üzümlü District, Erzincan Province, Turkey. It had a population of 2,027 in 2021.

The municipality is divided into the neighborhoods of Büyükkadağan, Fırat, İstasyon, Küçük Kadağan, Pınarbaşı and Süleymanlı.
