= Akçayurt, Hani =

Village in Turkey

Akçayurt
- Neighbourhood
- Location in Turkey
- Coordinates: 38.4852°N 40.3685°E
- Country: Turkey
- Province: Diyarbakır
- District: Hani
- Population (2022): 65
- Time zone: UTC+3 (TRT)

Akçayurt (Kurdish: Derno) is a neighbourhood in the municipality and district of Hani, Diyarbakır Province in Turkey. The village is populated by Kurds and had a population of 65 in 2022.

== Disappearance of the village muhtar ==
A Kurdish muhtar (elected village head) after being released stated in a press statement that he had been tortured by Turkish gendarmes while in custody and forced to tell television journalists the PKK had burned his village, he stated when in fact it was the Turkish military who burned the village. On 18 August 1994 when returning to his village an eye-witness stated he was detained and taken via helicopter. He has not been seen since.
