= Bayırbağ, Üzümlü =

Village in Erzincan Province, Turkey

Bayırbağ
- Village
- Location within Turkey
- Coordinates: 39.697°N 39.720°E
- Country: Turkey
- Province: Erzincan
- District: Üzümlü
- Population (2021): 1,351
- Time zone: UTC+3 (TRT)

Bayırbağ is a village in the Üzümlü District, Erzincan Province, Turkey. As of 2021, Bayırbağ reported a population of 1,351. Before the 2013 reorganisation, it was a belde (town).
