= Pınarlıkaya, Üzümlü =

Village in Erzincan Province, Turkey

Pınarlıkaya
- Village
- Location within Turkey
- Coordinates: 39.647°N 39.870°E
- Country: Turkey
- Province: Erzincan
- District: Üzümlü
- Population (2021): 58
- Time zone: UTC+3 (TRT)

Pınarlıkaya (Kurdish: Hinzorî) is a village in the Üzümlü District, Erzincan Province, Turkey. The village is populated by Kurds of the Balaban tribe and had a population of 58 in 2021.

The hamlet of Koruk is attached to the village.
