= Soylu, Hani =

Village in Turkey

Soylu
- Neighbourhood
- Location in Turkey
- Coordinates: 38.3046°N 40.4323°E
- Country: Turkey
- Province: Diyarbakır
- District: Hani
- Population (2022): 212
- Time zone: UTC+3 (TRT)

Soylu (Kurdish: Zingilhênî) is a neighbourhood in the municipality and district of Hani, Diyarbakır Province in Turkey. It is populated by Kurds and had a population of 212 in 2022.
