= Göller, Üzümlü =

Village in Erzincan Province, Turkey

Göller
- Village
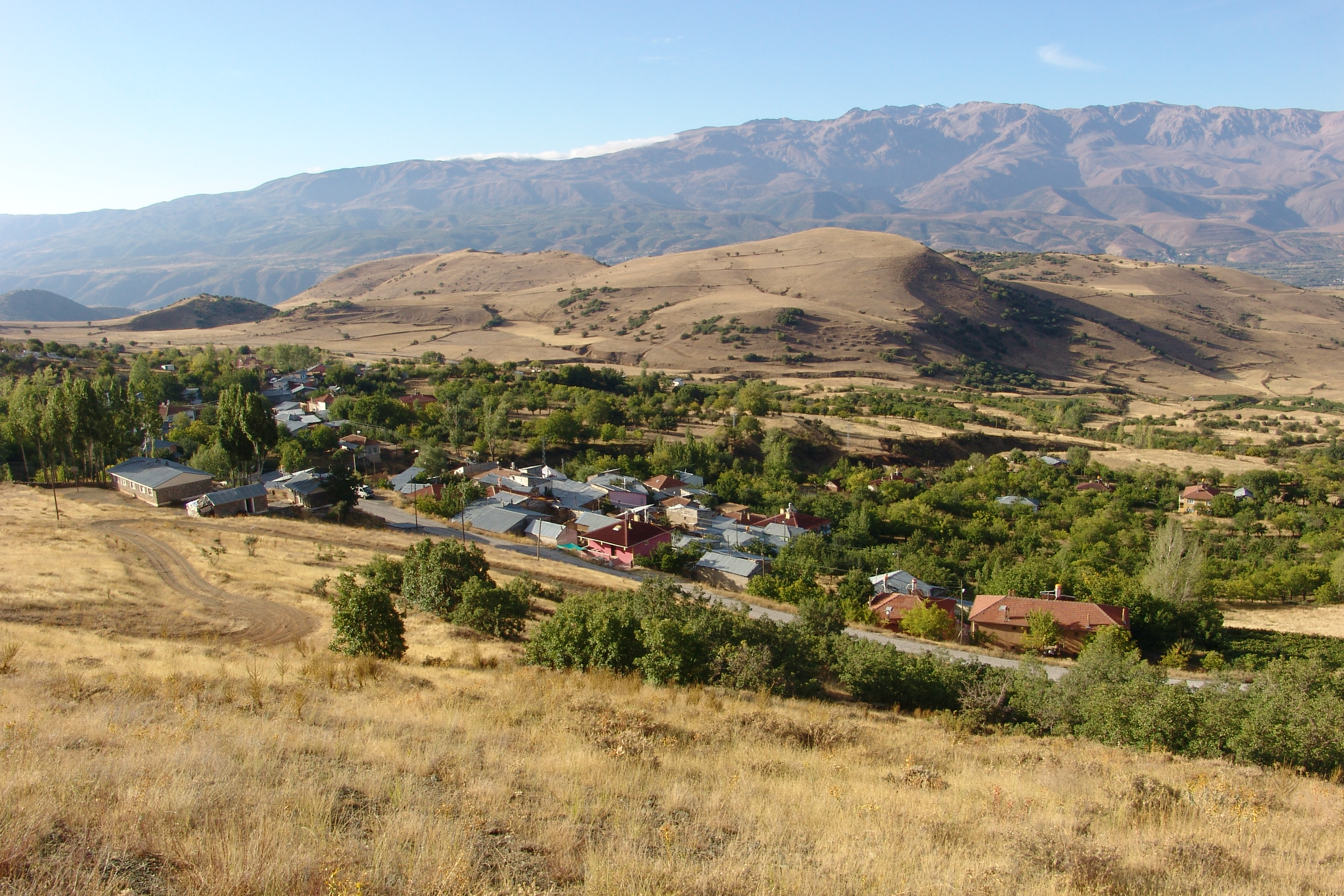

- Location within Turkey
- Coordinates: 39.668°N 39.783°E
- Country: Turkey
- Province: Erzincan
- District: Üzümlü
- Population (2021): 98
- Time zone: UTC+3 (TRT)

Göller is a village in the Üzümlü District, Erzincan Province, Turkey. The village is populated by Kurds of the Bamasur, Botikan and Kurêşan tribes and had a population of 98 in 2021.
