= Otluk, Üzümlü =

Village in Erzincan Province, Turkey

Otluk
- Village
- Location within Turkey
- Coordinates: 39.638°N 39.912°E
- Country: Turkey
- Province: Erzincan
- District: Üzümlü
- Population (2021): 13
- Time zone: UTC+3 (TRT)

Otluk (Kurdish: Badran) is a village in the Üzümlü District, Erzincan Province, Turkey. The village had a population of 13 in 2021.
