= Pelitli, Üzümlü =

Village in Erzincan Province, Turkey

Pelitli
- Village
- Location within Turkey
- Coordinates: 39.592°N 39.998°E
- Country: Turkey
- Province: Erzincan
- District: Üzümlü
- Population (2021): 50
- Time zone: UTC+3 (TRT)

Pelitli (Kurdish: Sulumur) is a village in the Üzümlü District, Erzincan Province, Turkey. The village is populated by Kurds and had a population of 50 in 2021.

The hamlets of Baykan, Canbey, Değirmendere, Geçit, Gelincik, Kayacık, Konaklar, Kuzulu, Mezraa, Taşlık and Yıldız are attached to the village.
