= Demirpınar, Üzümlü =

Village in Erzincan Province, Turkey

Demirpınar
- Village
- Location in Turkey
- Coordinates: 39°37′43″N 39°47′31″E
- Country: Turkey
- Province: Erzincan
- District: Üzümlü
- Population (2021): 92
- Time zone: UTC+3 (TRT)

Demirpınar (Kurdish: Surperen) is a village in the Üzümlü District, Erzincan Province, Turkey. The village is populated by Kurds of the Lolan tribe and had a population of 92 in 2021.
