= Büyükköy, Üzümlü =

Village in Erzincan Province, Turkey

Büyükköy
- Village
- Location within Turkey
- Coordinates: 39.645°N 40.004°E
- Country: Turkey
- Province: Erzincan
- District: Üzümlü
- Population (2021): 32
- Time zone: UTC+3 (TRT)

Büyükköy (Kurdish: Dalav) is a village in the Üzümlü District, Erzincan Province, Turkey. The village is populated by Kurds of the Hormek tribe and had a population of 32 in 2021.

The hamlets of Aşağıkom and Yukarıkom are attached to the village.
