= Altıntepe =

Iron Age fortress in Turkey

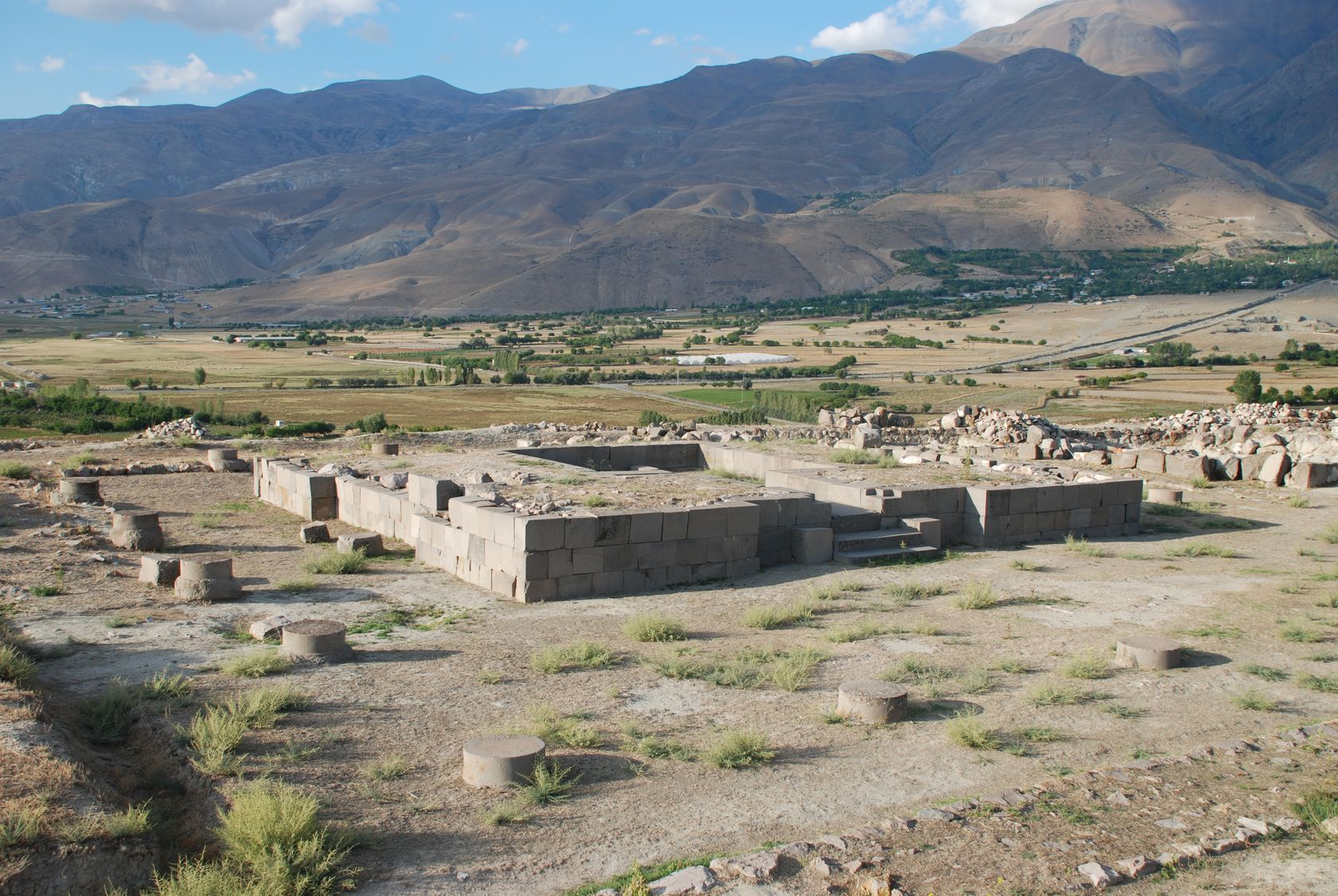
- Temple in Altıntepe

- Location within Turkey
- 39°41′47″N 39°38′48″E
- Type: Settlement
- Location: Turkey
- Region: Erzincan Province

Site notes
- Condition: In ruins

Altıntepe (Turkish for "golden hill") or Yerez (Armenian: Երեզ) is an Urartian fortress and temple archaeological site dating from the 9th to 7th century BCE. It is located on a small hill overlooking the Euphrates River in the Üzümlü district of Erzincan Province, Turkey.

Altıntepe is located at the 12th kilometre on the highway from Erzincan to Erzurum. The site was discovered in 1938 during the construction of a nearby railway line. The remains are situated on a volcanic hill 60 m high. During excavations undertaken between 1959 and 1968 and led by Professor Dr. Tahsin Özgüç, a fortified settlement from the Urartian period was found. In the excavated area a temple or palace, a great hall, a warehouse, city walls, various rooms, and three subterranean chamber tombs on the south side of the hill were found. After a long gap, excavations were restarted in 2003 by the decision of the Council of Ministers, under the leadership of Professor Dr. Mehmet Karaosmanoğlu.

The hill was a significant center for the Byzantine Empire and has a church with three naves and mosaic floors. The church was built on a natural terrace and has a rectangular floor plan. The colorful mosaic floors with various geometric shapes and figures of plants and animals are unique to the region.
