= Christian Goller =

German painter

Christian Goller (18 January 1943 – 13 November 2017) was a German painter and trained art restorer who was under investigation by German authorities regarding a number of paintings attributed to Lucas Cranach the Elder. Goller participated in art restoration courses at the Stuttgart Art Academy. He also restored church altarpieces.

In 1974 a work by Goller was sold to the Cleveland Museum of Art for $1 million. It was purchased by the museum as a painting of St Catherine by Matthias Grünewald. The painting was on a panel that contained a crack, woodworm holes and evidence of repairs, all of which it appears had been added to give the painting an antique appearance. After an art historian questioned the painting's authenticity, the museum engaged conservator Hubert von Sonnenburg to examine it. His analysis of pigments from the painting showed the presence of processed chalk and the absence of silver traces in the lead paint, both indicating that the materials used were modern. Because the painting had passed through the hands of several intermediaries before being sold to the museum, Goller was not prosecuted. He claimed that he had sold the painting under his own name and that the attribution had been the work of one of the intermediate owners.

Michael Hofbauer, a German art historian who specialises in the works of Cranach the Elder, has alleged that Goller produced up to 55 fake Cranachs. Hofbauer says that a portrait of the emperor Charles V, described and attributed by Christie's Amsterdam saleroom as "Circle of Lucas Cranach II (Wittenberg 1515-1586 Weimar) Portrait of Charles V oil on panel, transferred onto canvas laid down on panel 54.9 x 49.5 cm.", was in fact painted by Goller; the painting was withdrawn from the 25 November 2014 sale. Accompanying the painting was a copy of a certificate by Alfred Stange, a German art historian who had apparently examined the painting in the 1950s in Munich.

Hofbauer has stated that he attributes to Goller more than 60 paintings presently attributed to various artists, including Cranach, adding that the paintings have certain common features: they are painted on soft gauze or similar, on a base of gesso, which is then affixed to a wooden panel; the palette is limited to a few dull colours; and an analysis of the chemical composition of the pigments in these paintings, such as white lead, shows that the pigments used in the paintings are typical of those that would have been used in the 16th century. However, the hands of the figures are not characteristic of Cranach, and the craquelure evident in the paintings is not the result of aging but has been artificially produced. In addition, Hofbauer says he has in his possession correspondence from Dieter Koepplin of Basel, an expert in the paintings of the Cranachs, stating that Goller had produced forgeries though he did not know the specific paintings.

The District Court of Passau and the Baden-Württemberg State Office of Criminal Investigation began an investigation into Goller's activities.
