= Bağlar, Üzümlü =

Village in Erzincan Province, Turkey

Bağlar
- Village
- Location within Turkey
- Coordinates: 39.569°N 40.109°E
- Country: Turkey
- Province: Erzincan
- District: Üzümlü
- Population (2021): 82
- Time zone: UTC+3 (TRT)

Bağlar is a village in the Üzümlü District, Erzincan Province, Turkey. The village is populated by Kurds and had a population of 82 in 2021.

The hamlets of Demirkapı, Erdem, Esen, Kamer, Mehmetağa, Mustafaçavuş, Salim, Taşpınar, Terzi and Uyanık are attached to the village.
