= Erebuni Museum =

Coordinates: 40°08′28″N 44°32′07″E

Erebuni Historical-Archaeological Reserve-Museum
- «Էրեբունի» պատմահնագիտական արգելոց-թանգարան
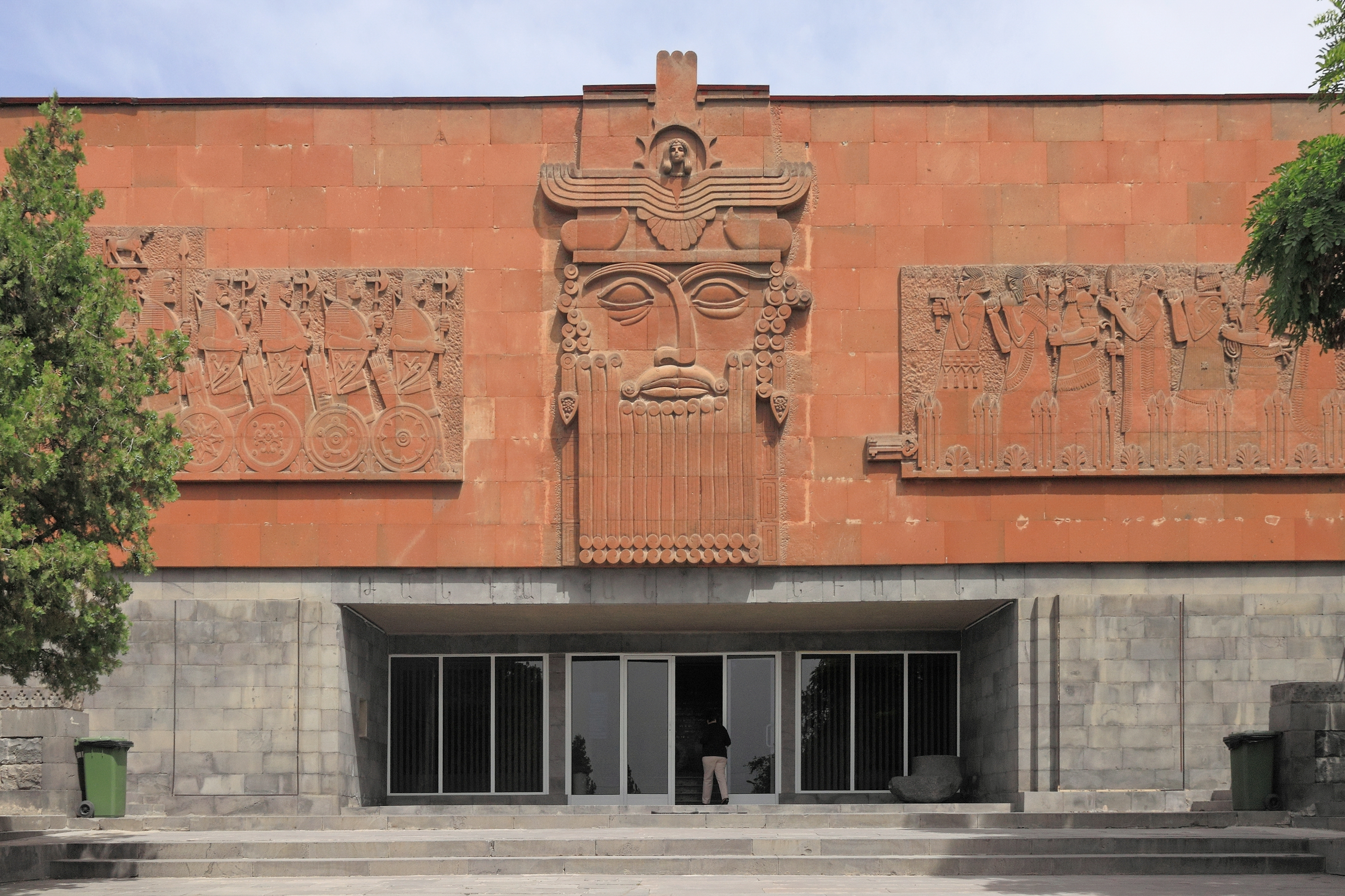
- Established: October 19, 1968
- Location: Yerevan, Armenia
- Type: history museum archeological museum
- Collection size: 12,235
- Visitors: 37,500 (2022)
- Website: erebuni.am

Erebuni Historical-Archaeological Reserve-Museum (Armenian: «Էրեբունի» պատմահնագիտական արգելոց-թանգարան), was established on October 19, 1968. The opening of the museum was timed to coincide with the 2750th anniversary of Yerevan. The Museum stands at the foot of the Arin Berd hill, on top of which the Urartian Fortress Erebouni has stood since 782 BCE. The city-fortress was excavated, some parts of the structure were reinforced and restored, and the fortress was turned into an outdoor museum.

A cuneiform inscription testifies that the city was built by Argishti I the King of Urartu in 782 BCE. The majority of the fortress was built from raw bricks. The citadel was encircled by strong walls in some places built in three rows. The temple of God Khaldi occupied an important place in the fortress. The walls of the temple were decorated with numerous frescos. Archeologists have found giant karasses (pitches for storage of wine) buried in the ground. Ceramics, potter's wheels and other articles used in everyday life were also unearthed during excavations. There is huge collection of artifacts, sups, jars, bronze bracelets, glass, agate beads and many other things that tell us about the life of the citadel, the tastes and habits of its inhabitants. The building of the Museum that houses 12,235 exhibits was constructed by architects Baghdasar Arzoumanian and Shmavon Azatian and sculptor A. Harutiunian. It has two branches in Shengavit and Karmir Blur with 5,288 and 1,620 exhibits respectively in stock. The sculptural design of the museum is the history of the ancient state of Urartu, represented by plastic means of expression. For sculpture of Erebuni Museum in 1970 Ara Harutyunyan was awarded a diploma of the USSR Union of Architects for the sculptures on the museum building.

In addition to the permanent exhibition, the Erebuni Historical-Archaeological Reserve-Museum regularly presents exhibitions aimed at public recognition of the museum collection, and coverage of the latest results of archeological excavations in Erebuni, Karmir Blur, Shengavit, as well as individual topics.

Miqayel Badalyan has been the director of the museum since 2018.

== Gallery ==
Erebuni Museum

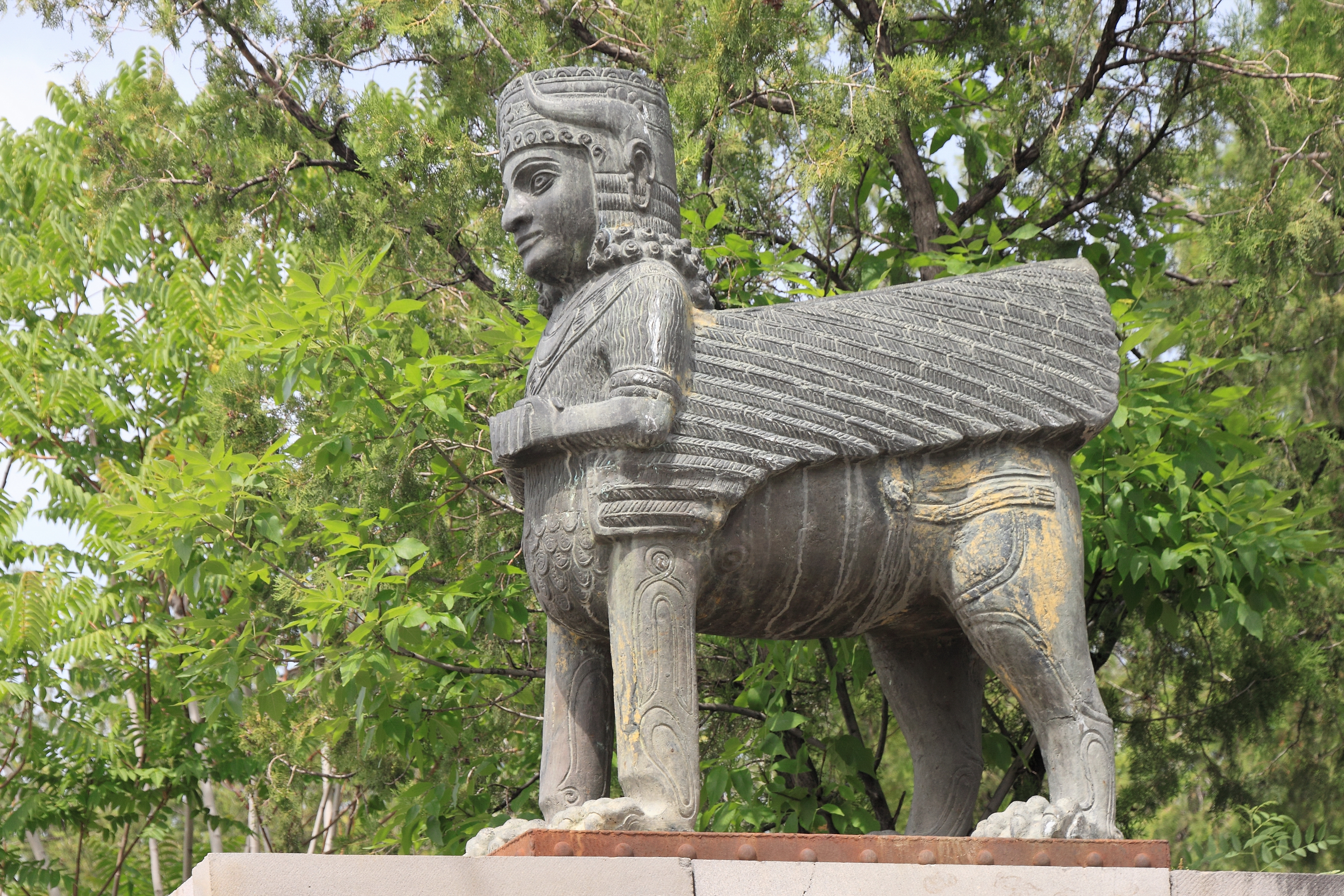

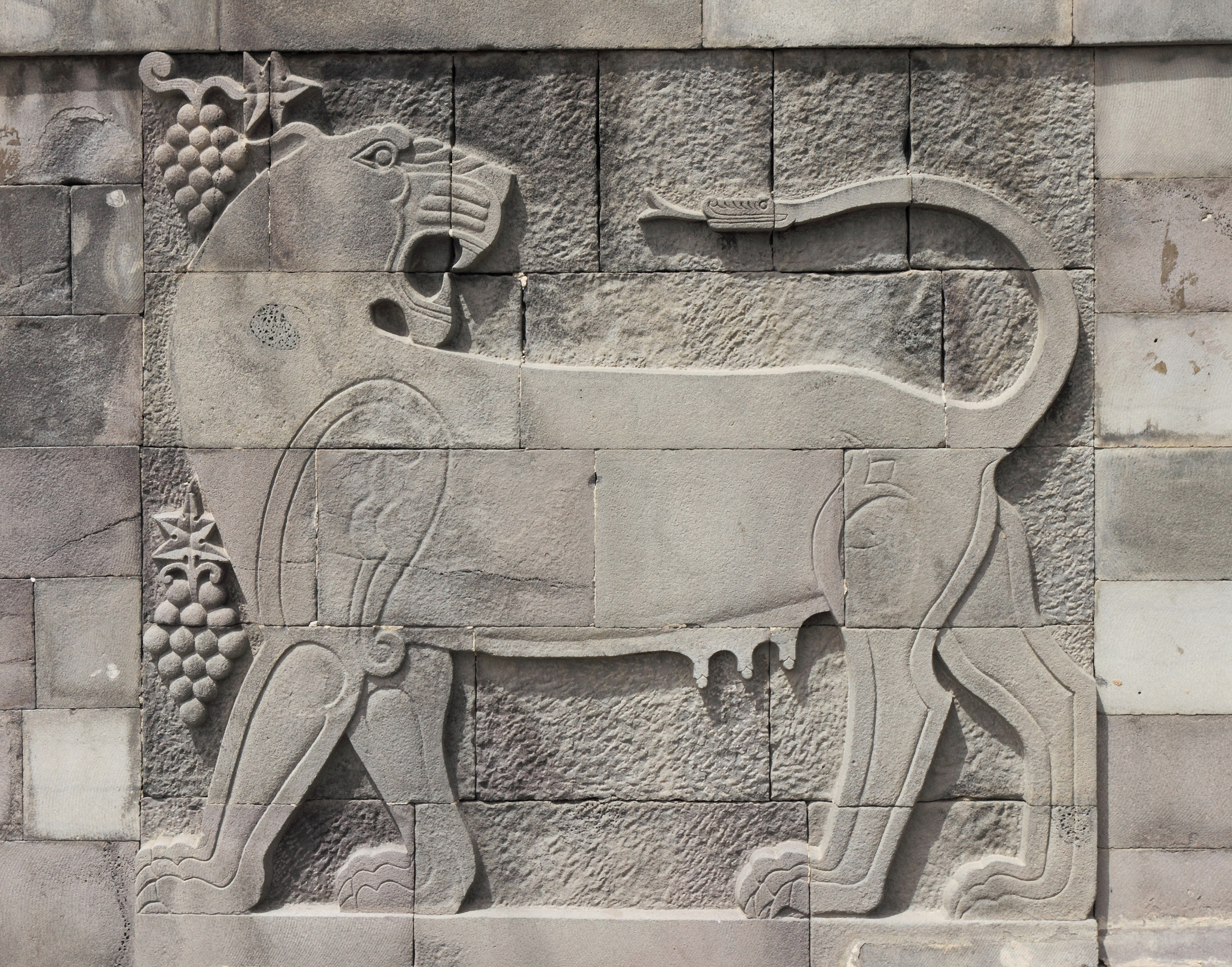

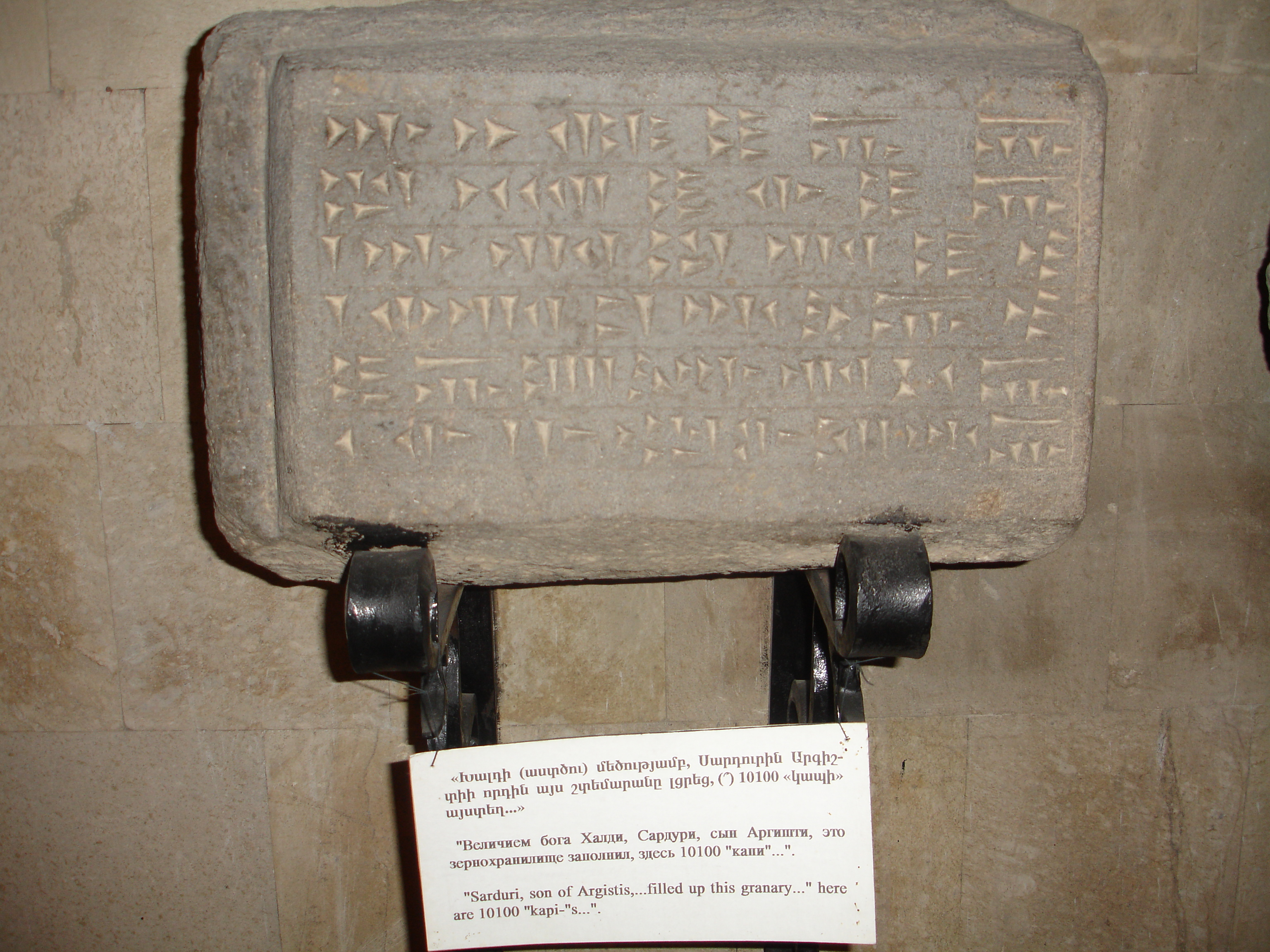

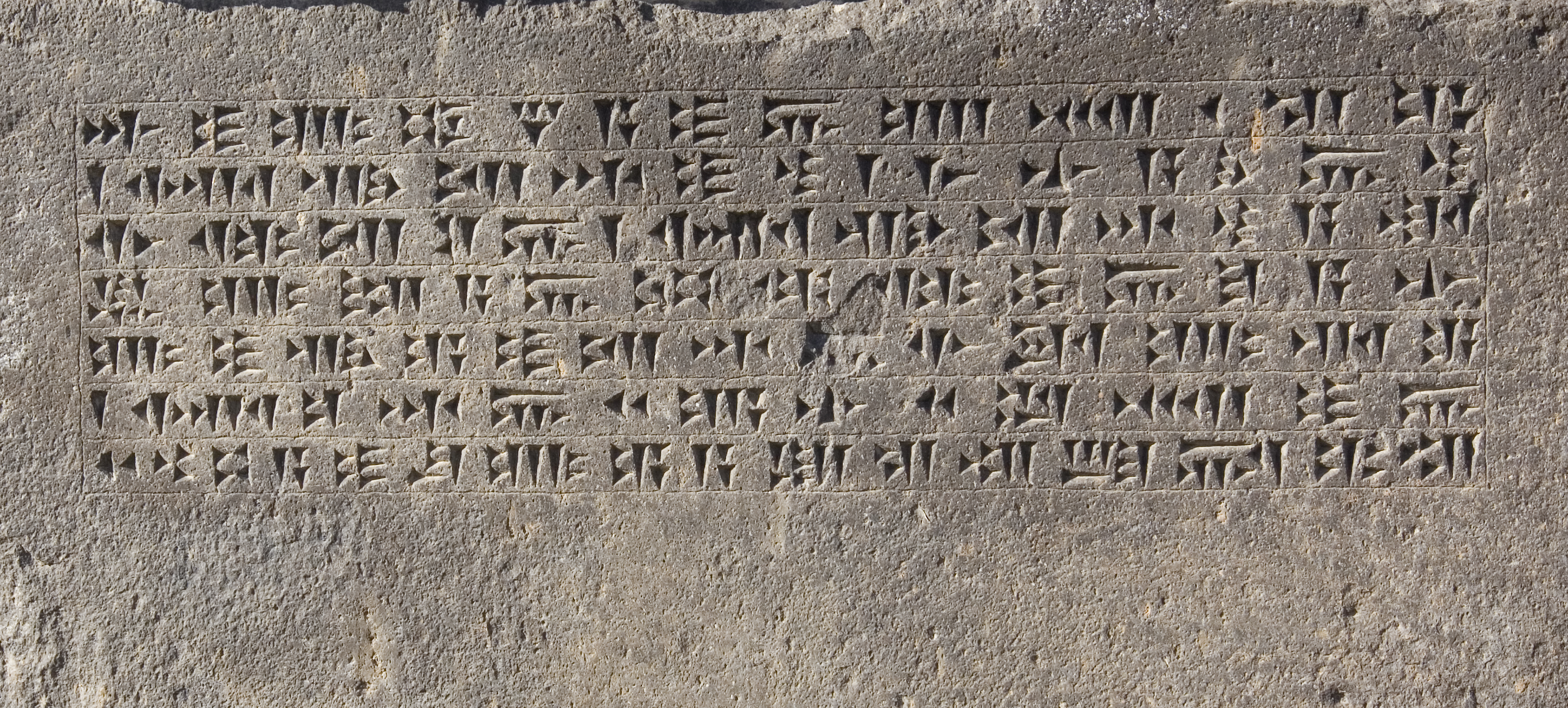

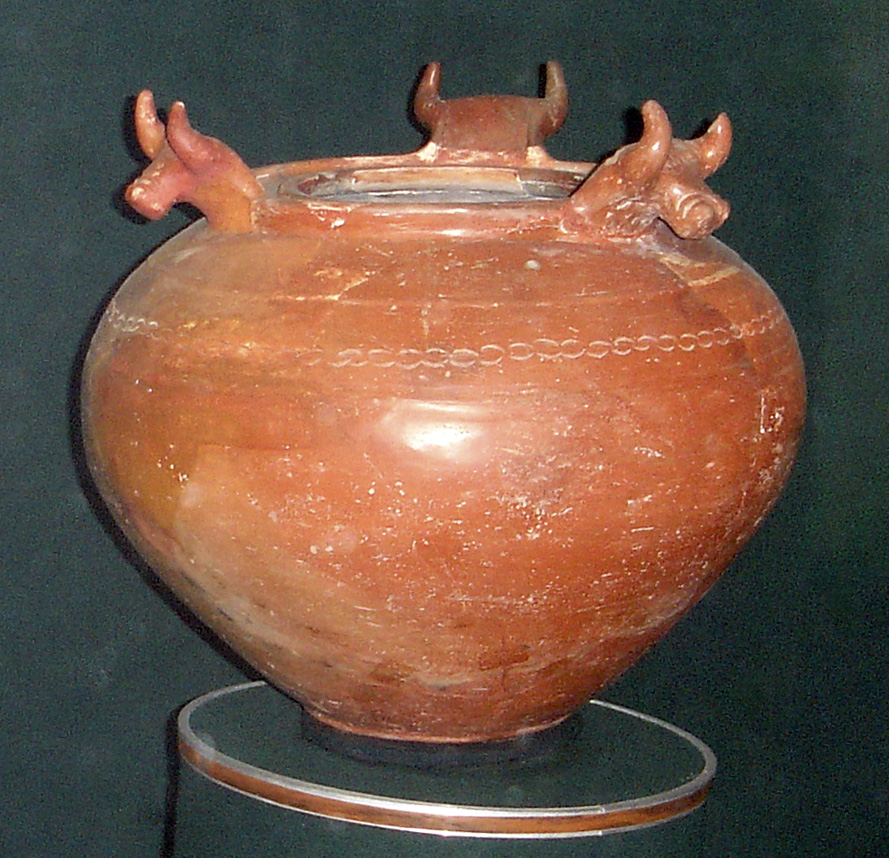

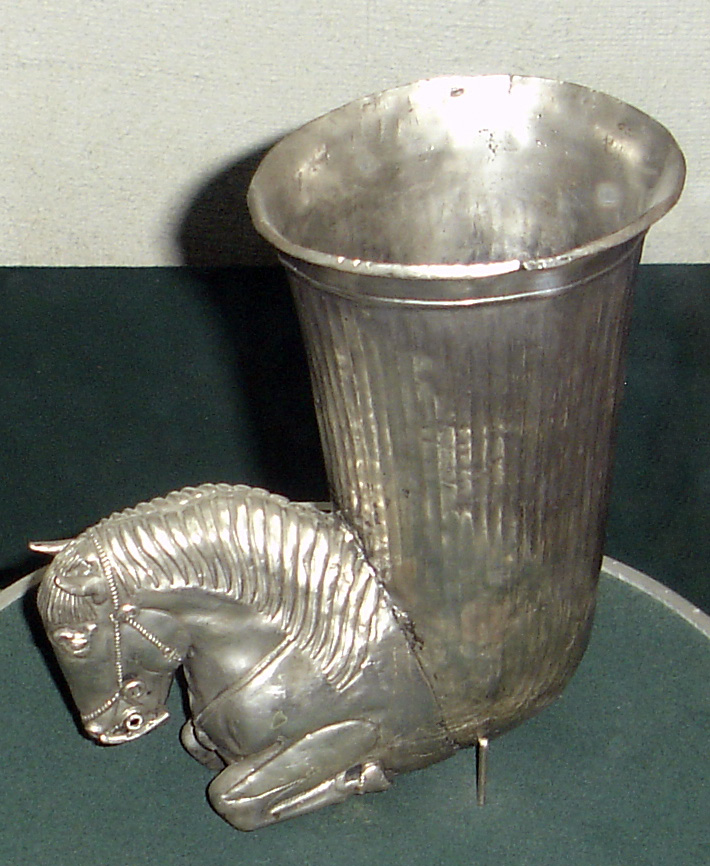

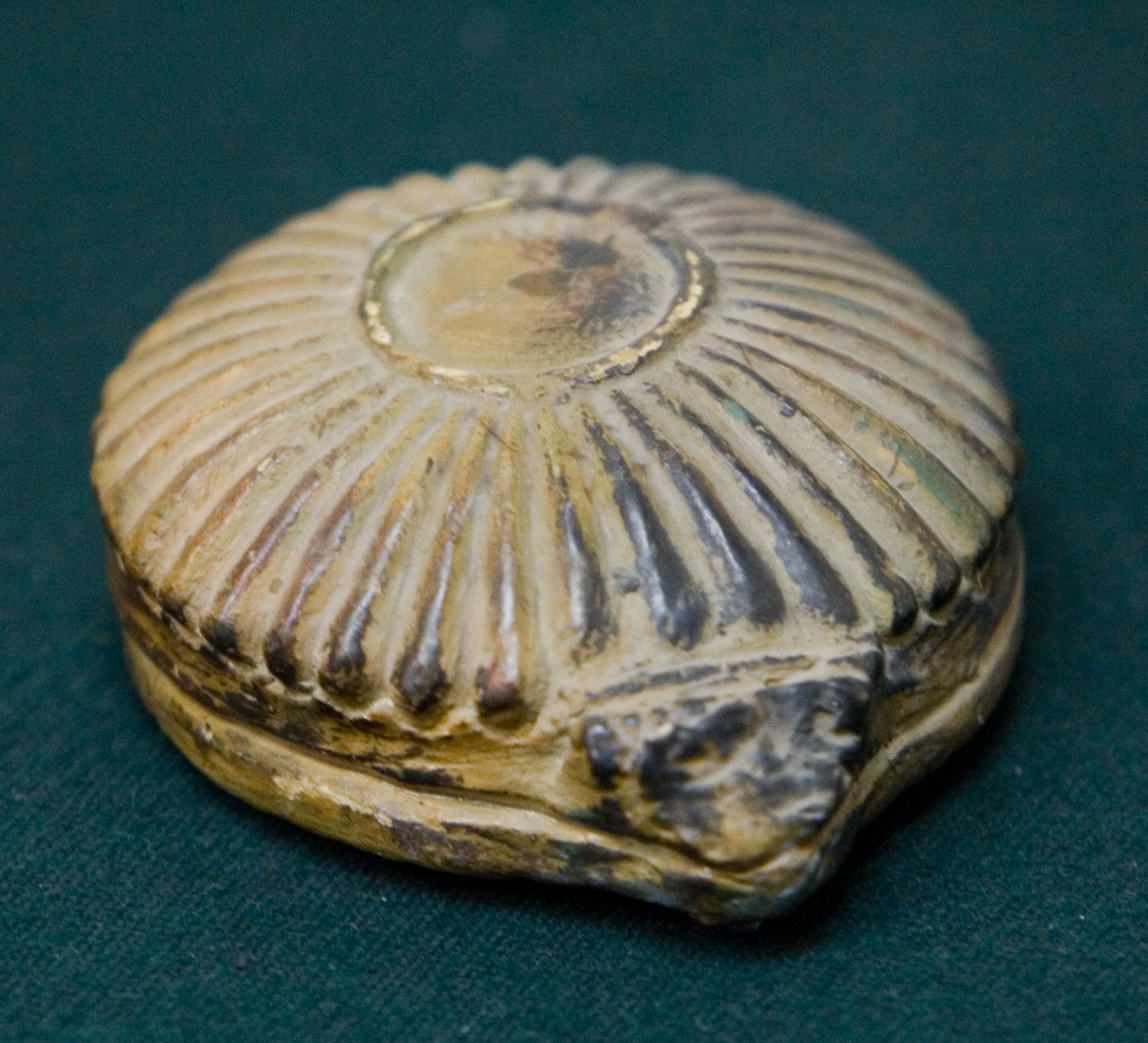

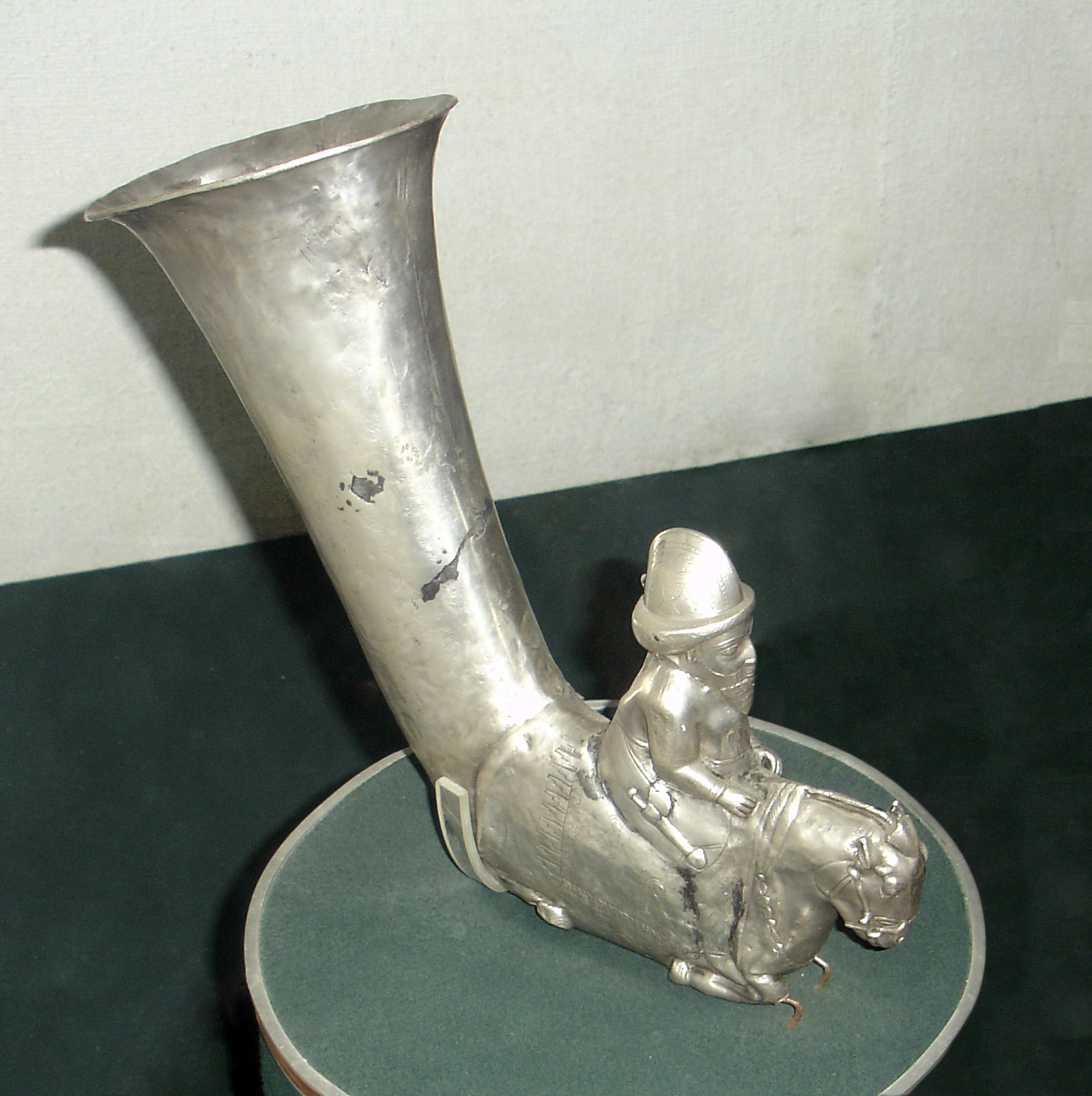

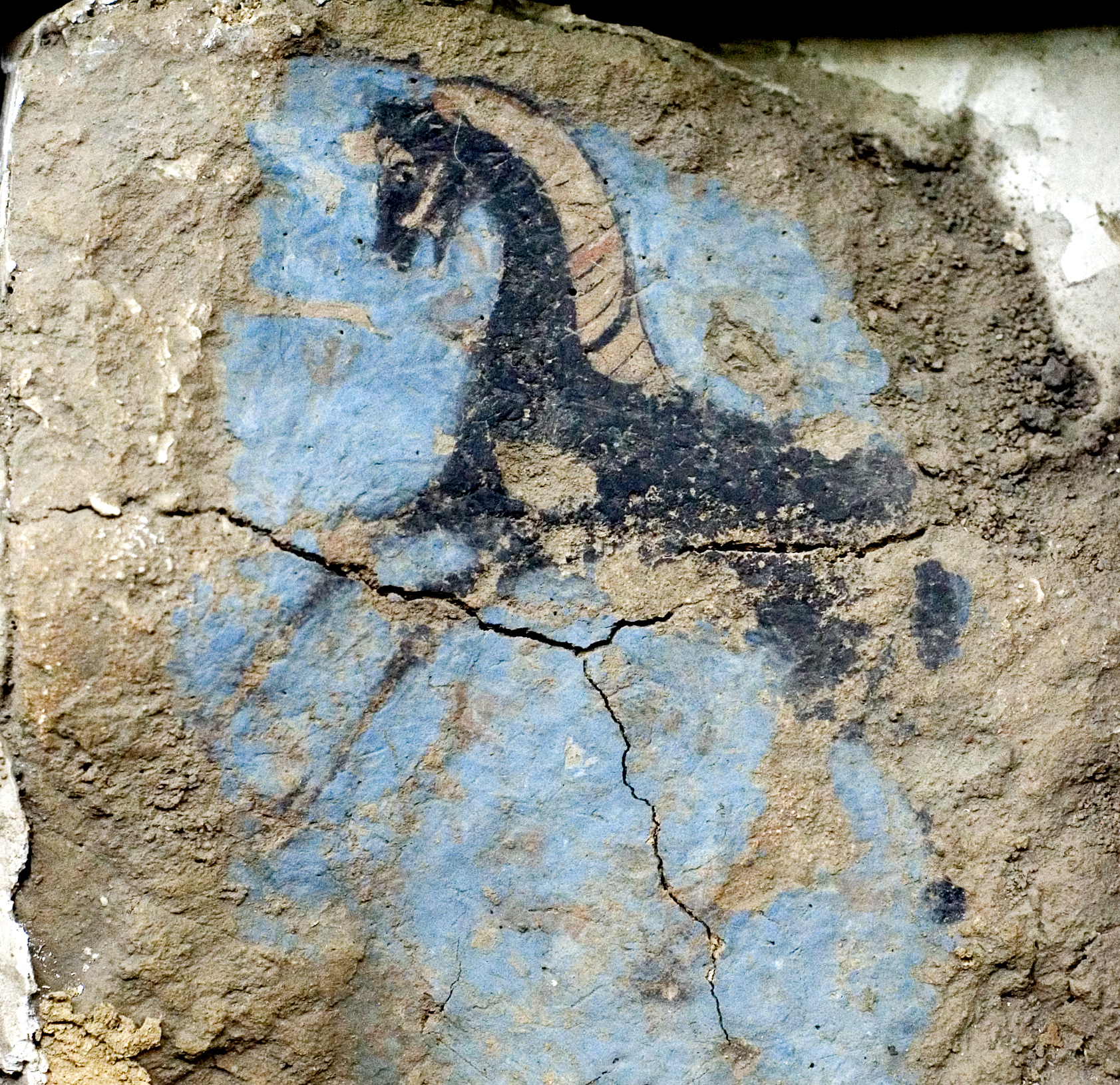

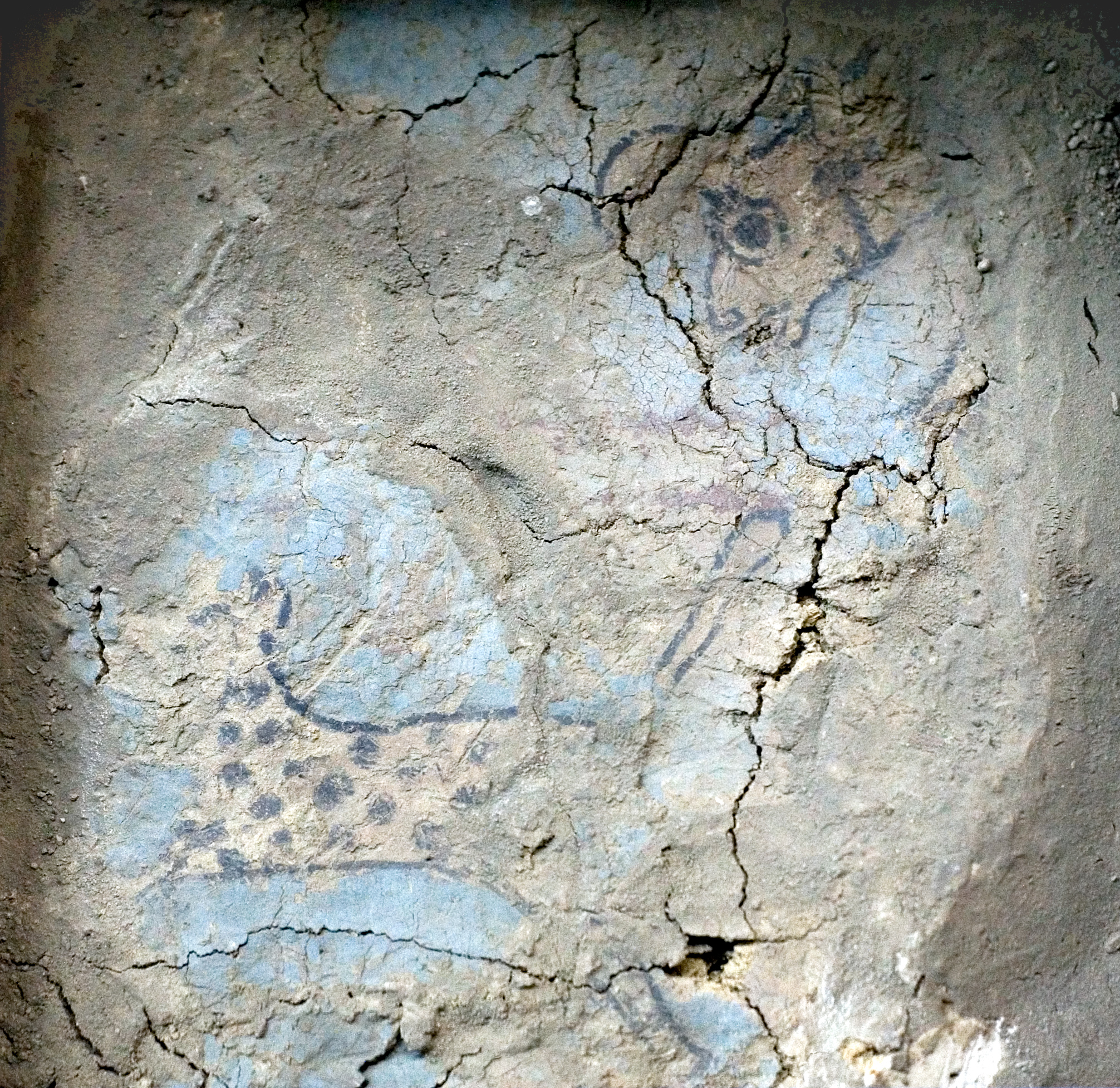
