= Balabanlı, Üzümlü =

Village in Erzincan Province, Turkey

Balabanlı
- Village
- Location within Turkey
- Coordinates: 39.611°N 39.862°E
- Country: Turkey
- Province: Erzincan
- District: Üzümlü
- Population (2021): 24
- Time zone: UTC+3 (TRT)

Balabanlı (also known as Balabanlı Sarıkaya, Kurdish: Balaban) is a village in the Üzümlü District, Erzincan Province, Turkey. The village is populated by Kurds of the Balaban and Lolan tribes and had a population of 24 in 2021.

The hamlets of Çaykomu, Devriş and Kaban are attached to the village.
