= Çardaklı, Üzümlü =

Village in Erzincan Province, Turkey

Çardaklı
- Village
- Location within Turkey
- Coordinates: 39.658°N 39.807°E
- Country: Turkey
- Province: Erzincan
- District: Üzümlü
- Population (2021): 95
- Time zone: UTC+3 (TRT)

Çardaklı (Kurdish: Abge) is a village in the Üzümlü District, Erzincan Province, Turkey. The village is populated by Kurds of the Bamasur, Kurêşan and Lolan tribes and had a population of 95 in 2021.

The hamlets of Akınca, Çanaklı, Dermeli, Dikili, Düzali, İkizler, Murat and Topluca are attached to the village.
