= Brauerei Göller =

German brewery

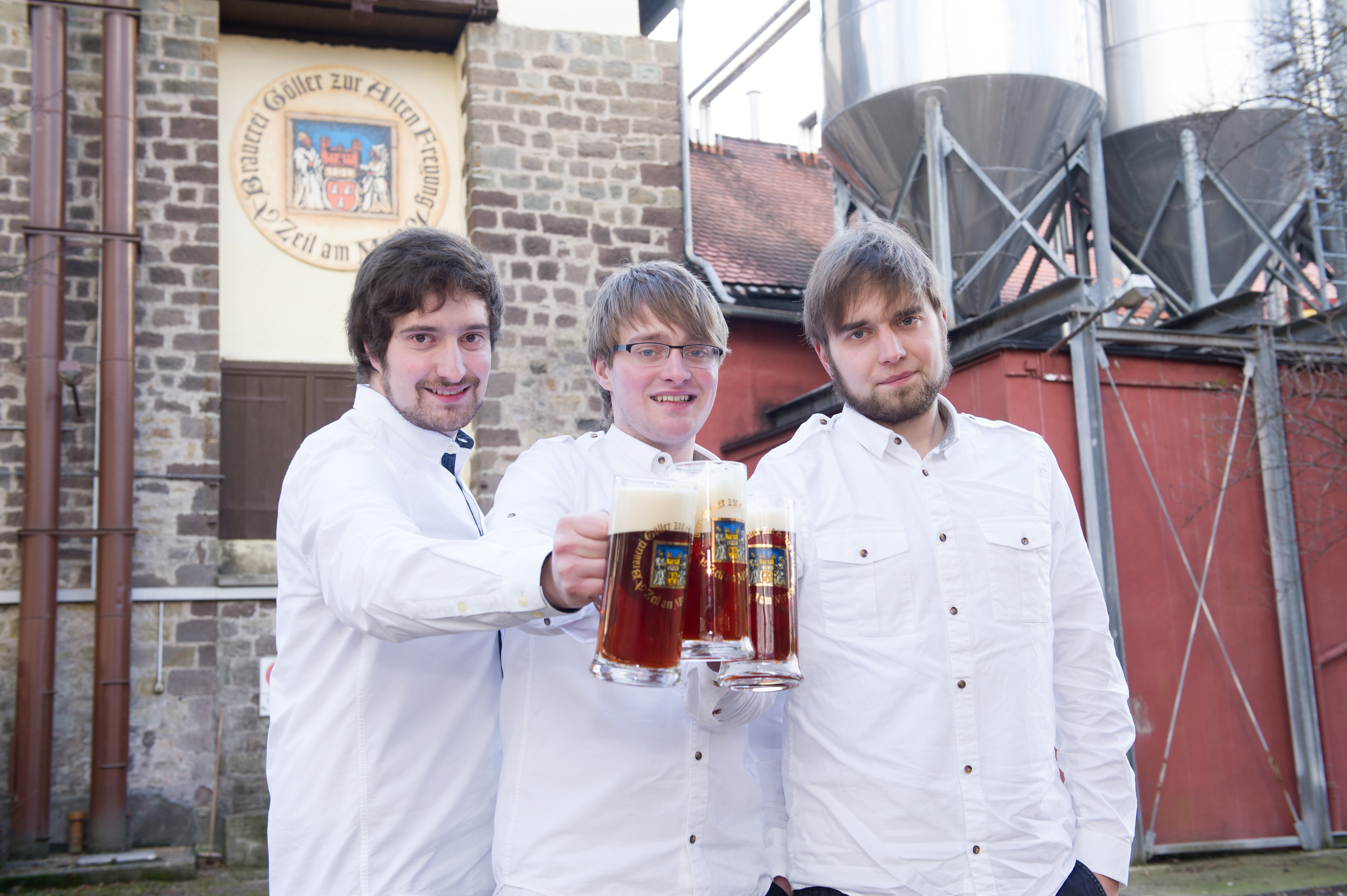
- Type: Craft brewery
- Location: Zeil am Main, Lower Franconia, Bavaria, Germany
- Coordinates: 50.015355°N 10.580972°E
- Opened: 1514; 511 years ago
- Key people: Felix Göller (Brewmaster)
- Annual production volume: 45,000 hL
- Website: brauerei-goeller.de

Brauerei Göller, more commonly known as Göller, is one of the oldest craft breweries in the world. Located in the village of Zeil am Main in Franconia, Germany, Göller is a multi-generational family enterprise tracing its roots to 1514 when a local sanctuary or "Freyung" secured a brewing license. Three brothers, Fritz, Max & Felix Göller run the brewery. Current brewmaster, Felix Göller, was named German Brewer of the year in 2013. His father, Franz-Josef Göller, won the same award in 1976. Göller has won multiple gold medals in Meininger's International Craft Beer Awards, especially for its Rauchbier and its Dunkel. The Euro Beer Star was also awarded several times. Göller recently entered the international market and currently exports to the USA through Ancient Craft Imports, based in Kansas.
