= Eruandunik =

Hayots Dzor (Armenian: Հայոց Ձոր, literally "the valley of the Armenians") or Eruandunik/Yervandunik (Armenian: Երուանդունիք, from the name of the Orontid dynasty) was a canton (gavar) of the province of Vaspurakan of historical Armenia encompassing the area to the southeast of Lake Van, namely the valley of the Khoshab (Hoşap River). It was bordered by the cantons of Rshtunik to the southwest, Tosp to the north, and Kughanovit to the east. Armenian folk tradition holds the region to be the site of the legendary battle between the Armenian patriarch Hayk and the Babylonian ruler Bel. Hayk is said to have founded the fortress of Haykʻ or Haykaberd (traditionally identified with the ruins of the Urartian fortress of Sardurihinili) at the site of the battle, in honor of which Hayots Dzor was named.

The inhabitants of region irrigated their fields using the Khoshab River and the Shamiram Canal, which was built during the time of the Kingdom of Urartu. Hayots Dzor was populated almost entirely by Armenians until the 1890s, when Kurdish tribes began to settle in the area following the Hamidian massacres. As of 1911, there were 12 monasteries in the region of Hayots Dzor, five of which were standing and seven of which were in ruins. Around 10,000 Armenians lived in Hayots Dzor before the Armenian genocide, when the Armenian villages were destroyed and their inhabitants massacred or deported.

== Villages ==
According to Manvel Mirakhorian, who traveled to the region in the late nineteenth century, the Armenian-populated villages of Hayots Dzor were as follows (modern-day Turkish names and district in parentheses):

- Agrak
- Atʻanantsʻ (Atalan, Gevaş)
- Anggh (Dönemeç, Edremit)
- Ankshtantsʻ (Parmakkapi, Gürpınar)
- Aṛegh (Bozyiğit, Gürpınar)
- Astvatsashen (Çavuştepe, Gürpınar)
- Aradentsʻ (Çakinli, Gürpınar)
- Berdak (Doğanlar, Edremit)
- Zernak
- Trkʻashen (Uğurveren, Gevaş)
- Ishkhani Gom (Bakimli, Edremit)
- Kaṛnurd (Değirmendüzü, Gürpınar)
- Khachʻ
- Kharakantsʻ (Engisu, Edremit)
- Khekʻ (Yatağan, Gürpınar)
- Khndrakatar
- Khosp (Sakalar, Gürpınar)
- Khorgom (Dilkaya, Edremit)
- Kalbalasan (Arkboyu, Gürpınar)
- Karmrakʻar
- Kem (Köprüler, Edremit)
- Kendanantsʻ
- Kězěldash (Kiziltaş, Gevaş)
- Kghzi (Gürpınar)
- Hermeru
- Hilunkʻ
- Hirch (Gündoğan, Gevaş)
- Hndstan (Erkaldi, Gürpınar)
- Mashkatak (Gölbaşı, Edremit)
- Margs (Andaç, Edremit)
- Mulkʻ (Mülk, Edremit)
- Nanik
- Norgyugh (Yolaşan, Gürpınar)
- Vochkharantsʻ Verin, Vochkhrantsʻ Nerkʻin (Koyunyataği, Gürpınar)
- Pahantsʻ
- Pzhnkert Verin, Pzhnkert Nerkʻin
- Pltentsʻ (Aladüz, Gevaş)
- Spitak Vankʻ
- Surb Vardan (Kiyicak, Edremit)
- Vahrantsʻ, Toni (Gölardı, Gürpınar)
- Urtʻuk
- Pʻakakatuk (Bölmeçalı, Gürpınar)
- Kʻaravantsʻ (Çayırbaşı, Edremit)
- Kʻerts (Abali, Gevaş)
- Kʻeoshk (Köşk, Edremit and Ongün, Gürpınar)

== See also ==
- List of regions of ancient Armenia
- Armenians of Van
- Gürpınar, Van
