= Edremit, Van =

Edremit
- District and municipality
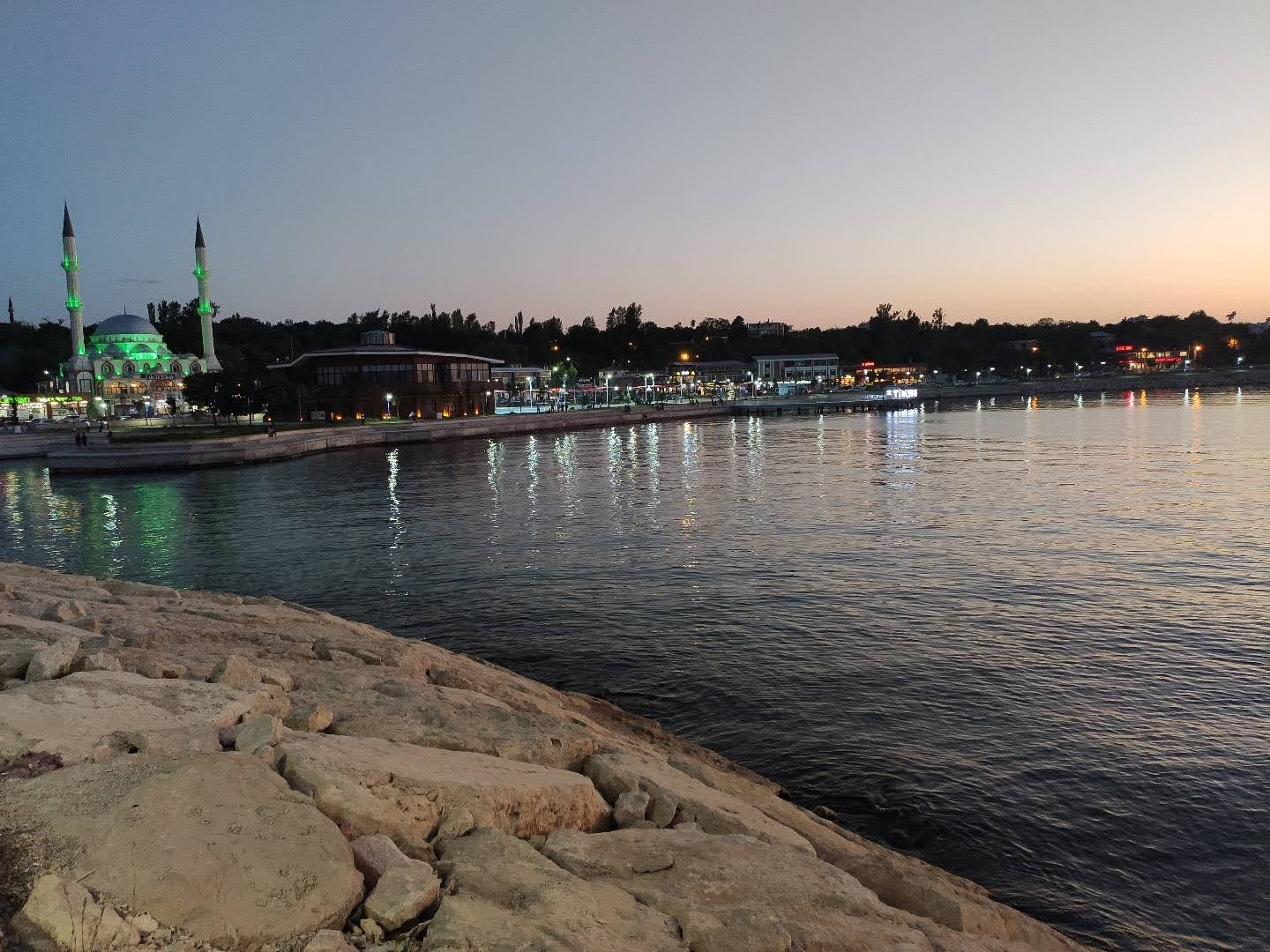
- View of Edremit beach

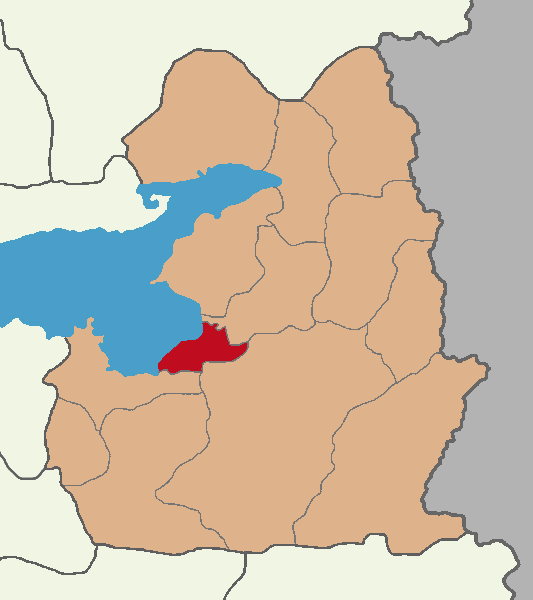
- Map showing Edremit District in Van Province

- Location within Turkey
- Coordinates: 38°25′27″N 43°15′22″E
- Country: Turkey
- Province: Van

Government
  - Mayor: İsmail Say (AKP)
- Area: 515 km^{2} (199 sq mi)
- Population (2022): 127,819
  - Density: 248/km^{2} (643/sq mi)
- Time zone: UTC+3 (TRT)
- Area code: 0432
- Website: www.vanedremit.bel.tr

Edremit (Kurdish: Artemêt; Armenian: Արտամէտ, romanized: Artamet) is a municipality and district of Van Province, Turkey. Its area is 515 km^{2}, and its population is 127,819 (2022). In the 2013 reorganisation, part of the former central district of Van was attached to Edremit District. It covers the southern part of the agglomeration of Van and the adjacent countryside. The district's central town, which has the same name, is situated on the coast of Lake Van at a distance of 18 kilometres (11 mi) from the city of Van.

== Name ==
The Armenian name for Edremit is Artamet (Արտամէտ Artamet or Արտամէդ Artamed), which is traditionally associated with the name of the Greek goddess Artemis, who is identified with the Armenian goddess Anahit. In pre-Christian times, a temple to Anahit existed in Artamet. In various historical sources, the settlement has also been called Artamat, Artamida or Avan (the latter means 'small town' in Armenian), while its fortress has been called Zard. Some authors identify the settlement with the site known as Artashesyan or Artavanyan Avan ('Artashes's town' or 'Artabanes's town'), although, according to Tadevos Hakobyan, this is incorrect. The medieval Armenian historian Tovma Artsruni, referring to a folk tradition, writes that Artamet means 'Artashes's entrance' or 'Artabanes's entrance', as if composed of the first part of those names and the Armenian word mutk’ 'entrance'. According to another interpretation, based on the form Artamat, the name means 'Artashes came', as if the ending is the root of the Persian word āmadan 'to come'.

According to one source, Edremit is to be identified with the settlement of Alniuni mentioned in Urartian inscriptions. Edremit has also been called Sarmansuyu in later centuries, because of the Menua Canal, popularly known as the Shamiram or Shamran canal, that runs through the town. The form Edremit appears as early as the 17th century, in the work of the Ottoman traveler Evliya Çelebi.

== History ==
The site of the town of Artamet has been settled since ancient times. In the time of the Urartian Kingdom, the Menua Canal was built through the modern-day Edremit district and passes through the town itself. Many of the Urartian inscriptions which mark the canal are located in the Edremit district. The canal continued to irrigate the fertile gardens of the district into the 19th century. The settlement served as a summer residence for the Armenian kings of antiquity. Within the Kingdom of Armenia, Artamet was located in the Tosp district (according to other sources, Hayots Dzor district) of the Vaspurakan province. The medieval Armenian historian Tovma Artsruni claims that Artamet was founded by the 2nd-century BC Armenian king Artaxias I (Artashes) for his queen Satenik. Artamet was the site of a temple to the goddess Anahit; after the Christianization of Armenia, the temple was turned into a church. Until the end of the 8th century, Artamet was one of the possessions of the Armenian noble house of Rshtuni. Afterwards, it was owned by the Artsruni dynasty. Artamet grew significantly under the Artsruni-ruled Kingdom of Vaspurakan, growing into a city; Tadevos Hakobyan estimates its population at that time at over 10,000.

Prior to World War I, Edremit was still sometimes called a city or rural town, but it was, at that point, a relatively small settlement. Little remained of the old town, as new houses were built using the building materials of the older structures. In the first half of the 19th century, it was inhabited by 500 households, of which 400 were Armenian and the rest were Kurdish. By the beginning of the 20th century, the Kurds were more numerous than the Armenians. At that time, the settlement reportedly had a population of 400 Kurds and 200 Armenians. The Armenian inhabitants lived in the central part of the settlement, while the Kurds mainly lived in the peripheral gardening areas. The Menua Canal (alternatively, the road connecting Van and Gevaş) divided the Armenian and Kurdish parts of the settlement. During the Hamidian massacres of 1894–1896, the Armenian population was robbed. Another source gives the settlement's pre-World War I population as 720 Armenians (130 households) and 2,400 Kurds (420 households).

Most of the Armenian inhabitants of Artamet were killed during the Armenian genocide starting in 1915. Some of them took part in the Defense of Van, then followed the retreating Russian army and reached Russian Armenia. The events of Artamet in 1915 are described in the book Four Years Beneath the Crescent by Venezuelan writer and soldier Rafael de Nogales.

On 9 November 2011, a 5.9 magnitude earthquake occurred in Edremit.

== Composition ==
There are 30 neighbourhoods in Edremit District:

- Akın
- Andaç
- Ayazpınar
- Bakacık
- Bakımlı
- Çayırbaşı
- Dilkaya
- Doğanlar
- Dönemeç
- Elmalık
- Eminpaşa
- Enginsu
- Erdemkent
- Erenkent
- Esentepe
- Eskicamii
- Gölkaşı
- Kavurma
- Kıyıcak
- Köklü
- Köprüler
- Köşkköy
- Kurubaş
- Mülk
- Şabaniye
- Selahattin Eyyubi
- Süphan
- Taşkonak
- Yeni
- Yenicamii

== Government ==
Gülcan Kaçmaz Sayyiğit from the Peoples' Democratic Party (HDP) was elected mayor at the local elections in March 2019. In September 2019 five council members of the HDP were dismissed and replaced with trustees. The Kaymakam is Muhammet Fuat Türkman.

== Historical landmarks ==
Historical landmarks in Edremit city and its vicinity include the remains of an ancient fortress, several churches, monasteries and shrines, various buildings, and Urartian cuneiform inscriptions, namely those of the Menua Canal. The remains of the walls of an ancient fortress and the ruins of four later Armenian churches have been preserved in the city. The oldest of the Armenian churches was probably built in the 13th century. The Surb Astvatsatsin (Holy Mother of God) Church, facing Lake Van, was particularly prominent with its elevated position in the former Armenian part of the town. A Greek Orthodox church also existed in Edremit.

== Economy ==
Historically, one of the main economic activities of the inhabitants of Edremit was gardening. Its fruit orchards and walnut groves were irrigated by the waters of the Menua Canal, which passes through the settlement. It was especially famous for its sweet apples, which were exported to Van and other settlements by boat. The population was also engaged in agriculture and, to a lesser extent, fishing, local trade, and crafts. Since the 1970s, agriculture has become comparatively less important for the Edremit district, while services, industry and trade have developed. Today, many teahouses and restaurants exist in Edremit, which is a popular destination for residents of Van seeking to leave the city during the hot summers.

== Transportation ==
Edremit town is connected to Van to the east and Gevaş to the west by the D.300 state road. It has a landing stage for ferries to traverse Lake Van.
