= 790s BC =

Decade

This article concerns the period 799 BC – 790 BC.

== Events and trends ==
- 799 BC— According to the Vayu Purana, the Pradyota dynasty conquers Magadha, starting a rule that lasts 138 years.
- 797 BC— Thespieus, Archon of Athens, dies after a reign of 27 years and is succeeded by his son Agamestor.
- 796 BC— Adad-Nirari III captures Damascus after a siege against King Ben-Hadad III.
- c.790 BC— Adad-Nirari III conducts a raid against the Chaldeans.

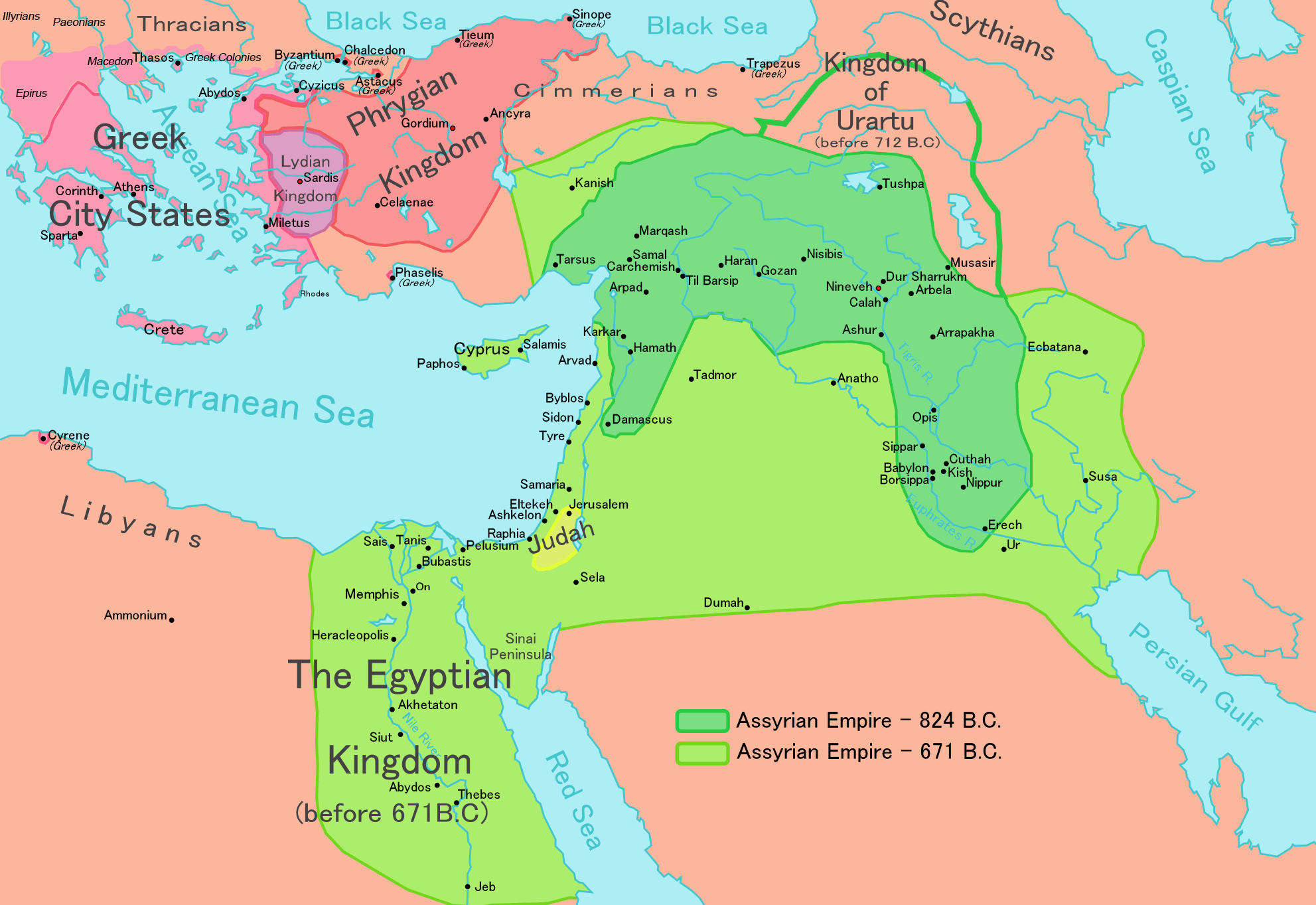
Map of the Neo-Assyrian Empire and its expansions.

== Significant people ==
- Hazael, King of Aramaean Damascus, r. 842–796 BC
- Pygmalion, Legendary King (formerly joint ruler with his sister, Dido) of Tyre, r. 831–785 BC
- Shoshenq III, Pharaoh of Egypt (Twenty-Second Dynasty), r. 837–798 BC, died in 798 BC
- Jehoash of Judah, King of Judah, r. c.836–797 BC
- Xuan, King of Zhou dynasty China, r. 827–782 BC
- Thespieus, Archon of Athens, in office 824–797 BC
- Jehoahaz, King of Israel, r. c.814–798 BC
- Dido, Legendary Queen (and founder) of Carthage, r. 814–c.760 BC
- Adad-Nirari III, King of Assyria, r. 811–783 BC
- Utupurshi, King of Diauehi, r. 810 BC–770 BC
- Menuas, King of Urartu, r. 810–785
- Caranus, King of Macedon, r. 808–778 BC
- Shoshenq VI, Pharaoh of Egypt (Twenty-Third Dynasty), r. 801–795 BC
- Agesilaus I, Archilaus (Agiad Kings, r. 820–790 BC and 790–760 BC respectively) and Eunomus (Eurypontid King r. 800–780 BC), Co-Kings of Sparta
- Lycurgus of Sparta (800 BC?–730 BC?), legendary lawgiver
- Ninurta-apla-X (full name unknown), King of Babylon, r. c.800–790 BC
- Jehoash of Israel, King of Israel, r. c.798–782 BC
- Shoshenq IV, Pharaoh of Egypt (Twenty-Second Dynasty), r. 798–785 BC
- Amaziah, King of Judah, r. c.797–768 BC
- Agamestor, Archon of Athens, in office 797–778 BC
- Ben-Hadad III, King of Aramaean Damascus, r. c.796–792 BC
- Osorkon III, Pharaoh of Egypt (Twenty-Third Dynasty), r. 795–767 BC
- Alara, King of Kush, r. 795 – c.765 BC
- Rezin, King of Aramaean Damascus, r. 792-732 BC
- Marduk-bel-zeri, King of Babylon, r. c.790–780 BC
- Homer of Chios, Legendary Greek Poet
- Jeroboam, Israelite Prince, regent, and future king

== Contemporaries of future importance ==
- Jonah of Israel, future prophet (according to Bible)
- Amos of Israel, future prophet and author of the Book of Amos (according to Bible)
