= 797 (disambiguation) =

797 may refer to:

- 797 (year)
- 797 (number)
- 797 BC
- Area code 797
- Caterpillar 797
- 797 Montana
