= Armenians of Kars =

Armenian population of Kars, Turkiye

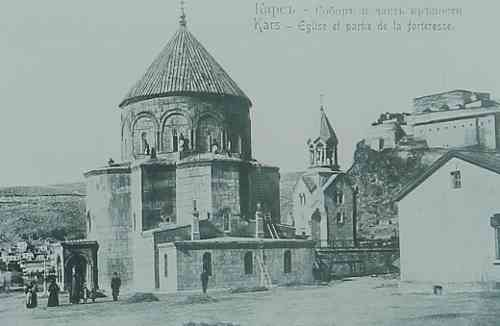
Armenian church in Kars.

Kars is a city in northeastern Turkey that was historically home to a significant Armenian population. Before the Armenian Genocide, which took place during World War I, Kars was a thriving center of Armenian culture, with a large Armenian community living alongside Turks, Kurds, and other ethnic groups.

== History ==
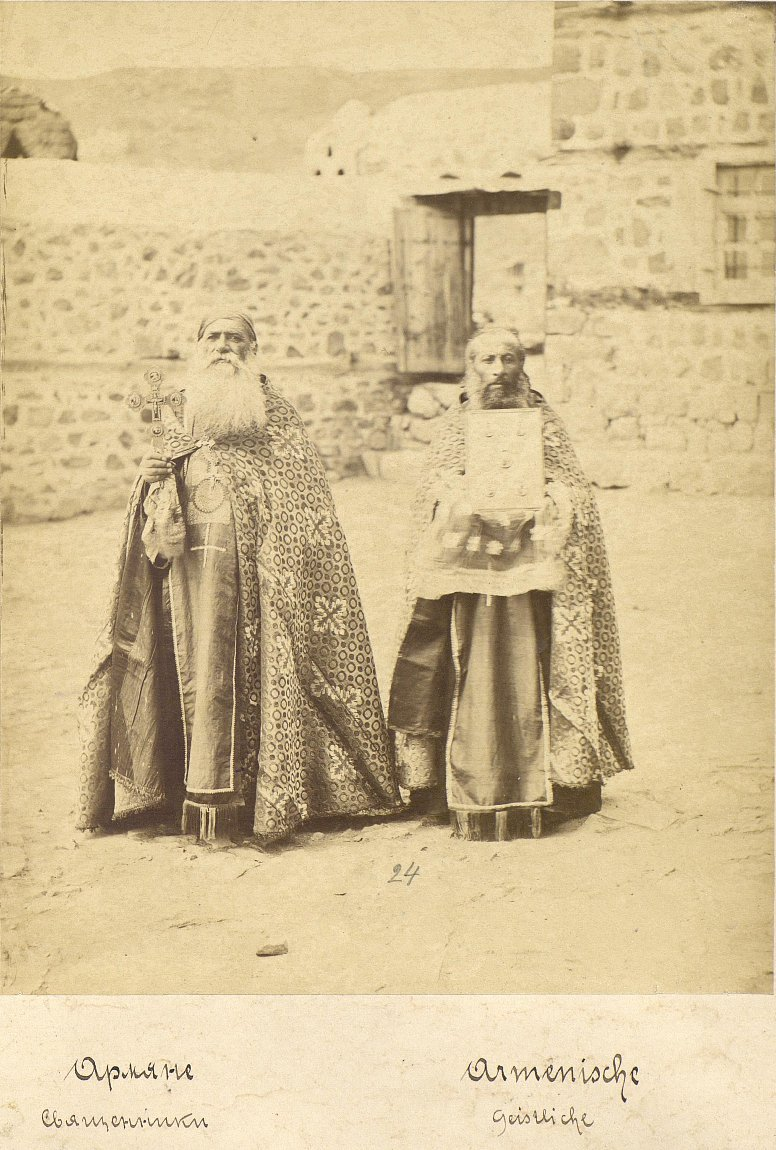
Armenians priests in Kars.

Armenians had lived in Kars and the surrounding region for centuries, and had a significant presence in the city as merchants, artisans, and professionals. In the 19th century, Kars became a center of Armenian intellectual and cultural life, with many Armenian schools, churches, and newspapers. The city was also known for its rich literary and artistic traditions, with prominent Armenian writers, poets, and musicians calling Kars home.

During the 9th century, the Bagratid royal domains included the districts of Vanand and Shirak, which are now part of the modern province of Kars. These regions were historically Armenian and were important centers of the Bagratid kingdom, with Ani serving as the primary capital city.

=== Armenian genocide ===
Historically, Kars had a large Armenian population that had lived in the city for centuries. However, tensions between the Armenian and Turkish communities escalated in the late 19th and early 20th centuries, particularly following the Ottoman Empire's defeat in World War I.

In 1918, Kars briefly fell under Armenian control, but it was soon retaken by Turkish forces. Following this, the Treaty of Kars was signed in 1921, which recognized the Turkish government's control over the region. This period of political turmoil and change had a devastating impact on the Armenian community in Kars.

In the years following the treaty, Armenians in Kars faced persecution and violence, including massacres, forced deportations, and confiscation of property. The Turkish government implemented policies that discriminated against Armenian Christians, leading to the emigration of many Armenians from the region.

The exact number of Armenians who disappeared from Kars during this time is difficult to determine, but estimates suggest that thousands were killed, and the majority of the Armenian population was forced to leave.

=== Cultural sites ===
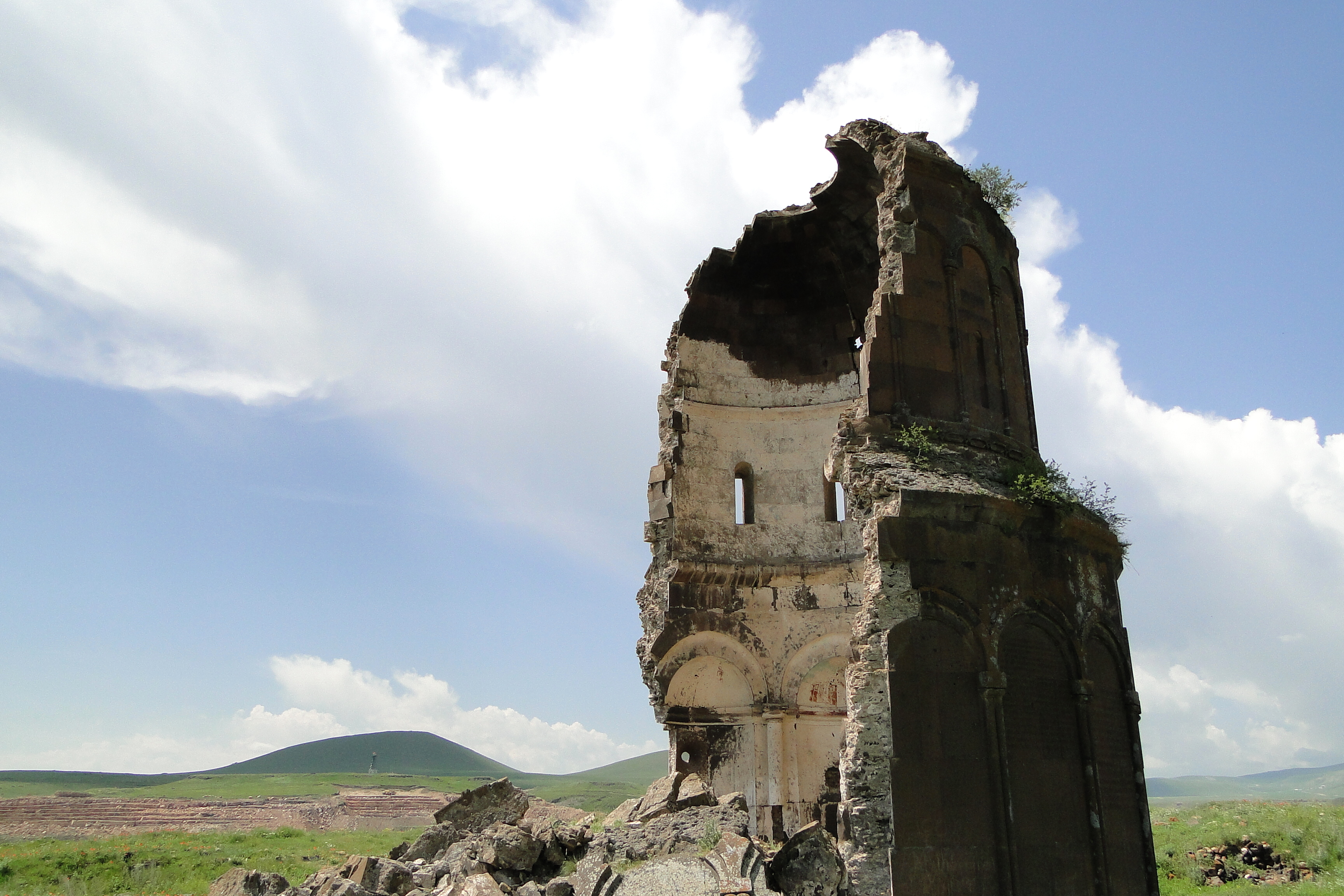
Church of the Redeemer - Ani (Ancient Armenian Capital) - Near Kars - Turkey - 01 (5811795629)

The province of Kars boasts a wealth of Medieval Armenian churches and monasteries, with the city of Ani being a particularly notable example. Originally owned by the noble house of the Kamsarakans before it was acquired by the Bagratids, Ani is renowned for its historical, archaeological, and artistic significance, as it provides a comprehensive overview of the evolution of medieval architecture between the 7th and 13th centuries. In recognition of its value, Ani was added to the UNESCO World Heritage List in 2016. It is the most famous site in the region, with many advertisements promoting it in Kars, hotels offering books and brochures about Ani, and local agencies organizing group trips to the site. Although efforts have been made to preserve it, including reconstruction of the cathedral and other monuments, Ani's architectural remains are mostly in ruins. Additionally, some of the churches are inaccessible due to government restrictions near the border.

One of the most famous Armenian churches in Ani is the Cathedral of Ani, also known as the Church of Holy Savior. Ani, the cosmopolitan capital of medieval Armenia, which was among the first kingdoms to embrace Christianity as its state religion in the early A.D. 300s, now lies in ruins, with only remnants left. Originally established as a fifth-century fortress, Ani was selected as the capital of Armenia in the 10th century. The city flourished with a population of up to 100,000 and an abundance of holy structures, earning it the nickname "city of 1,001 churches."

Other notable Armenian churches in Ani include the Church of St. Gregory of Tigran Honents, the Church of St. Gregory of Gagik, and the Church of the Redeemer. Despite their historical and cultural significance, many of these churches have fallen into disrepair over the centuries due to neglect and natural disasters, and some have even been intentionally destroyed by Turkish authorities in recent years. However, efforts are underway to preserve and protect these important cultural landmarks for future generations.

== Notable Armenians From Kars ==
- Atrpet - Writer
- Abas I of Armenia - king of Bagratid Armenia
- Gagik II of Armenia - King of Ani
- Hripsime Simonyan - Artist and sculptor
- Hovhannes Zardaryan - Painter
- Misak Metsarents an Armenian poet who was born in the village of Garmirbulag, near Kars
- Yeghishe Charents - Poet, writer, public activist

== See also ==
- Armenian Genocide
- Armenians of Van
- Cathedral of Kars
- Kars
- Ottoman Empire
