= Zernek =

- Neighbourhood
- Location in Turkey
- Coordinates: 38°20′46″N 43°37′45″E
- Country: Turkey
- Province: Van
- District: Gürpınar
- Population (2022): 122
- Time zone: UTC+3 (TRT)

Zernek (formerly: Hamurkesen, Zernak or Zerinak) is a neighbourhood of the municipality and district of Gürpınar, Van Province, Turkey. Its population is 122 (2022).

The village became part of the Ottoman Empire in the 16th century and was invaded by the Russian Empire during the First World War. Zernek lies in a valley near the road from Gürpınar to Hoşab and has several ruined historical monuments. Such as an Ottoman mosque in the village which was built in 1710. But its dome was probably destroyed during World War I. Close to the village is a ruined castle, probably medieval with Ottoman repairs. Nearby the castle is another old mosque. There is also a ruined bathhouse and Han (roadside inn) and a medieval Muslim cemetery but some of the stones have been smashed.

The Zernek Dam is located near the village. Other historic castles in the region are Hoşap Castle and the ancient Urartian fortress of Sardurihinilli, excavated between 1961 and 1986 by Afif Erzen.
