= Surp Marinos Monastery =

Armenian Monastery in Turkey

St. Marinos monastery (Srkhouvank) Սուրբ Մարինոս վանք (Սրխուվանք)
- Location within Turkey

Religion
- Region: Eastern Anatolia region
- Status: ceased functioning as a monastery in 1915

Location
- Location: (Turkey) Gürpınar District, Van province
- State: Turkey
- Coordinates: 38.3350°N 43.3328°E

Architecture
- Type: Armenian church
- Style: Armenian
- Completed: 12th century

St. Marinos (Armenian: Սուրբ Մարինոս վանք) is a ruined Armenian Orthodox monastery in the Gürpınar district of Van Province of Turkey, to the southeast of Lake Van. Built in the 12th century, it ceased functioning as a monastery after the Armenian genocide in 1915.

== History ==
The monastery is situated on a slope of a mountain overlooking the wide and fertile lower section of the valley of the Hoşap, now known as the Gürpınar plain and formerly called Hayots Dzor (Armenian: Հայոց Ձոր) meaning: Valley of the Armenians. The date of the foundation of the St. Marinos monastery is not known, and the crudity of its construction makes its buildings difficult to date. It originally had the alternative name of Srkhouvank. It was founded to house a community of nuns and was dedicated to the female saints Marinos and Theodora. It had an active scriptorium during the second half of the 16th century: in Yerevan's Matenadaran museum there exist five manuscripts that are known to have originated in the convent.
