= Hoşap River =

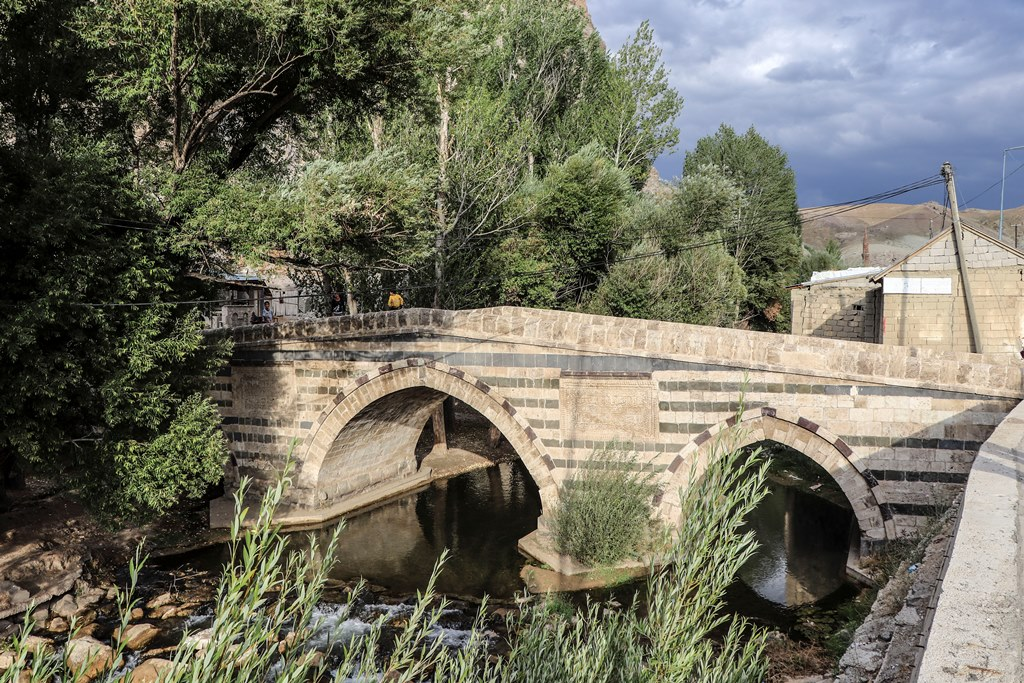
- Hoşap River bridge at Hoşab

- Location within Turkey

Location
- Country: Turkey

Physical characteristics
- Source
  - coordinates: 37.908749°N 43.780944°E
- Mouth: Lake Van
  - coordinates: 38.361034°N 43.144058°E

The Hoşap River or Güzelsu River (Turkish: Engil Çayı) is a river in the Van Province of Turkey. Its catchment area approximately coincides with the Gürpınar District.

== Geography ==
From its source in the İspiriz Mountains near Başkale on the southeast borders of Van Province, the river tends to the northwest. It is cut by the Zernek Dam in the Gürpınar Plain and feeds into lake Van near Dönemeç. The part of the river flowing out of the dam is also called Dönemeç River.

At the end of the river there is the Dönemeç Delta that extends into lake Van. The delta is used by birds during migration and is a breeding area of the endangered White-headed duck and Caspian tern.

The river regime of the Hoşap is nival. The lowest flow is 1.3 m³/sec in August, September and October. The highest flow is 12.6 m³/sec in May due to the rains and melting of snow. The total annual flow of the river is 334,106 m³/year.

== History ==
Historically, the Hoşap River is known as the Khoshab or Anggh River in Armenian.

The Urartians who lived in the region made the best use of water resources. They constructed the Shamiram Canal from the Hoşap river to irrigate arable land around the Lake Van Closed basin in order to practice intensive agricultural activities. A Urartian cuneiform inscription of a temple in Çavuştepe, a Urartian fortified site in the Hoşap valley, says:

I, Khaldi, built this great temple to the god Irmushini and also a great fortress. I built a canal from the Gugunaini [Hoşap] River, I erected vineyards, ploughed fields.

This canal is one of the most remarkable Urartian mastery in water management.

== Sources ==
- Karapetyan, Samvel (2015). Հայոց Ձոր [Hayotsʻ Dzor] (in Armenian). Yerevan: Research on Armenian Architecture. ISBN 9789939843216.
