= Sien =

Sien may refer to:

- Sien of Diauehi, king of an ancient people of north-east Anatolia
- Sien, Germany, an Ortsgemeinde – a municipality belonging to a Verbandsgemeinde, a kind of collective municipality – in the Birkenfeld district in Rhineland-Palatinate, Germany
- Sien Hoornik, mistress of Vincent van Gogh and model for his famous drawing Sorrow
- Wong Foon Sien (1899–1971), Canadian journalist and labour activist
- Osowa Sień
- Ot en Sien, a 1902 old children's book, written by a teacher in Drenthe, the Netherlands
- Red Sien, a 1975 Dutch comedy film directed by Frans Weisz, produced by Rob du Mée
- Sien Sovv
