= Asia (ancient king) =

- King of Diauehi

King of Diauehi
- Reign: 9th century BCE
- Predecessor: Unknown (last known ruler Sien)
- Successor: Unknown (next known ruler Utupurshi)

Asia was a ruler of the Diauehi, a confederation of tribes located in modern northeastern Turkey, who reigned around the middle of the 9th century BCE. He is known from Assyrian sources describing the military campaigns of Shalmaneser III.

== Biography ==
Asia is the second historically confirmed ruler of the Diauehi, an Iron Age confederation of tribes dominating northeast Anatolia. His reign took place in the middle of the 9th century BCE, shortly after the formation of the powerful neighboring Kingdom of Urartu. Like his predecessors, he belonged to Nairi, a political-military alliance of South Caucasus states.

In 845 BCE, he faced an invasion by Assyrian king Shalmaneser III, who had invaded Nairi states and ravaged Urartu. Asia rapidly agreed to submit to Assyrian suzerainty, protecting his kingdom from the destruction his southern neighbors faced.

After the invasion, Asia had to pay an annual tribute to Assyria and became a client king of the empire. In return, Shalmaneser III erected a large statue of Asia in the capital of Diaeuhi.

== Bibliography ==
- Suny, Ronald Grigor (1994). The Making of the Georgian Nation. Indianapolis: Indiana University Press. ISBN 978-0-253-35579-9.
- Chkhartishvili, Mariam (2014). Ქართული წყაროთმცოდნეობა [Georgian studies of ancient sources] (in Georgian). Tbilisi: Universali.
- Melikishvili, Giorgi (1970). Სამხრეთ-დასავლეთ საქართველოს მოსახლეობის უძველესი გაერთიანებები. საქართველოს ისტორიის ნარკვევები. ტ 1 [Ancient associations of the population of South-West Georgia. Essays on the history of Georgia. Volume 1] (in Georgian). Tbilisi.
