= Arinçkus Argishti I Stele =

Urartian stele

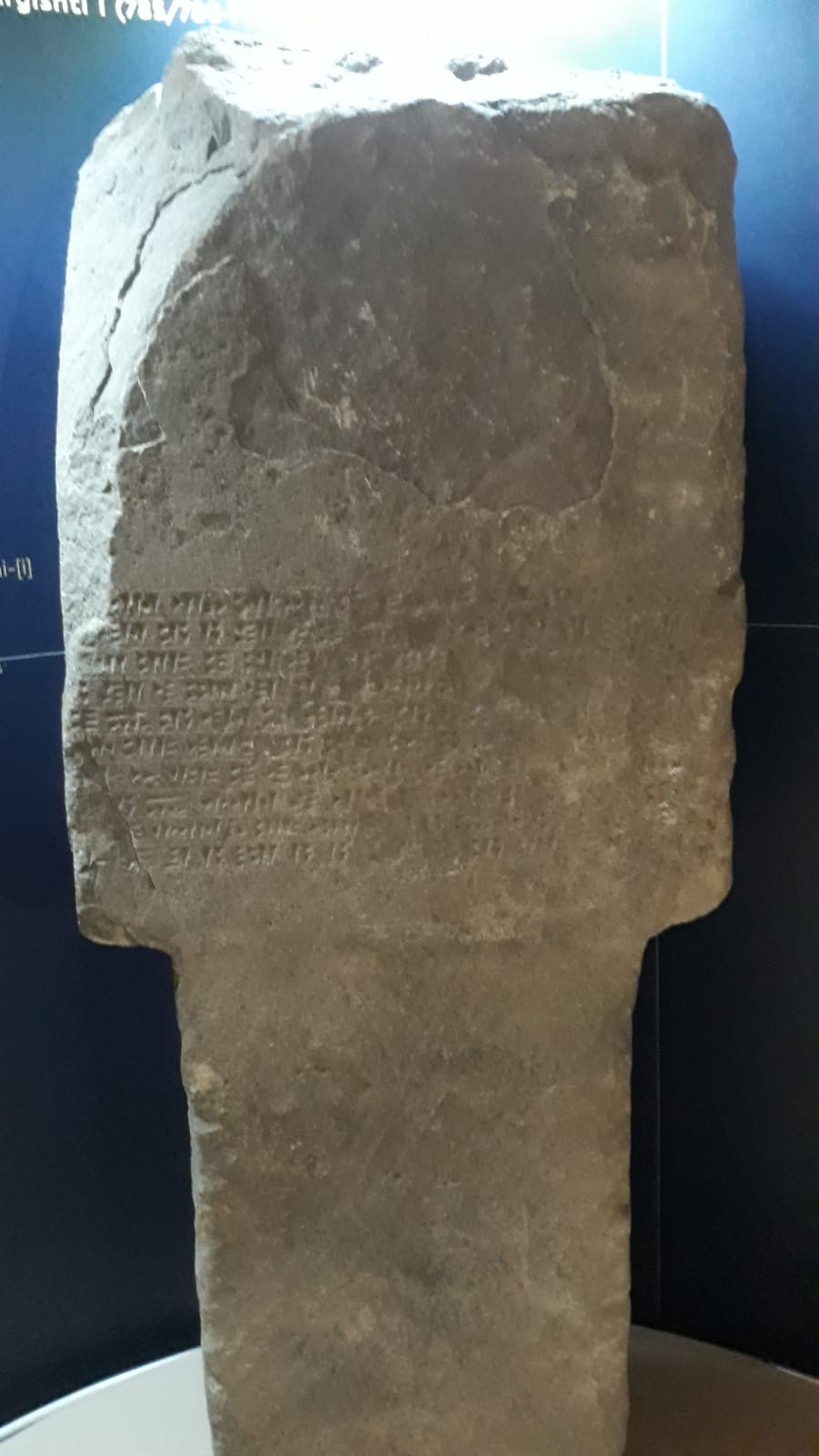
- Material: Stone
- Writing: Urartian language
- Created: 785 BC
- Discovered: 2015
- Present location: Bitlis Ahlat Museum

The Arinçkus Argishti I Stele (Turkish: Arinçkus Argişti Steli) is a stele belonging to the Urartian king Argishti I, dated between 785 BC and 756 BC. It has an Urartian inscription written in cuneiform script.

== Finding ==
The artifact was found in 2015 by Kenan Işık, an officer of the Van Archeology Museum, in Köklü Village of Van province, located around Lake Van.

== Text ==
1 [^{m}a]r-gi-iš-ti-i-še ^{m}mi-˹nu˺- ?-ḫi-ni-[še]

2 [a-l]i-e a-lu-še i-ni ^{[NA]4}pu-lu-si e-si-[ni]

3 su-ú-i-du-li-e a-˹lu˺- še še-er-du-li-˹e˺

4 ˹a˺-lu-še DUB-te pi-tú-li-e [a-lu-]˹še˺ a-i-ni-[i]

5 i-ni-e-li du-li-i-e a-˹lu˺-[še ˹ú˺-li-še?

6 ti-ú-li-i-e i-e-še za-du-bi tú-ri-ni-n[i]

7 ^{˹D˺}ḫal-di-i- še ^{˹D˺}IM-še ^{˹D˺}UTU-ni? DINGIR ^{MEŠ}

8 [ma]-a-ni ar-mu-zi-i ^{˹D˺}UTU-ni pi-i-n[i]

9 [mi]- ˹i˺ ar-ḫi ú-ru-˹li˺-a-ni mì-i-i

mi]- ˹i˺ na-a-ra-a a-ú-i-e ú-lu-li-e

=== English translation ===
"Argishti, son of Minua, says: Whoever carries this stele (from here), whoever hides (it), whoever damages its inscription, whoever does these things, whoever says "I have done this!"; God Haldi, Storm God, May the Sun God and (all) the gods destroy him and his offspring under the ray of the sun.” (The meanings of the words in the last two lines have not yet been deciphered.)
