= Qaquli =

Urartian queen

Qaquli was an Urartian queen from the 7th century BC. Discovered in 2008 through excavations at Ayanis, a fortress erected by her husband, Rusa II, she appears to be his main wife, meaning the queen consort of Urartu.

Along with queen Tariria, she is one of the two known women members of the Urartian royal family.

== Biography ==
Previously completely forgotten, her existence was rediscovered in 2008 through excavations at Ayanis, which unearthed objects bearing her name and brief inscriptions describing her as the queen of Urartu. One of these objects is the golden pommel of a fan, with an inscription stating that it belonged to her. She appears to be the principal wife of Rusa II, and thus was probably the queen consort of the kingdom. Ayanis seems to have been a retreat for the royal couple, which explains the discovery of these objects there.

Along with Tariria, she is one of the two known female members of the Urartian royal family.
