= Dönemeç =

- Neighbourhood
- Location in Turkey
- Coordinates: 38.3428°N 43.2290°E
- Country: Turkey
- Province: Van
- District: Edremit
- Population (2022): 780
- Time zone: UTC+3 (TRT)

Dönemeç (Armenian: Անգղ, romanized: Angegh; Kurdish: Engîl) is a neighbourhood of the municipality and district of Edremit, Van Province, Turkey. Its population is 780 (2022). It is located on the right bank of the Hoşap River at a distance of 15 km from the town of Edremit.

== Name ==
The village was originally called Engil, from the Armenian name of the village Anggh (variations include Ang, Angegh, and Anguyl), which literally means "vulture" in Armenian. The village was supposedly named this because of the large number of vultures living in the area. It was renamed Dönemeç during the republican era.

== Geography ==
Dönemeç is located 7 km away from the coast of Lake Van, on the right bank of the Engil River, also called the Dönemeç or Hoşap River (historically known as the Khoshab or Anggh River in Armenian). The village is about 1660 to 1685 meters above sea level.

== History ==
The village was historically populated by Armenians and fell into the Hayots Dzor canton of the Vaspurakan province of historical Armenia. There are a number of ruined churches and monasteries in the area surrounding the village.

In 1872 a number of inhabitants of the village wrote a letter seeking to cooperate with the secret organization "Union for Salvation" (Miut’yun i P’rkut’yun), which was founded in Van that same year and aimed at the betterment of conditions for Armenians, one of the first such Armenian political organizations.

In 1877, the village fell victim to a raid by the Kurdish tribal leader Jalaleddin. Many of the villagers were killed during the Hamidian massacres. The village was periodically attacked and looted after 1896. Its population was approximately 495 at the beginning of the twentieth century, consisting mainly of Armenians and a few Kurds. During the Armenian genocide, most of the village's inhabitants were massacred, while a small number managed to flee and reach Eastern Armenia.

Since the Armenian genocide the village has been inhabited by Kurds.

== Demographics ==
Historical population of Dönemeç
Year	Armenian		Kurdish		Total	
Year	Households	Persons	Households	Persons	Households	Persons
1855	53	315			53	315
1873	50				50	
1883	70				70	
1895	60				60	
1897	84		1		85	
1906	90–100				90–100	
1909	105	492			105	492
1914	108	678			108	678
1915 (pre-genocide)	150	880			150	880
Nov. 1915	6	30			6	30
Oct. 1916	21				21	
1990				940		940
2000				1249		1249
2011				1207		1207
2012				1170		1170
