= Sien of Diauehi =

Sien
- King of Diaokhi

King of Diaokhi
- Reign: 12th century BCE
- Predecessor: Unknown
- Successor: Unknown (next known ruler Asya)

Sien is one of the first historically-confirmed rulers of the Kingdom of Diaokhi, a confederation of proto-Georgian tribes. Ruling toward the end of the 12th century BCE, he is known from Assyrian sources describing the invasion of his kingdom by Tiglath-Pileser I in 1112 BCE.

== Biography ==
Sien is the first historically-confirmed ruler of the tribal confederation known as the Kingdom of Diaokhi. He reigned toward the end of the 12th century BCE, most likely shortly after the creation of the kingdom. He joined his domains to Nairi, a political-military alliance between South Caucasus states.

In 1112 BCE, he had to face the invasion of Assyrian King Tiglath-Pileser I, who had launched an attack on Nairi states. Sien gathered 60 tribes spanning from the northeast of Anatolia to Colchis and formed a large army. But he was rapidly defeated and the Assyrian ruler pursued him until the Black Sea shores before capturing him.

Tiglath-Pileser I deposed Sien and had him deported toward his capital Assur when the latter refused to submit as had the other rulers of Nairi. A captive Sien had to accept his status as a client king of Assyria, recognizing the supremacy of the deity Ashur, and promised his and his descendant's loyalty toward Assyrian kings. He was then allowed to return to Diaokhi but was made to pay an annual tribute of 1,200 horses and 2,000 cattle.

== Bibliography ==
- Asatiani, Nodar; Janelidze, Otar (2009). History of Georgia. Tbilisi: Publishing House Petite. ISBN 978-9941-9063-6-7.
- Rawlinson, Sir Henry (1901). Babylonian and Assyrian Literature. New York: P. F. Collier & Son.
- Asatiani, Nodar; Bendianashvili, Alexandre (1997). Histoire de la Géorgie. Paris: L'Harmattan. ISBN 2-7384-6186-7.
- Asatiani, Nodar (2001). Საქართველოს ისტორია [History of Georgia] (in Georgian). Tbilisi: Sakartvelos Matsne.
- Ahman, Ali Yaseed (2017). Some Neo-Assyrian Provincial Administrators. Ann Arbor: ProQuest.
