= Armenians of Van =

Armenian community in Van, Turkey

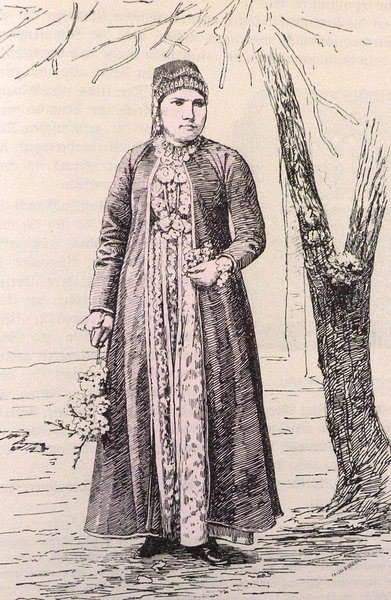
Armenian woman from Van, 1897

The Armenians of Van, also known as the Vanetsis, existed for several centuries. Van is a city located in Eastern Turkey, near the border with Armenia. Armenians have inhabited the region for thousands of years, and their history is closely intertwined with the history of the city.

== History ==
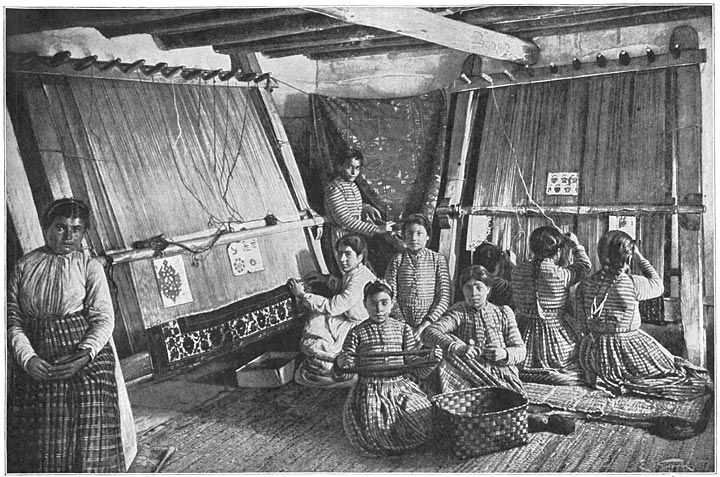
Van Armenian Weavers in 1907.

The people of Van who were of Armenian descent often had to confront invading forces and were occasionally subjected to harsh conditions inflicted by both human and natural factors. As per Armenian tradition, Hayk, the ancestor of the nation, founded one of his earliest settlements in the southern central region of the country, specifically in the Hayotz Dzor valley and its fortress called Hayk. This location and its valley came to be known as Hayastan in Armenian, named after Hayk. The name Hayastan remained associated with the fortress and valley for eternity.

Following the decline of the Urartian kingdom, the region came under the control of various empires, including the Persian Empire, the Roman Empire, and the Byzantine Empire. In the 9th century CE, the Armenian Bagratid dynasty established an independent kingdom in the region, centered around the city of Ani.

=== Armenian genocide ===
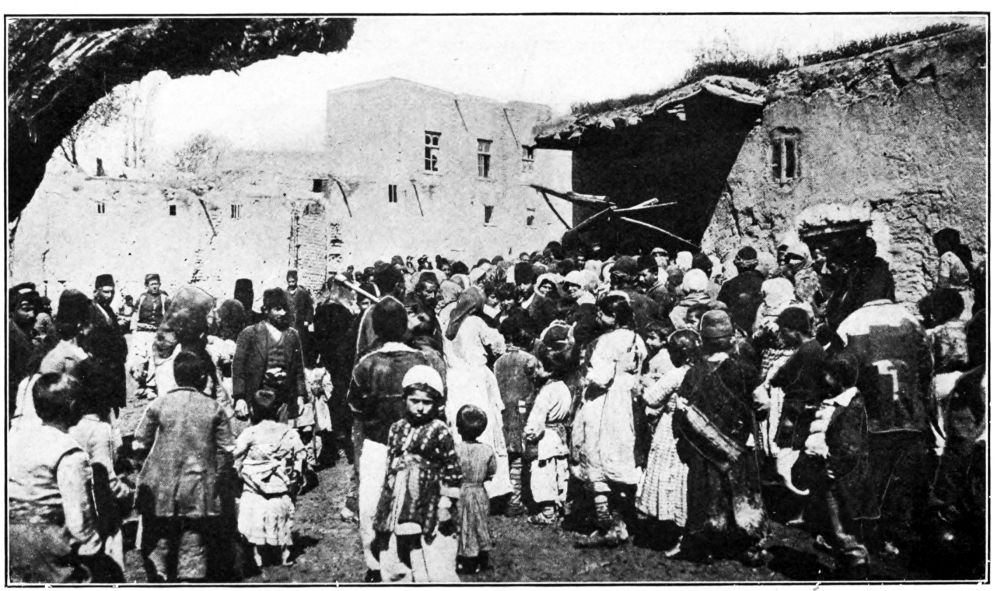
Armenian refugees at Van crowding around a public oven during 1915 hoping to receive bread.

During the 16th and 17th centuries, Van was ruled by the Ottoman Empire. The Ottoman Empire was known for its policy of millet, which recognized different religious and ethnic groups as distinct communities with their own laws and customs. The Armenians of Van were granted a degree of autonomy under this system, and they played an important role in the economic and cultural life of the city.

In the late 19th century, the Ottoman Empire began to experience a period of decline and instability. During this time, tensions between the Armenian and Turkish communities in Van began to escalate. In 1895, Ottoman authorities massacred thousands of Armenians in the region, sparking widespread protests and condemnation from the international community.

In 1915, the Ottoman Empire launched a systematic campaign of violence and displacement against its Armenian population. This campaign, which is known as the Armenian Genocide, resulted in the deaths of an estimated 1.5 million Armenians. Many of the Armenians of Van were among the victims of this campaign.

Following the end of World War I, the Treaty of Sèvres granted the Armenians a degree of autonomy in the region of Van. However, this autonomy was short-lived, as the Treaty of Lausanne, which was signed in 1923, abolished the Armenian autonomy and established the modern borders of Turkey.

== Dialect ==
Van
- Wan
- Վանի բարբառ Vani barpar
- Native to: Turkey
- Region: Van, Vardenis and surrounding villages
- Ethnicity: Vanetsis
- Language family: Indo-European: Armenian; Western; Van
- Dialects: Torfavan
- Writing system: Armenian alphabet

Language codes
- ISO 639-3: (included in Western Armenian hyw)
- Glottolog: vann1243 Van vani1249 Vanic
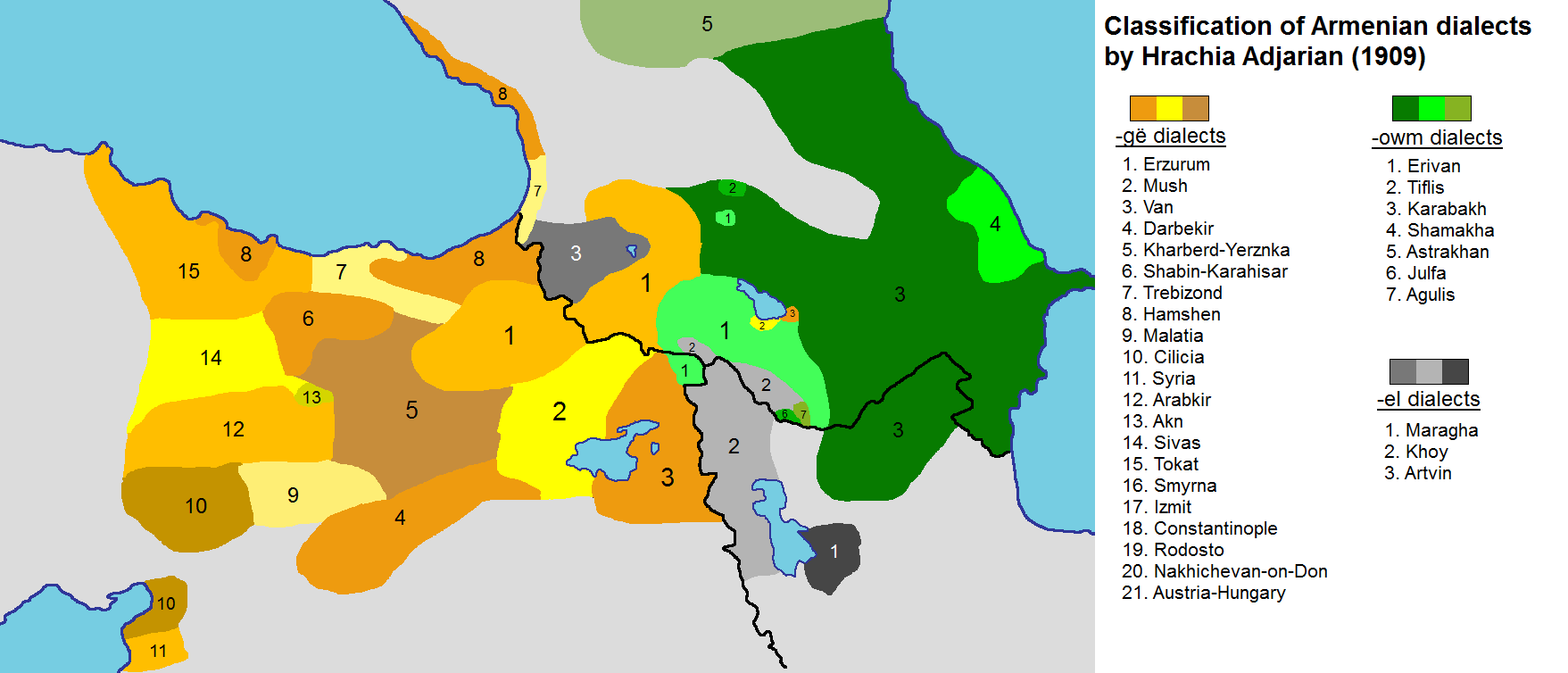
- Van

The Van dialect is a dialect belonging to the two-level vowel-less group of the Armenian branch. It was spoken on the eastern side of Lake Van, with the centre being the city of Van. The Van dialect was also spoken in small pockets next to Lake Sevan, particularly the town of Vardenis, which was the result of emigration after the Russo-Turkish War (1828–1829).

== See also ==
- Armenians of Kars
