= Zernek Dam =

- Location within Turkey
- Official name: Zernek Baraji
- Country: Turkey
- Coordinates: 38°21′19″N 43°39′24″E
- Status: Operational
- Construction began: 1980
- Opening date: 1988
- Owner: Turkish State Hydraulic Works

Dam and spillways
- Type of dam: Embankment, rock-fill with clay core
- Impounds: Hoşap River
- Height: 80 m (262 ft)
- Dam volume: 2,100,000 m^{3} (2,746,696 cu yd)

Reservoir
- Total capacity: 104×10^{6} m^{3} (84,314 acre⋅ft)
- Surface area: 5 km^{2} (2 mi^{2})

Power Station
- Installed capacity: 5 MW

Zernek Dam is a rock-fill embankment dam on the Hoşap River, located near the village Zernek, 28 km (17 mi) southeast of Van in Van Province, Turkey. It was built between 1980 and 1988 and has an installed capacity of 5 MW.

== See also ==
- List of dams and reservoirs in Turkey
