= Menua =

King of Urartu

King of Urartu
- Reign: c. 810–c. 786 BC
- Predecessor: Ishpuini
- Successor: Argishti I
- Born: ca. 850 BC
- Died: ca. 786 BC
- Queen consort: Tariria
- Issue: Inushpua, Tariria, Argishti I
- Father: Ishpuini

Menua (Urartian: ^{m}Me-i-nu-a; Meinua or Minua) was the fifth known king of Urartu from around 810 BC to 786 BC. In Armenian, Menua is rendered as Menua. The name Menua may be connected etymologically to the Ancient Greek names Minos and Minyas.

== Family ==
He was the son of Ishpuini and born to [...]. He married Tariria.

== Reign ==
=== Coregency ===
A younger son of the preceding Urartian King, Ishpuini, Menua was adopted as co-ruler by his father in the last years of his reign.

An inscription refers to both Ishpuini and Menua: For the god Ḫaldi, the (or, resp., his/their) Lord, Išpuini, son of Sarduri, (and) [Minua, son of Išp]u[ini . . . (large gap, presumably to be restored by five royal titles) . . . lord] of Ṭušpa-City.

Menua must have been of some age when he became coregent, as an inscription (CUT A 04-01) mentions his father, himself and his son Inušpua.

=== Sole reign ===
Menua enlarged the kingdom through numerous wars against the neighbouring countries and left many inscriptions across the region, by far the most of any Urartian ruler. He organized a centralised administrative structure, fortified a number of towns and constructed fortresses. Amongst these was Menuakhinili located near Mount Ararat (its exact location is uncertain, perhaps at Bulakbaşı, east of modern-day Iğdır).

He briefly co-ruled with his son, Inushpua, but was succeeded by another son, Argishti I. Menua also had a daughter named Tariria, after whom a certain vineyard was named Taririakhinli.

Apart from the Kepenek Castle inscription, another inscription proving the existence of the Urartian Kingdom in the geography of Muş is the Alazlı/Tirmet inscription. The inscription in question is located 25.5 km east of Muş province and 6.2 km south of Korkut district. In the inscription, the war fought by the Urartian king Menua is mentioned:

Menua, the son of İşpuini, brought this stone to our Lord Haldi. he sewed. Tann Haldi went on a military expedition with his spear. He captured the city of Trtimi in the territory of the country of Urme.

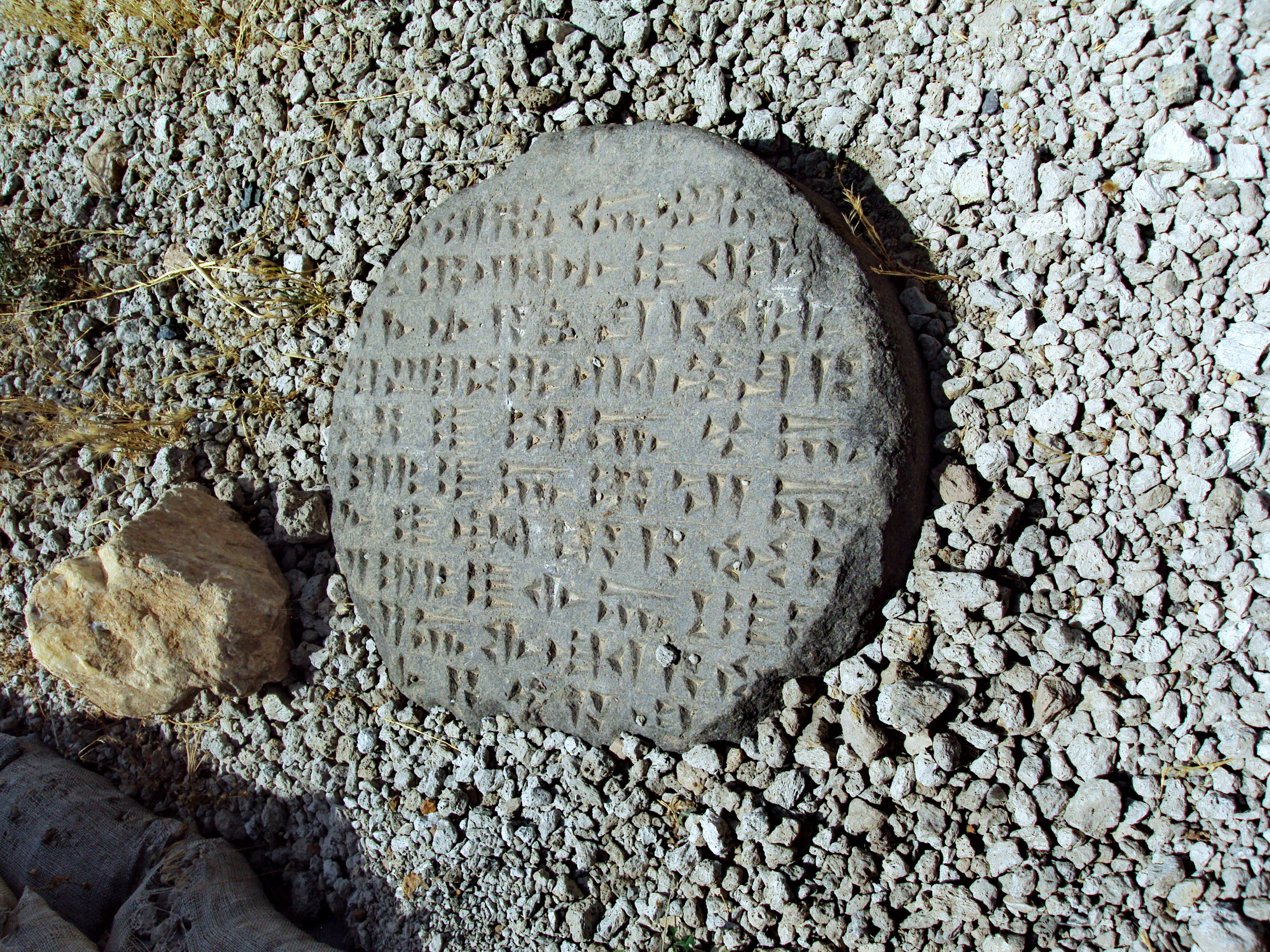
Fragment of a cuneiform inscription of King Menua on Akdamar Island

It is believed that Menua founded the city of Manazkert (Malazgirt).

==== Vassalage of Diauehi ====
In the northwest (Georgia), Menua campaigned against and defeated Uṭuburšini, King of the Diauehi, who became a vassal paying tribute.

== Legacy ==
=== Menua Canal ===
Menua developed a canal and irrigation system that stretched across the kingdom. The most significant of these was a 45-mile canal from the Hoşap valley to Van, which was named the Menua Canal after the king. It flowed at a rate of 1500 to 3000 litres of water per second, depending on the time of the year. Several of these canals are still in use today.

Menua became the first of Urartu's kings who designed and constructed irrigation networks that contributed to farming and, in part, to the development of the vineyard in Urartu. Menuapili canal was about 72 km length. The canal was 4.5 meters wide and 1.5 meters deep, and reached the capital of Urartu, Tosp (Van).

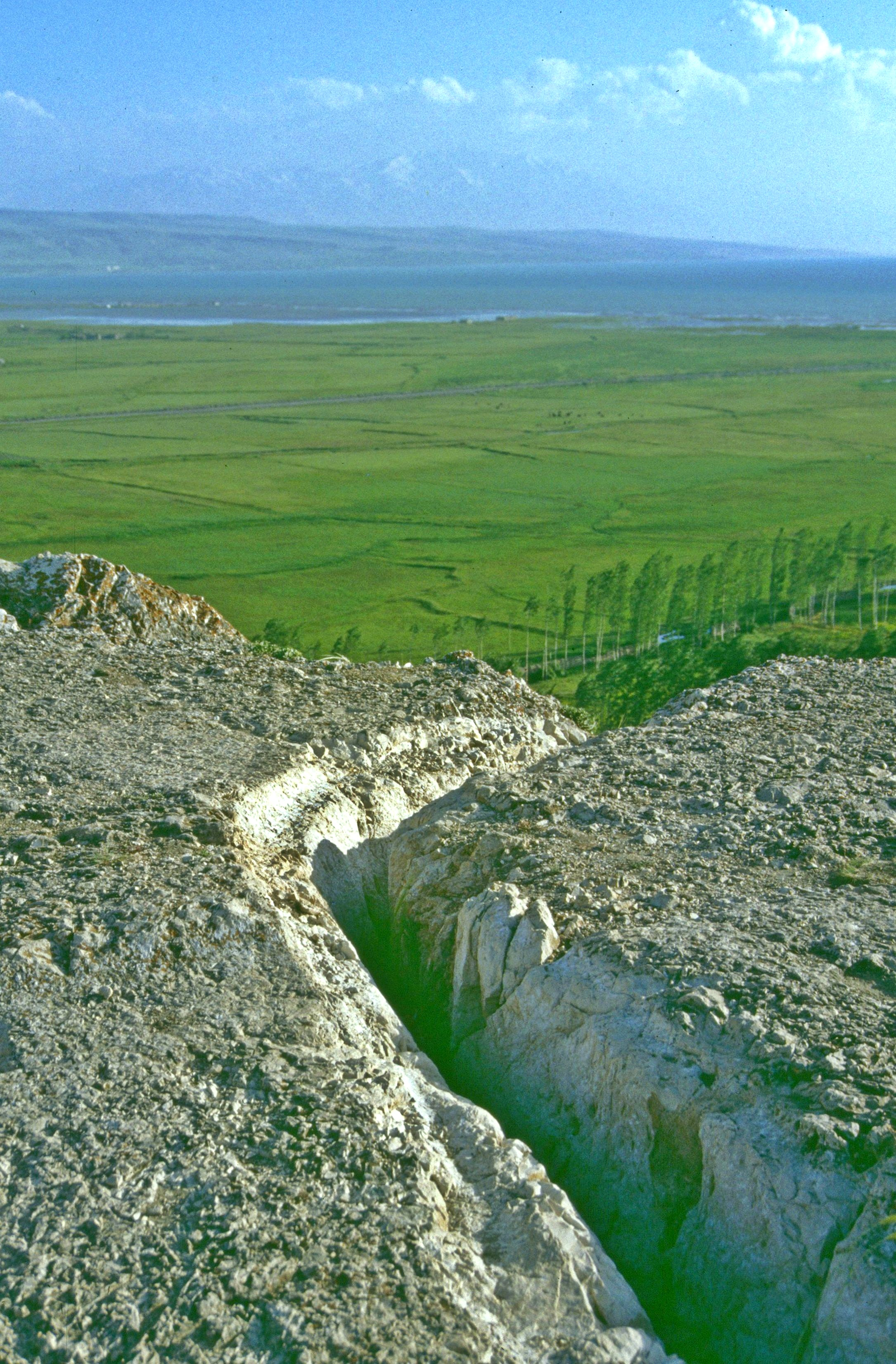
Part of the Menua Canal with Lake Van in the background

The canal passes in some places along the slopes, dug with rocks, and in the lower parts of the canal it was built especially from huge stones and over a wide and unbreakable wall with a height of 15–20 meters. Menuapili of which there are still many parts existing, working to supply irrigation and drinking water to the city of Van and the surrounding villages, is one of the surviving monuments of ancient Armenian culture and one of the oldest medieval civilization famous constructions. Menuapili is one of the oldest major canals in the Middle East, for that reason it was called by many historians a river.

The Assyrian king Sennacherib is well known like Urartian king Menua in constructing hydraulic engineering works some of these well-constructed tunnels are still in use today. Sennacherib used the expertise of Urartian technicians since they were well known for their skill in constructing hydraulic installations. The biggest canal he build was only 19 km in length comparing with Menua's canal which was 72 km in length. Urartu's cultural development in the water sector has had a considerable impact on the development of northern Mesopotamia and the same cultural field of Assyria. The flow of irrigation canals is from north to south, from Urartu to Assyria, i.e. from the Armenian Highland to Mesopotamia. Menua was one of the candidates to whom the title "Shinarar” i.e. builder can be given legally, and when Menua died in 780 B.C. Urartu was empire and equaled to his strong opponent Assyria.

== See also ==
- List of kings of Urartu
- Malazgirt
- Menua Canal
