= Utupurshi =

- King of Diaokhi

King of Diaokhi
- Reign: 9th-8th century BCE
- Predecessor: Unknown (previous known ruler Asya)
- Successor: Unknown (last known ruler)

Utupurshi is the last known ruler of the kingdom of Diaokhi, a confederation of proto-Georgian tribes. His reign spanned over three decades during which he faced the expansionist policy of neighboring Urartu. He fought several battles against kings Menua and Argishti I in the first half of the 8th century BCE. His reign is documented through Urartian texts.

== Biography ==
=== Menua's Invasion ===
Utupurshi is the last known ruler of the Kingdom of Diaokhi, a confederation of tribes in northeastern Anatolia. He reigned in the end of the 9th century and the early 8th century BCE over dozens of proto-Georgian tribes controlling territories from Anatolia to Colchis, from his capital Sasilu (close to the modern Turkish town of Tortum).

Early on, he had to face his powerful southern neighbor, Urartu, whose king Menua (810-786 BCE) led an expansionist policy toward the South Caucasus and saw Diaokhi as the region's center. Menua captured Sasilu after a battle but Utupurshi took refuge in the northeast of the kingdom. Menua continued his campaign, capturing several fortresses and the city of Zua on his way.

Utupurshi was forced to accept his defeat after the fall of his last stronghold, Utu. He recognized himself as a vassal of Urartu and was made to pay an annual tribute of gold and silver, in return for the freeing of Diaokhian prisoners captured during the invasion.

=== Revolt ===
Utupurshi's loyalty toward Urartu remained flimsy (Menua himself calls the kingdom a "troubling subject"). Using Menua's death in 786 BCE, he proclaimed his independence by refusing to pay tribute to his successor, Argishti I (786-764 BCE), who launched a campaign against him in 785 BCE. Utupurshi was quickly defeated after the capture of his new capital Zua and agreed once again to Urartu's domination over his kingdom. Argishti I had his victory inscribed over a building in Zua.

A few years later, while Urartu was busy with wars against Assyria, Utupurshi decided to once again revolt. Argishti I returned to Diaokhi and burned down Zua, though keeping Utupurshi on the throne.

In 768 BCE, Utupurshi launched a third revolt but was once again defeated by Argishti I, who chose to annex the southern territories of Diaokhi. Urartu build a series of fortresses on its border with Diaokhi as part of a strategy to rapidly respond to any further challenge to his power. Argishti I would die four years later, and Utupurshi disappeared from historical sources. Diaokhi's final collapse at the hands of a Colchis-Urartu alliance took place either at the end of his reign or shortly after his death.

== Bibliography ==
- Asatiani, Nodar; Bendianashvili, Alexandre (1997). Histoire de la Géorgie. Paris: L'Harmattan. ISBN 2-7384-6186-7.
- Asatiani, Nodar; Janelidze, Otar (2009). History of Georgia. Tbilisi: Publishing House Petite. ISBN 978-9941-9063-6-7.
- Chkhartishvili, Mariam (2014). Ქართული წყაროთმცოდნეობა [Georgian studies of ancient sources] (in Georgian). Tbilisi: Universali.
- Suny, Ronald Grigor (1994). The Making of the Georgian Nation. Indianapolis: Indiana University Press. ISBN 978-0-253-35579-9.
- Asatiani, Nodar (2001). Საქართველოს ისტორია [History of Georgia] (in Georgian). Tbilisi: Sakartvelos Matsne.
- Melikishvili, Giorgi (1970). Სამხრეთ-დასავლეთ საქართველოს მოსახლეობის უძველესი გაერთიანებები. საქართველოს ისტორიის ნარკვევები. ტ 1 [Ancient associations of the population of South-West Georgia. Essays on the history of Georgia. Volume 1] (in Georgian). Tbilisi.
- Kavtaradze, Giorgi Leon (2002). An Attempt to Interpret some Anatolian and Caucasian Ethnonyms of the Classical Sources. Tbilisi: Tbilisi State University.
