= Çavuştepe =

8th century BC fortified site in Turkey

Çavuştepe Հայկաբերդ
- Gürpınar, Van, Turkey
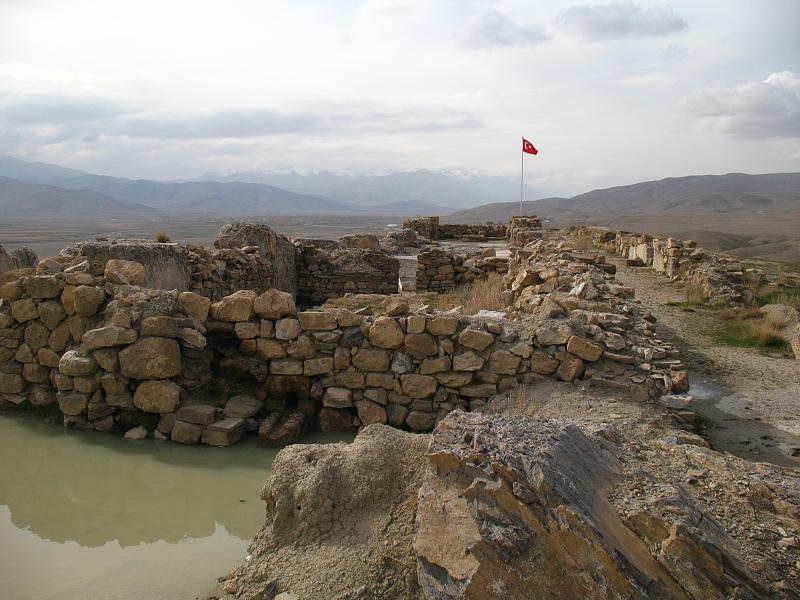
- The ruins of Urartian Sardurihinilli.

Site information
- Type: Fortified City

Location
- Shown within Turkey
- Coordinates: 38.352443°N 43.459393°E

Site history
- Built: 1st millennium BC
- Built by: Sarduri II
- Materials: Stone
- Demolished: Partially

Sardurihinilli, also known as Haykaberd (Armenian: Հայկաբերդ, lit. 'Fortress of Hayk') or Çavuştepe Kalesi, is an ancient Urartian fortified site located on a ridge on the northeastern edge of the village of Çavuştepe in the Gürpınar district of Van Province in eastern Turkey. It is located approximately 25 kilometers southeast of Van along the road leading to the city of Hakkâri, in a valley once known as Hayots Dzor in historic Armenia. It was founded by the Urartian king Sarduri II (r. 764–735) some time during his reign in the 8th century BC and is believed to be identical with the fortress of Sardurihurda mentioned in the same king's cuneiform inscriptions.

In Armenian folklore it is identified with Haykaberd or Haykʻ, the fortress built by Hayk, the legendary founder of the Armenian nation, close to the site where he slew the invading Babylonian king Bel.

== Site ==
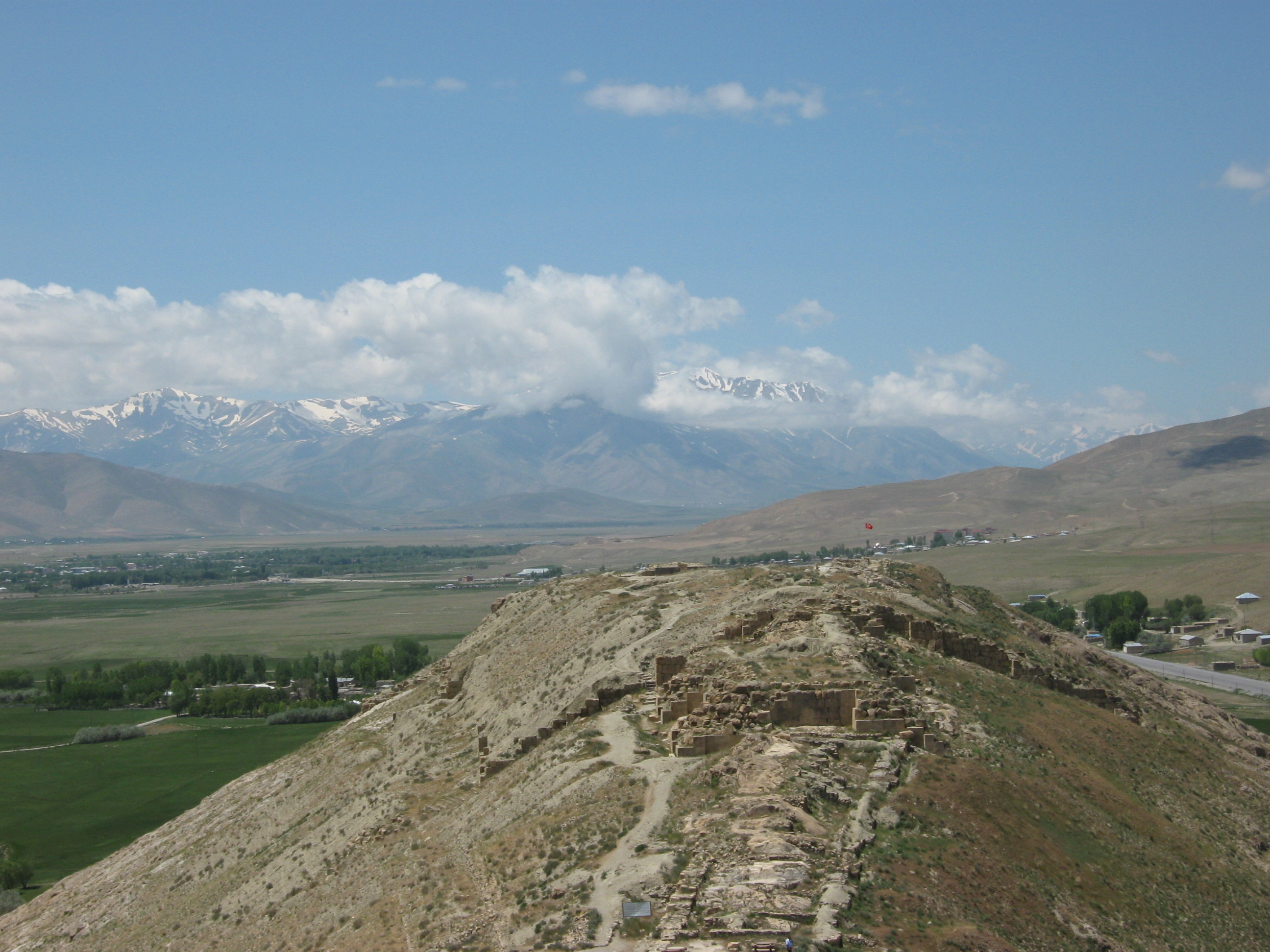
The site of Haykaberd.

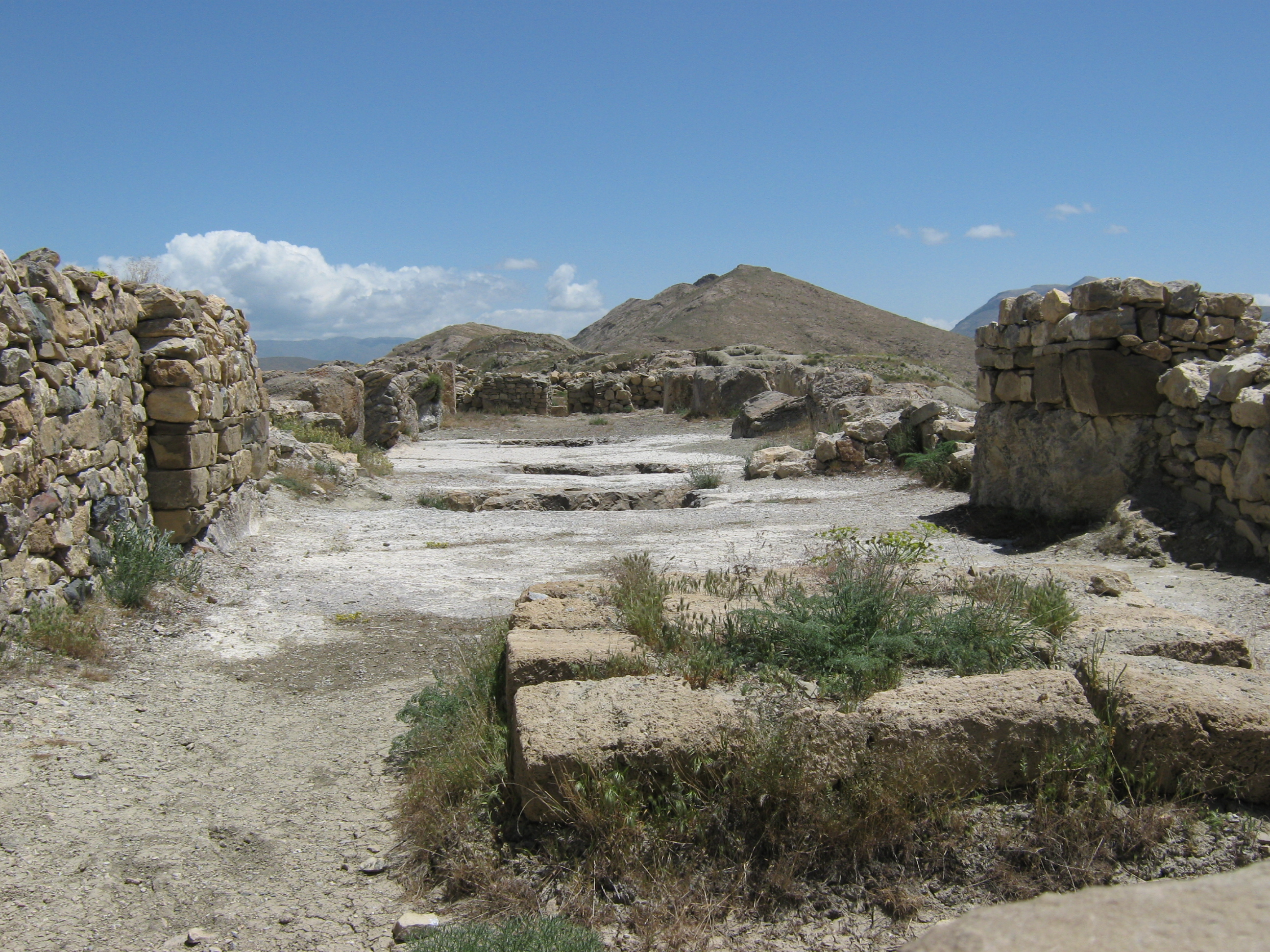
Part of Urartian Sardurihinilli.

Sardurihinilli has a linear plan, perched upon a ridge overlooking the Gürpınar Plain called Bol Dağı. It is composed of fortification walls as well as the remains of an Urartian royal palace, built between 764 and 735 BC during the reign of King Sarduri II at the climax of power of the Urartian Empire. There are upper and lower sections of the fortress in which the Temple of Khaldi or Irmushini, citadel walls, king's tower, workshops (7th century BC), storehouses, cisterns, kitchen, palace with a throne room, "royal" toilet, harem and colonnaded halls were located. A moat surrounded sections of the fortress.

The fortress stands out by the high quality of its masonry, which, in the view of C. A. Burney, suggests that it was "a wealthy town, of which only the acropolis remains to this day." Aside from the cyclopean wall, the blocks used in the fortress are smoothly finished and fit exactly together without mortar being used.

If Sardurihinilli is to be identified with Sardurihurda, then it is located near the site of a city called Ulhu, which Assyrian inscriptions say Sargon II conquered during his campaign against Urartu, although it seems Sardurihurda did not fall to the Assyrians.

Four Urartian cuneiform inscriptions have been discovered at Sardurihinilli, of which the best preserved one reads as follows:

This temple is dedicated to the god Irmushini; I, Sarduri, son of Argishti, constructed it in a great feat when I took the throne in my father's place. Sarduri speaks: the rock was solid and nothing was built here. I, Khaldi, built this great temple to the god Irmushini and also a great fortress. I built a canal from the Gugunaini (Hoşap), I erected vineyards, ploughed fields; I built a new city here, created great monuments, established the name of Sardurihinili. Sarduri speaks: life and glory, as well as rule, power, strength, and happinness to Sarduri, son of Argishti, from Khaldi, from the Khaldian gates, and from the god Irmushini. Sarduri, the powerful king, the great king, the king of Biainili, ruler of the city of Tushpa.

Sardurihinilli was destroyed in the 7th century BC, presumably by the Scythians or Medes. Traces of a later medieval occupation exist. In 1884, a cuneiform inscription from the site was taken to Vienna and published by D. H. Müller. Nikolai Marr and Joseph Orbeli visited the site in 1916 and collected some artifacts that are now located at the Hermitage. Carl Ferdinand Friedrich Lehmann-Haupt was the first to conduct excavations at the site and draw up a sketch-plan of the fortress. C. A. Burney visited the site in 1956 and published a brief description and sketch-plan of the fortress. The site was excavated between 1961 and 1986 by Afif Erzen.

== Sources ==
- Belli, O. (2001). Çavuştepe (Šardurḫinili) Excavations. In: O. Belly (ed.): İstanbul University’s Contributions to Archaeology in Turkey 1932-2000. Istanbul, pp. 173–178.
- Burney, C. A. (1957). "Urartian Fortresses and Towns in the Van Region". Anatolian Studies. 7: 37–53. doi:10.2307/3642346. ISSN 0066-1546.
- Erzen, A. (1978). Çavuştepe I. M. Ö. 7.-6. Yüzyil Urartu Mımarlik Antilari ve Ortaçağ Nekropolü. Ankara.
- Erzen, A. (1978): Ausgrabungen auf der urartäischen Burg Çavuştepe im Gebiet von Van. In: E. Akurgal (ed.): The Proceedings of the Xth International Congress of Classical Archaeology, Ankara-İzmir, 23-30.9.1973. Ankara, pp. 55–59.
- Karapetyan, Samvel (2015). Հայոց Ձոր [Hayotsʻ Dzor] (in Armenian). Yerevan: Research on Armenian Architecture. ISBN 9789939843216.
- Yesayan, S. A.; Kilimjyan, G. S. (1991). "Հայկաբերդ ամրոցը" [Haikaberd castle]. Lraber Hasarakakan Gitutyunneri (in Armenian). 6 (6): 102–113. ISSN 0320-8117.
- Zimansky, Paul (1985). Ecology and Empire: The Structure of the Urartian State (PDF). Oriental Institute of the University of Chicago. ISBN 0-918986-41-9. OCLC 469553313.

== See also ==
- Urartu
- Hayk
- Bel (mythology)
