= Gürpınar, Van =

Gürpınar Hayots Dzor / Հայոց Ձոր
- District and municipality
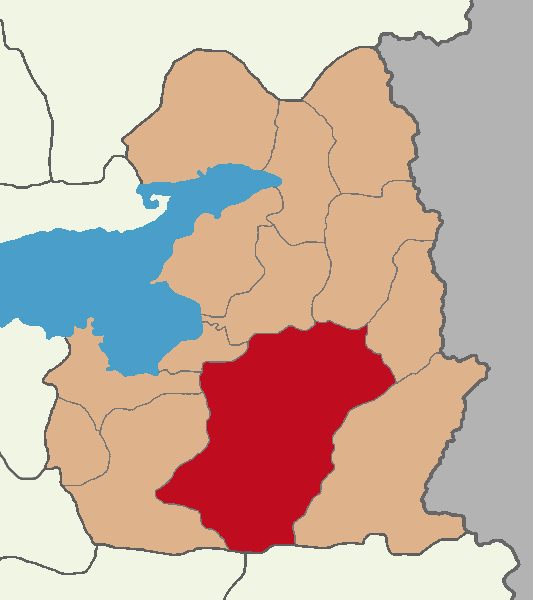
- Map showing Gürpınar District in Van Province

- Location in Turkey
- Coordinates: 38°19′37″N 43°24′48″E
- Country: Turkey
- Province: Van

Government
  - Mayor: Hayrullah Tanış (AKP)
- Area: 4,028 km^{2} (1,555 sq mi)
- Population (2022): 31,865
  - Density: 7.911/km^{2} (20.49/sq mi)
- Time zone: UTC+3 (TRT)
- Postal code: 65900
- Area code: 0432
- Website: gurpinar.bel.tr

Gürpınar (Kurdish: Payizawa/Xawesor, Armenian: Հայոց Ձոր, romanized: Hayots' Dzor) is a municipality and district of Van Province, Turkey. With an area of 4,028 km^{2} (1,555 sq mi), Gürpınar is the second-largest district of Turkey, after Karaman District. Its population is 31,865 (2022).

The town Gürpınar is located 20 km (12 mi) south of the provincial capital Van. The district has several places of historical interest. The current mayor is Hayrullah Tanış from the Justice and Development Party (AKP). The current kaymakam Fatih Sayar was appointed in August 2019.

== Name ==
The area's old Armenian name is Hayots Dzor (Armenian: Հայոց Ձոր, meaning "Valley of the Armenians"). Its Kurdish name is Payizava; however, the Armenian-derived Xawesor is also used. The titular village of Gürpınar itself was also known to Armenians as Kghzi (Armenian: Կղզի, meaning "island", due to it being surrounded by the Shamiram Canal).

== History ==
In Armenian mythology, Hayots Dzor is the valley where the Armenian progenitor Hayk defeated the army of the invading Babylonian king Bel and constructed a fortress (Haykaberd) nearby.

In the Middle Ages, the area was a part of the Armenian kingdom of Vaspurakan, ruled by the Artsruni dynasty of Armenian kings.

The village of Kghzi had 241 Armenian and 11 Kurdish inhabitants in 1909 (the wider region of Hayots Dzor was home to about 10,000 Armenians before the Armenian genocide). The Armenian population was massacred or displaced during the Armenian genocide; some of the inhabitants managed to flee and settle in Eastern Armenia.

== Historical places ==
- Hoşap Castle
- Çavuştepe, Urartian castle
- Surp Marinos Monastery
- Menua Canal

== Composition ==
There are 79 neighbourhoods in Gürpınar District:

- Akbulut
- Akdoğu
- Akpınar
- Alnıak
- Arındı
- Aşağı Kaymaz
- Bağrıyanık
- Beşbudak
- Bölmeçalı
- Bozyiğit
- Bükeç
- Çakınlı
- Çatakdibi
- Çavuştepe
- Çepkenli
- Cevizalan
- Çörekli
- Cumhuriyet
- Dağseven
- Değirmendüzü
- Dikbıyık
- Dolaylı
- Doluçıkın
- Elaçmaz
- Erkaldı
- Geçerli
- Geziyurt
- Giyimli
- Gölardı
- Güleçler
- Günbaşı
- Hacıköy
- Hoşab
- Işıkpınar
- Kalkanlı
- Kapçık
- Karakoç
- Kılıçtutan
- Kırkgeçit
- Koçgüden
- Koyunyatağı
- Kuşdağı
- Mollahüseyin
- Murataldı
- Oğuldamı
- Ongun
- Örmeli
- Ortaköy
- Otbiçer
- Öveçli
- Özlüce
- Parmakkapı
- Sakalar
- Sapakonak
- Savacık
- Sevindik
- Sıcaksu
- Sütlüce
- Taşdöndüren
- Taşlıyazı
- Tepegören
- Topçudeğirmeni
- Topsakal
- Topyıldız
- Tutak
- Tutmaç
- Üçdoğan
- Üçgen
- Umut
- Uzungedik
- Yalınca
- Yaramış
- Yatağan
- Yedisalkım
- Yolaşan
- Yoldüştü
- Yukarı Kaymaz
- Yurtbaşı
- Zernek
