= Hovhannes Zardaryan =

Soviet-Armenian painter

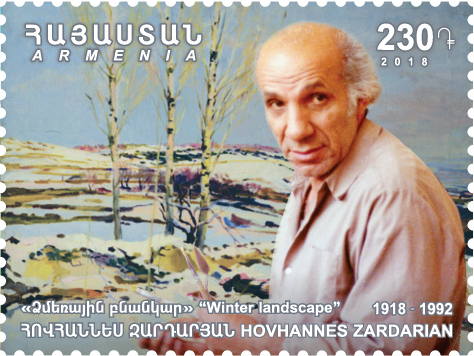
Zardaryan with his 1946 painting Winter landscape on a 2018 stamp of Armenia

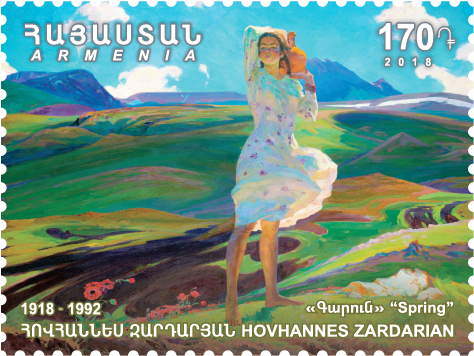
Spring (1956) by Zardaryan on a 2018 stamp of Armenia

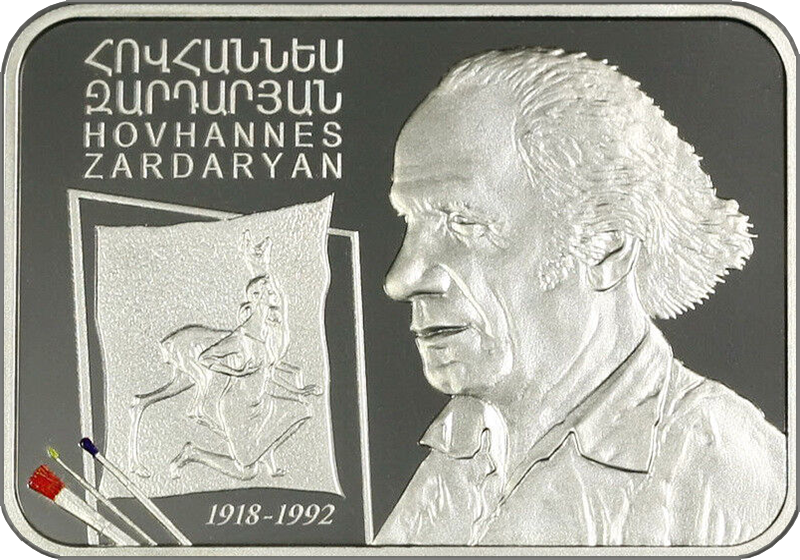
Zardaryan on a 2018 silver coin of Armenia

Hovhannes Zardaryan (Armenian: Հովհաննես Զարդարjան; 8 January 1918 – 21 July 1992) was a Soviet and Armenian painter.

== Biography ==
Hovhannes Zardaryan was born in the family of craftsman in Kars (now in Turkey). During the massif exodus following the Armenian genocide, Zardarians moved first to Armavir, Russia, then Krasnodar (Russia) and finally established in Tiflis (Georgia).

In 1933, after attending painting classes at the Art School of Tiflis, Zardaryan moved to Yerevan. He entered the Applied Arts School and graduated four years later from the studio of Sedrak Arakelian and Vahram Gaifejian. Through 1937 he continued his studies the Institute of Fine Arts and Architecture of the Russian Academy of Arts of Leningrad. By his return to Armenia in early 1941 Zardaryan was recognized as a promising young painter. He was exempted from military service during World War II and joined the Union of Artists of Armenia. He returned to Russia in 1944 with a series of still lives and Armenian landscapes that were selected for the exhibition of Armenian Art.

Back in Armenia Zardaryan collaborated with different artists on the State commanded large scale paintings. 1956 and 1958 he participated in international exhibitions in Prague and India as well as Biennale in Venice. His 1956 painting Spring won a silver medal at the Expo 58 in Brussels. It was featured on a 1974 stamp of the Soviet Union and on a 2018 stamp and a 2018 commemorative silver coin of Armenia. For many years the painting was exhibited at the Tretyakov Gallery.

Zardaryan established his studio near the Astrophysical Observatory of Burakan.

=== Timeline ===
- 1956 – Awarded the Order of the Red Banner of Labour
- 1959/1961 – Exhibitions in New York City, Mexico City, Havana, Cairo, Warsaw and Berlin.
- 1963 – Zardaryan is awarded the title of the People's Artist of Armenian SSR
- 1964 – Second participation in the Venice Biennale.
- 1969 – Zardarian becomes professor of the Yerevan Institute of Visual and Dramatic Arts
- 1971/1972 – Zardarian takes part in the exhibition "Armenian Art: From Urartu to Our Days" at the Louvre, Paris, and presents his exhibition in Tokyo.
- 1978 – awarded the Order of Friendship of Peoples
- 1986/1987 – Zardarian participates in the exhibition "Italy: As Armenian Artists see the Country", held in Venice.
- 1988 – Zardarian is elected the full member of the USSR Academy of Arts (since 1992 the Russian Academy of Arts).
- 1990 – Exhibition in Montreal (Canada).
