= Argišti I =

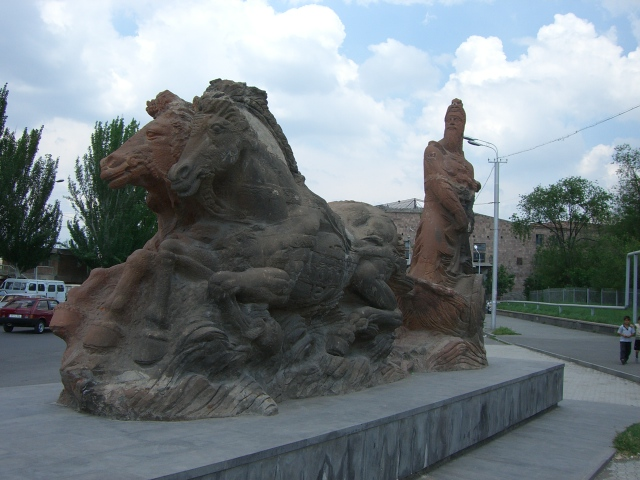
- Monument of Argišti in Yerevan, Armenia

King of Urartu
- Reign: 786–764 BC
- Predecessor: Menua
- Successor: Sarduri II
- Born: c. 827 BC
- Died: c. 764 BC
- Issue: Sarduri II
- Father: Menua
- Mother: Tariria

Argišti I, was the sixth known king of Urartu, reigning from 786 BC to 764 BC. He founded the citadel of Erebuni in 782 BC, which is the present capital of Armenia, Yerevan. Alternate transliterations of the name include Argishtis, Argisti, Argišti, and Argishtish. Although the name is usually rendered as Argišti (read: Argishti), some scholars argue that Argisti is the most likely pronunciation. This is due to the belief that the Urartians used the cuneiform symbol š to voice an s-sound, as opposed to representing the digraph sh.

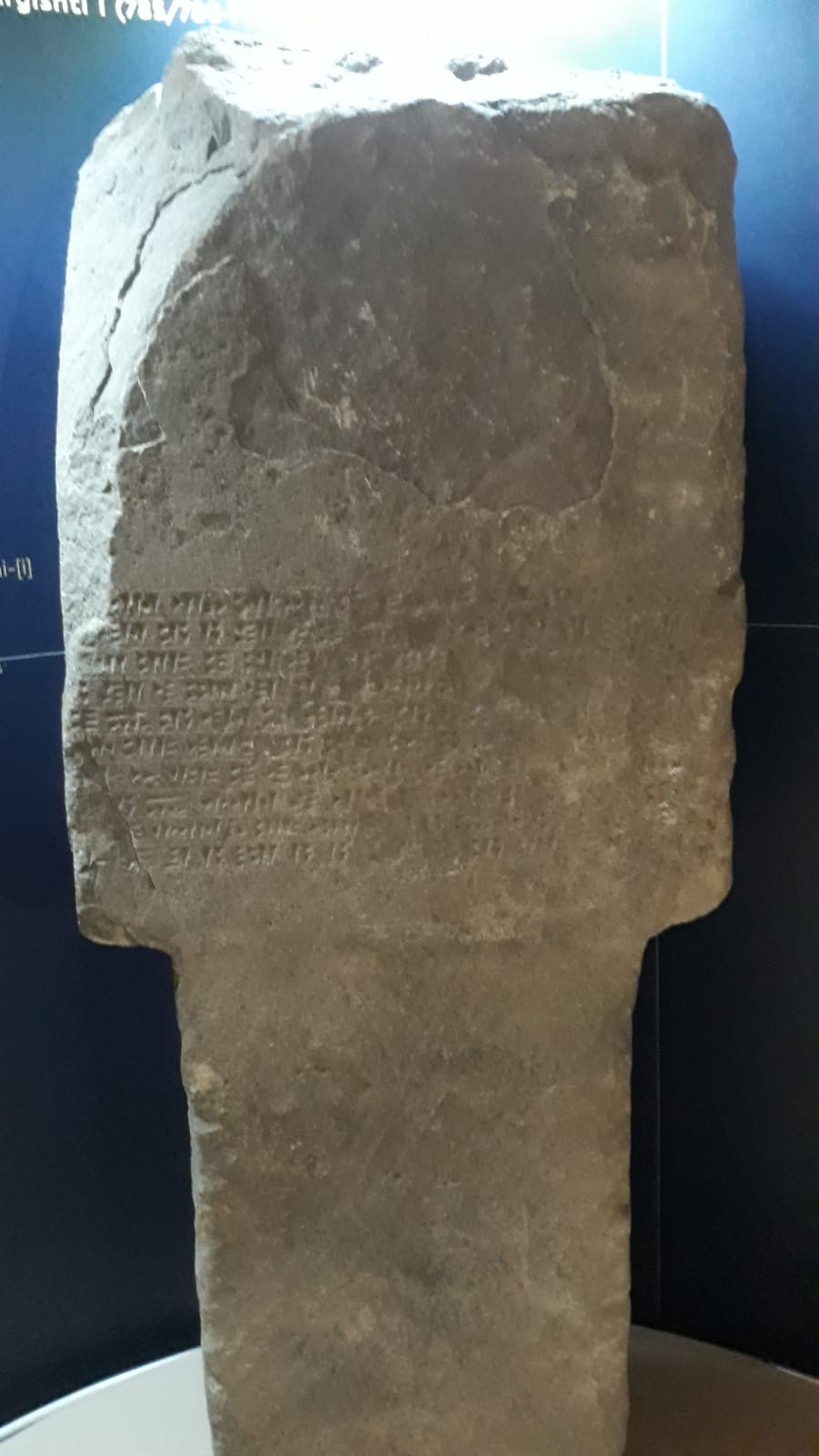
Stele with an inscription by Argišti I, known as the Arinçkus Argishti I Stele, Bitlis Ahlat Museum.

A son and the successor of Menua, he continued the series of conquests initiated by his predecessors, apparently campaigning every year of his reign. He was involved in a number of inconclusive conflicts with the Assyrian king Shalmaneser IV. He conquered the northern part of Syria and made Urartu the most powerful state in post-Hittite Asia Minor. He also expanded his kingdom north to Lake Sevan, conquering much of Diauehi and the Ararat Valley. After an uprising by the inhabitants of the newly conquered regions, Argišti deported them and repopulated the area with subjects from other parts of his empire. In those territories, Argišti built Erebuni Fortress in 782 BC, settling it with 6,600 prisoners of war from Hatti and Supani. He also founded the fortress of Argištiḫinili in 776 BC, on the site of Armavir, the first capital of the later Kingdom of Armenia. Inscriptions belonging to the Urartian king Argišti I were found in Kepenek Castle, located on a hill near Muş.

He was succeeded by his son Sarduri II.

Philologist Armen Petrosyan proposes an Indo-European etymology for the name Argišti, deriving it from the Proto-Indo-European root *h₂(e)rǵ-/arǵ- 'white bright', 'swift, fast', from which also Greek Ἀργηστής Argēstḗs 'white, bright' and 'quick'; this etymology was suggested by Robert Eisler. Petrosyan also considers possible a connection with Greek ἄριστος áristos 'best'.

== See also ==
- List of kings of Urartu
