= Tariria =

Tariria was an Urartian queen or princess of the 9th or 8th century BCE. She is associated with king Menua through inscriptions along the Menua Canal, where she owned land. However, it remains difficult to determine the precise nature of their relationship, whether she was the wife or the daughter of the king, although she seems more likely to have been his wife.

Along with queen Qaquli, she is one of the two known female members of the Urartian royal family.

== Biography ==
Tariria is primarily known from an inscription bearing her name, placed at the boundary of what appears to be her vineyard, along the Menua Canal. In reality, more than just a vineyard, her lands seem to be a vast royal garden modeled after the Assyrian style. This inscription states: "This vineyard belongs to Tariria, woman of Menua. It is called the vineyard of Tariria".

She is generally considered to be the wife of Menua, though she might be his daughter. Along with Queen Qaquli, she is one of the two known female members of the Urartian royal family.
