= Diauehi =

Iron Age tribal confederation in the Caucasus

Diauehi დიაოხი Diaokhi
- 12th century BC–8th century BCE
- Capital: Zua
- Common languages: Armenian language Kartvelian languages Hurrian language
- King
  - Approx. BC 1120 – BC 1100: Sien
  - Approx. BC 850 – BC 825: Asia
  - Approx. BC 810 – BC 770: Utupursi (last)
- History
  - Established: 12th century BC
  - Divided between Colchis (north part, province of "Hushani") and Urartu (south part): 8th century BCE
  - Disestablished: 8th century BCE
- Today part of: Turkey

Diauehi (Modern Georgian: დიაოხი Diaokhi, Urartian Diauehi, Greek Τάοχοι Taochoi, Armenian Տայք Tayk, possibly Assyrian Daiaeni) was a tribal union located in northeastern Anatolia, that was recorded in Assyrian and Urartian sources during the Iron Age. It is usually (though not always) identified with the earlier Daiaeni (Dayaeni), attested in the Yonjalu inscription of the Assyrian king Tiglath-Pileser I's third year (1118 BC) and in later records by Shalmaneser III (845 BC). While it is unknown what language(s) they spoke, they may have been speakers of a Kartvelian, Armenian, Iranian, or Hurrian language.

== Location ==
Although the exact geographic extent of Diauehi is still unclear, many scholars place it in the Pasinler Plain in today's northeastern Turkey, while others locate it in the Armenian–Georgian marchlands as it follows the Kura River. Most probably, the core of the Diauehi lands may have extended from the headwaters of the Euphrates into the river valleys of Çoruh to Oltu. The Urartian sources speak of Diauehi's three key cities—Zua, Utu and Sasilu; Zua is frequently identified with Zivin Kale and Utu is probably modern Oltu, while Sasilu is sometimes linked to the early medieval Georgian toponym Sasire, near Tortomi (present-day Tortum, Turkey). The Diaeuhian city Šešetina may have corresponded to Şavşat, Turkey (Shavsheti in Georgian).

== History ==
=== Late Bronze Age ===
The region of Diauehi seems to have roughly corresponded to, or bordered, the previous Hayasa-Azzi territory.

=== Iron Age ===
In the early 8th century, Diauehi became the target of the newly emerged regional power of Urartu. Menua (810–785 BC) conquered part of Diaeuhi, annexing its most important cities: Zua, Utu, and Shashilu, and forcing the king of Diauehi, Utupursi(ni), to pay a tribute of gold and silver.

==== Urartu period ====
Menua's son Argishti I (785–763 BC), campaigned against the Diauehi kingdom in 783. Argishti I defeated King Utupursi, annexing his possessions. In exchange for his life, Utupursi was forced to pay a tribute including a variety of metals and livestock. Toward the end of his reign, Argishti I led yet another campaign against Utuspursi, who led a rebellion against the Urartians.

== Possible ethno-linguistic identification ==
Diauehi is considered by some as a locus of Proto-Kartvelian; it has been described as an "important tribal formation of possible proto-Georgians" by Ronald Grigor Suny (1994).

According to Robert H. Hewsen, they may have been speakers of a language unrelated to any other in the Caucasus region.

However, they are mentioned by Diodorus Siculus as Xaoi, which Hewsen etymologizes as a Greek form of the Armenian endonym, Hayk'.

Massimo Forlanini proposed a connection between the name of the Diaeuhi tribe, Baltu, and the Hayasan deity, Baltaik. He also compared these to the name of the Hayasan mercenary, Waltahi.

== Connection to Daiaeni (Dayaeni) ==
Some scholars have linked the Diaeuhi to the Bronze Age Daiaeni (Dayaeni) tribe, mentioned in 12th century BC Assyrian sources as being part of the Nairi confederation. This connection is mainly due to the phonetic similarities of the names Daiaeni and Diaeuhi.

The Daiaeni were powerful enough to counter the Assyrian forays, although in 1112 BC their king, Sien, was defeated by Tiglath-Pileser I. Sien was captured and later released on terms of vassalage.

Daiaeni appeared again in Assyrian texts nearly three centuries later when King Asia of Daiaeni (850–825 BC) was forced to submit to the Assyrian king Shalmaneser III in 845 BC, after the latter had overrun Urartu and made a foray into Daiaeni.

As the Daiaeni of Assyrian records seem to have been located further south than the Diaeuhi of Urartian records, Robert H. Hewsen and Nicholas Adontz proposed that the Diaieni originally inhabited a region between Palu and either Mush Province or Lake Van. They then moved north to Kars Province, where they battled the Urartians and later encountered Greek mercenaries, including Xenophon. They subsequently moved further northwest.

Archibald Sayce suggested that Daiaeni was named after an eponymous founder, Diaus, and thus meant "people of the land/tribe of Diau(s)".

== Onomastics ==
=== Daiaeni rulers ===
- Diau(s) (possible founder/patriarch suggested by Archibald Sayce)
- Sien
- Asia

=== Diauehi rulers ===
- Utupursi(ni)

=== Diauehi tribes ===
- Ardaraki
- Baltu
- Kabili
- Šaški

=== Diauehi districts ===
- Kada
- Ašqalaši

=== Diauehi cities ===
- Šašilu
- Utuha
- Zua
- Ḫaldiriluḫi

== See also ==
- List of ancient kingdoms of Anatolia
- Urartu
- Nairi
- Hayasa-Azzi
- Colchis

== Explanatory notes ==
1. first mention of the Daiaeni tribe, who some scholars link to later Diaeuhi
