= Tosb =

District of Armenia

Tosp (Տոսպ in Armenian) is a district of Vaspurakan province of Historical Armenia.

The name came from the name Tushpa known as the capital of Araratian Kingdom aka Urartu. Tushpa was a name of Van city, and district called as Biaina or Biainili in the Urartu period, but after the Urartu gave the way to the Armenian Yervanduni Kingdom the district's name and the name of the city changed over. Biayna transformed to Van (city) and Tushpa to Tosp (district).

Tosp's lands were an indivisible part of Armenian culture and Armenian ethnicity since the Urartu era to the 1915-1923 Armenian genocide.
