= Menua Canal =

Ancient canal in modern Turkey

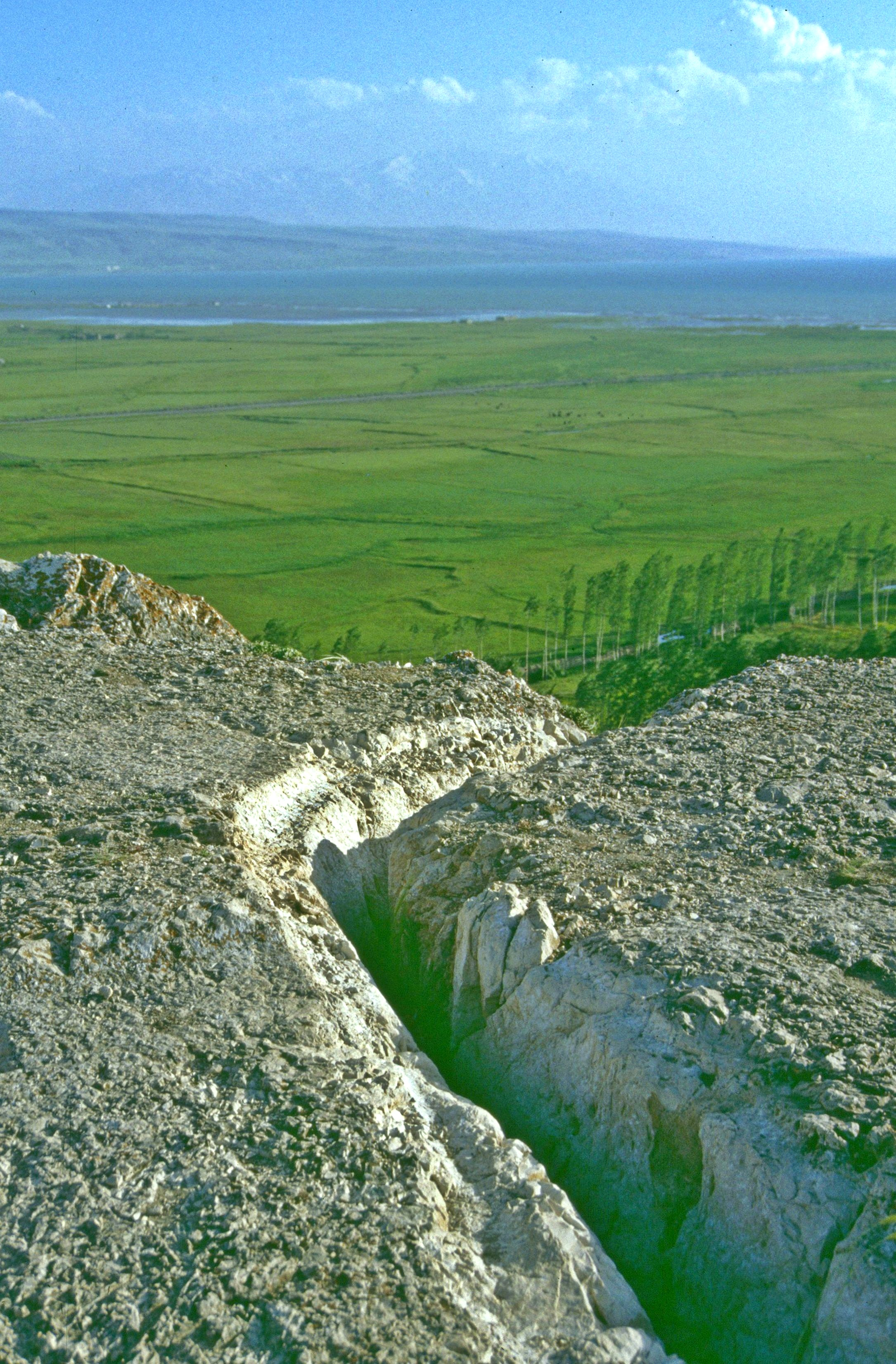
Menua Canal

The Menua Canal, also known as the Semiramis Canal or as the Shamiram Canal, is a canal joined with a series of hydraulic works such as aqueducts constructed by King Menua of Urartu (r. 810–786 BC). It is located to the east of Van, Turkey and runs 56 kilometres (35 mi), supplying a large region and flowing into Lake Van. It has been continuously used by the local inhabitants for irrigation purposes up to this day, more than 2500 years after its construction. It is considered a masterpiece of hydraulic and architectural engineering by regional and global standards.

Despite the fact that this canal stands out for its technicality and the importance of the works undertaken to complete it, it was part of a larger policy of hydraulic constructions carried out by the Urartian rulers aimed at ensuring adequate water supply in the region. It is believed to have provided sustenance for up to 50,000 people in the capital of Tushpa (Van) alone.

Although it was thought to be from Assyrian mythical queen Semiramis by medieval historians, who remembered it from a legendary past, it was built by the Urartian King Menua, according to Urartian inscriptions found in some of the structures. These fourteen inscriptions serve as valuable resources for researchers translating Urartian.

== History ==
=== Background ===
The construction of the Menua Canal seems to have occurred parallel to the introduction of the qanat system to Urartu from neighboring Persia. This method, using underground canals, revolutionized the hydraulic and architectural practices in the region. Later, one of Menua's descendants, Rusa II, added an artificial lake, Lake Rusa (now known as Lake Kechich), to the hydraulic works. King Menua (r. 810–786 BC) is known for other hydraulic works, including approximately five smaller canals in the region and towards Manazkert, of which he may have been the founder.

The reasons for erecting such a significant structure are still not well known, but political motives aimed at gaining the approval of his subjects by portraying himself as a benevolent and magnanimous king cannot be ruled out.

=== Construction ===
King Menua of Urartu built the canal, according to his inscriptions, which are still visible by the canal. It brought fresh water to the capital city of Tushpa. This canal was part of a broader set of pipelines and structures aimed at improving irrigation in the Armenian highlands during the Kingdom of Urartu's time. It extends over a length of 56 kilometres (35 mi). Until its first restoration in 1956, the canal typically provided between two and three cubic metres per second (71 and 106 cu ft/s). During the dry season, it could decrease to 1.5 cubic metres per second (53 cu ft/s). In certain areas, it included retaining walls that were approximately eleven metres (36 ft) high; they were used to facilitate terrace farming and irrigation. For example, it appears that Menua's wife or daughter owned vineyards on a terrace adjacent to the canal. An inscription found on this land declares, "This vineyard belongs to Tariria, the woman of Menua. It is called Tariria's vineyard." Dams were also built along the canal's route to control the water supply to the region. It is believed to have provided sustenance for up to 50,000 people in the capital of Tushpa (Van) alone.

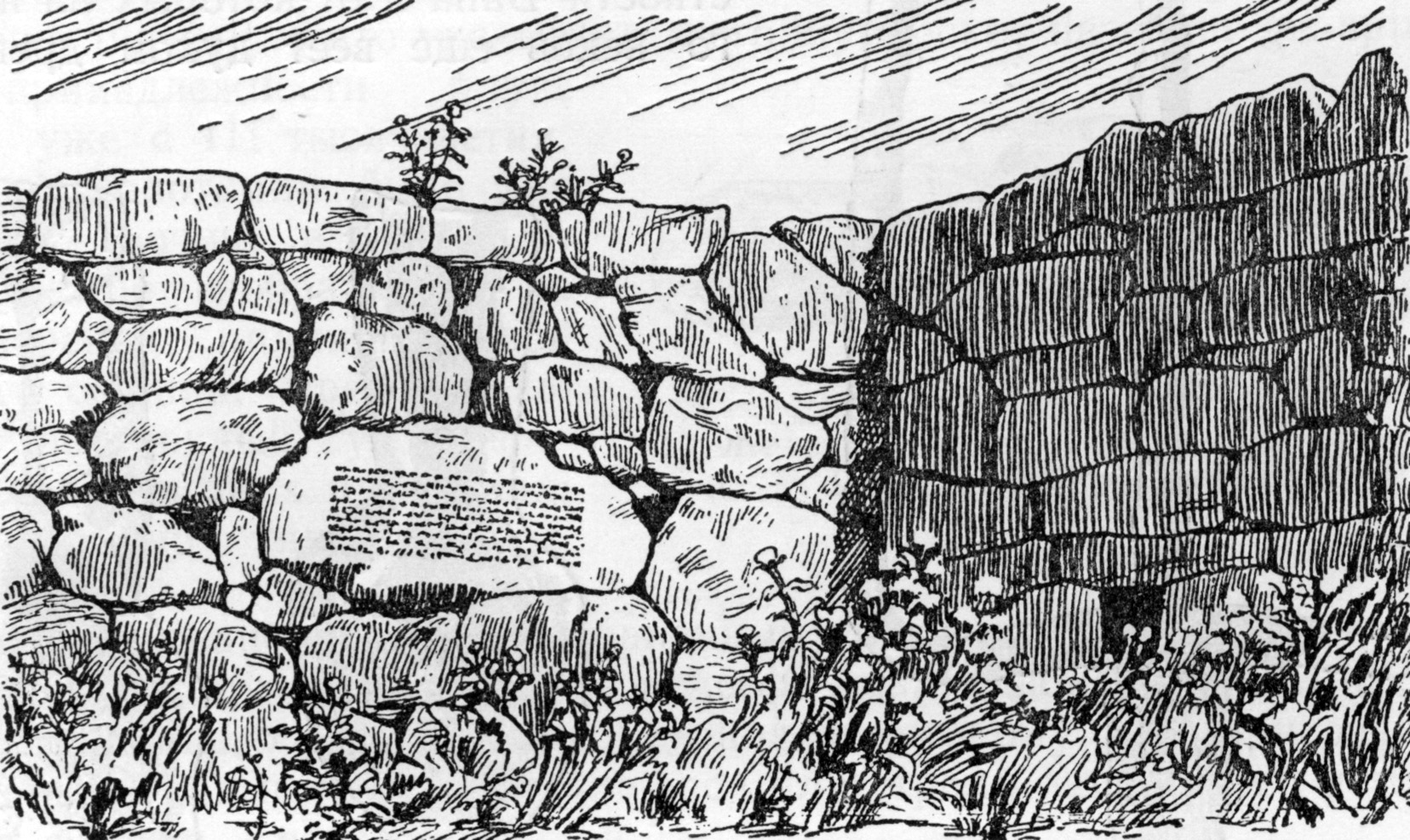
Drawing of a wall of the canal with a Urartian inscription when it was first found.

Along the course of the canal, particularly in the most challenging construction areas, there are inscriptions in Urartian cuneiform. There are a total of fourteen inscriptions, all of which celebrate the patron of the project, King Menua. Some of these inscriptions contain curse formulas, while others do not. The length of the inscriptions varies according to the difficulty of the technical work involved.

The most complete Urartian inscription found along the canal is located near a section where an aqueduct was built by the king. It includes a curse formula against anyone who would desecrate the structure and declares:

By the will of Khaldi, Menua, son of Ishpuini, has built this canal. This canal is named Menua Canal. Menua the powerful, the great king, King of Biaina, Prince of the city of Tushpa; Menua speaks in the name of the dread Khaldi: Whosoever damages this inscription, whosoever overturns it, whosoever does such things according to his own desire or in the name of another, Menua warns that the dread god Khaldi, the god Teisheba and the Sun god Sivini will efface him from the sign of the sun.

Although the structures were Urartian and originally bore the title "Menua's Canal," the canal was called the "Semiramis Canal" by the medieval Armenian historian Moses of Khorene, who attributed its construction to the legendary Assyrian queen Semiramis. Moses writes:

"She said, 'We must, in a country with such temperate climate and pure water, establish a city, a royal residence to dwell in Armenia, amidst all delights, one-fourth of the year; the other three colder seasons, we will spend in Nineveh.' [...] Semiramis first had the river embankment constructed, using blocks of rocks bound together with lime and fine sand, a colossal work in terms of its extent and height, which, it is said, still exists to this day. [...] Distributing a portion of the river's waters throughout the city, she brings them wherever they are needed, including for the watering of gardens and flowerbeds."

Banister Fletcher wrote about it in his History of Architecture:

The Shamiram Su (Semiramis Canal) is the most famous of the canals and cisterns which formed a major part of the works of the successive Urartian kings, and was constructed by Menua to bring water from the valley of the Hosap river south-east of Van to the fields and gardens round the capital. This canal is largely visible to this day.

== Posterity ==
The inscriptions found along the canal have been significant in the understanding of the Urartian language, while also providing researchers with information about the actual sponsor of the construction. Thanks to the discovery of retaining walls, it is possible to reconstruct the original course of the canal with a relatively high level of accuracy.

The canal is still in use and underwent its first restoration in 1956, approximately 2500 years after its construction. This restoration undertaken by Turkey, however, replaced its central part, including one aqueduct, with a modern concrete construction, as the old structure was too expensive to maintain.

It is considered a masterpiece of Anatolian and global hydraulic and architectural engineering. Nicolas Adontz wrote of the canal: "The pili of Menua - the Shamiram canal - compared to all known canals [of the period], appears as an Euphrates. In other words, Menua's canal among canals is like the Euphrates among rivers."
