= Urartu =

Iron-Age kingdom of the ancient Near East

Coordinates: 38°30′00″N 43°20′33″E

Kingdom of Urartu 𒌑𒊏𒅈𒂅 assyrian Ú-ra-ar-ṭu(exonym) (Note: See names and etymology.) Biainili 𒆳𒁉𒀀𒄿𒉌𒇷
- 860 BC – 590 BC/547 BC
- Urartu under Sarduri II, 743 BC
- Capital: Sugunia; Arzashkun; Tushpa (after 832 BC)
- Common languages: Akkadian; Urartian; Proto-Armenian
- Religion: Urartian polytheism
- Government: Monarchy
  - 858–844: Arame
  - 844–834(?): Lutipri(?)
  - 834–828: Sarduri I
  - 828–810: Ishpuini
  - 810–785: Menua
  - 785–753: Argishti I
  - 753–735: Sarduri II
  - 735–714: Rusa I
  - 714–680: Argishti II
  - 680–639: Rusa II
  - 639–635: Sarduri III
  - 629–590 or 629–615: Rusa III
  - 615–595: Sarduri IV
  - 590–585: Rusa IV
- Historical era: Iron Age
  - Established: 860 BC
  - Median conquest (or Achaemenid conquest in 547): 590 BC/547 BC
Preceded by
Nairi
Diauehi
Succeeded by
Median Empire
Achaemenid Empire
Satrapy of Armenia

Urartu (Note: /ʊˈrɑːrtuː/; Urartian: 𒆳𒁉𒀀𒄿𒉌𒇷, ^{KUR}bi-a-i-ni-li; Armenian: Ուրարտու; Assyrian: māt Urarṭu, Babylonian: Urashtu, Hebrew: אֲרָרָט, Ararat) was an ancient civilization and Iron Age kingdom centered on the Armenian highlands between Lake Van, Lake Urmia, and Lake Sevan. The territory of the ancient kingdom of Urartu extended over the modern frontiers of Turkey, Iran, Iraq, and Armenia. Its kings left behind cuneiform inscriptions in the Urartian language, a member of the Hurro-Urartian language family.

The kingdom emerged in the mid-9th century BC and dominated the Armenian highlands in the 8th and 7th centuries BC. Urartu frequently warred with Assyria and became, for a time, the most powerful state in the Near East. Weakened by constant conflict, it was eventually conquered, either by the Iranian Medes in the early 6th century BC or by Cyrus the Great in the middle of the 6th century BC. Archaeologically, it is noted for its large fortresses and sophisticated metalwork.

== Names and etymology ==
Various names were given to the geographic region and the polity that emerged in the region.

- Urartu/Ararat: The name Urartu (Armenian: Ուրարտու; Assyrian: māt Urarṭu 𒌑𒊏𒅈𒂅 (Ú-ra-ar-ṭu); Babylonian: Urashtu 𒌑𒊏𒀸𒌅 (ú-ra-aš-tu); Hebrew: אֲרָרָט ʾĂrārāṭ) comes from Assyrian sources. Shalmaneser I (1263–1234 BC) recorded a campaign in which he subdued the entire territory of "Uruatri". The Shalmaneser text uses the name Urartu to refer to a geographical region, not a kingdom, and names eight "lands" contained within Urartu (which at the time of the campaign were still disunited). The Assyrian Uruatri seems to correspond with the Azzi of contemporaneous Hittite texts. Urartu is cognate with the Biblical Ararat, Akkadian Urashtu, and Armenian Ayrarat. In addition to referring to the famous Biblical highlands, Ararat also appears as the name of a kingdom in Jeremiah 51:27, mentioned together with Minni and Ashkenaz. Mount Ararat is located approximately 120 kilometres (75 mi) north of the kingdom's former capital, though the identification of the biblical "mountains of Ararat" with the Mt. Ararat is a modern identification based on postbiblical tradition.
- Biainili/Biaini: The Urartian kings, starting during the co-reign of Ishpuini and his son, Menua, referred to their kingdom as Biainili, or "those of the land of Bia" (sometimes transliterated as Biai or Bias). Whoever or whatever "Bia" was remains unclear. It is not to be confused with the nearby land "Biane", which likely became the Armenian Basean (Greek: Phasiane).
- Kingdom of Van (Armenian: Վանի թագավորութիւն, romanized: Vani t′agavorut′yun): A widespread belief is that the Urartian toponym Biainili (or Biaineli), which was possibly pronounced as Vanele (or Vanili), became Van (Վան) in Old Armenian. The names "Kingdom of Van" and "Vannic Kingdom" were applied to Urartu as a result of this theory and the fact that the Urartian capital, Tushpa, was located near the city of Van and the lake of the same name.
- Nairi: Boris Piotrovsky wrote that the Urarteans first appear in history in the 13th century BC as a league of tribes or countries which did not yet constitute a unitary state. In the Assyrian annals the term Uruatri (Urartu) as a name for this league was superseded during a considerable period of years by the term "land of Nairi". More recent scholarship suggests that Uruatri was a district of Nairi, and perhaps corresponded to the Azzi of contemporaneous Hittite texts. Although early rulers of the Kingdom of Urartu referred to their domain as "Nairi" (instead of the later Biainili), some scholars believe that Urartu and Nairi were separate polities. The Assyrians seem to have continued to refer to Nairi as a distinct entity for decades after the establishment of Urartu until Nairi was totally absorbed by Assyria and Urartu in the 8th century BC.
- Khaldini: Carl Ferdinand Friedrich Lehmann-Haupt (1910) believed that the people of Urartu called themselves Khaldini after the god Ḫaldi. This theory has been overwhelmingly rejected by modern scholars.
- Shurili: Linguists John Greppin and Igor M. Diakonoff argued that the Urartians referred to themselves as Shurele (sometimes transliterated as Shurili or Šurili, possibly pronounced as Surili), a name mentioned within the royal titles of the kings of Urartu (e.g. "the king of Šuri-lands"). The word Šuri has been variously theorized as originally referring to chariots, lances or swords (perhaps related to the Armenian word sur (սուր) meaning "sword"). Others have connected Shurili to an as yet undetermined geographical region, such as Shupria (perhaps an attempt by the ruling dynasty to associate themselves with the Hurrians), Cappadocia, the Ararat plain, or the entire world.
- Armenia: In the late 6th–early 5th century BC, with the emergence of the Satrapy of Armenia in the region, Urartu (Urashtu in Babylonian) was used as a synonym for Armenia (Old Persian Armina) in the trilingual Behistun Inscription. The name Ararat was translated as Armenia in the 1st century AD in historiographical works and very early Latin translations of the Bible, as well as the Books of Kings and Isaiah in the Septuagint. Some English language translations, including the King James Version, follow the Septuagint translation of Ararat as Armenia. Shupria (Akkadian: Armani-Subartu from the 3rd millennium BC) is believed to have originally been a Hurrian or Mitanni state that was subsequently annexed into the Urartian confederation. Shupria is often mentioned in conjunction with a district in the area called Arme or Armani and the nearby districts of Urme and Inner Urumu. It is possible that the name Armenia originates in Armini, Urartian for "inhabitant of Arme" or "Armean country". The Arme tribe of Urartian texts may have been the Urumu, who in the 12th century BC attempted to invade Assyria from the north with their allies the Mushki and the Kaskians. The Urumu apparently settled in the vicinity of Sason, lending their name to the regions of Arme and the nearby Urme and Inner Urumu.

== History ==
=== Origins ===
Urartu under Arame of Urartu, 860–840 BC

Assyrian inscriptions of Shalmaneser I (c. 1274 BC) first mention Uruatri as one of the states of Nairi, a loose confederation of smaller kingdoms and tribal states in the Armenian Highlands in the thirteenth to eleventh centuries BC which he conquered. Uruartri itself was in the region around Lake Van. The Nairi states were repeatedly subjected to further attacks and invasions by the Middle and Neo-Assyrian Empires, which lay to the south in Upper Mesopotamia ("the Jazirah") and northern Syria, especially under Tukulti-Ninurta I (c. 1240 BC), Tiglath-Pileser I (c. 1100 BC), Ashur-bel-kala (c. 1070 BC), Adad-nirari II (c. 900 BC), Tukulti-Ninurta II (c. 890 BC), and Ashurnasirpal II (883–859 BC).

Urartu reemerged in Assyrian language inscriptions in the ninth century BC as a powerful northern rival to the Neo-Assyrian Empire. The Nairi states and tribes became a unified kingdom under King Arame of Urartu (c. 860–843 BC), whose capitals, first at Sugunia and then at Arzashkun, were captured by the Assyrians under the Neo-Assyrian emperor Shalmaneser III.

Urartologist Paul Zimansky speculated that the Urartians, or at least their ruling family after Arame, may have emigrated northwest into the Lake Van region from their religious capital of Musasir. According to Zimansky, the Urartian ruling class were few in number and governed over an ethnically, culturally, and linguistically diverse population. Zimansky went so far as to suggest that the kings of Urartu might have come from various ethnic backgrounds themselves.

=== Growth ===
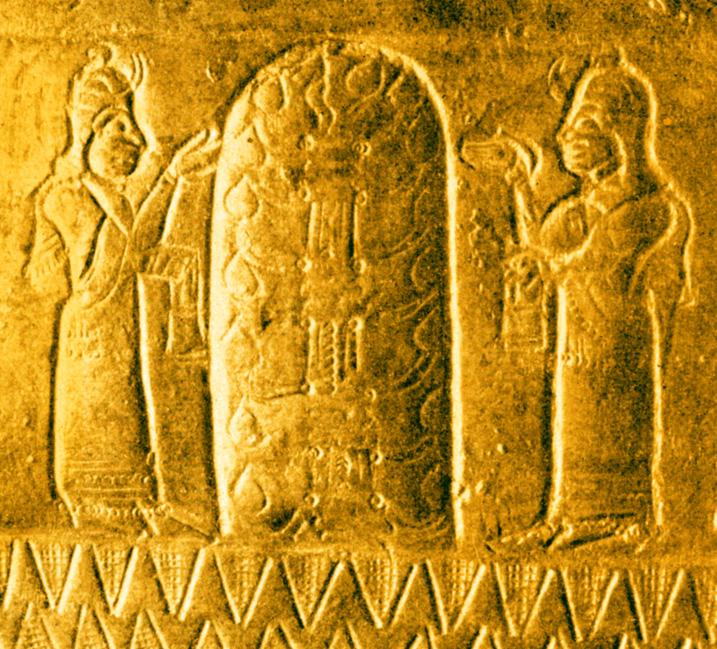
Fragment of a bronze helmet from Argishti I's era. The "tree of life", popular among the ancient societies, is depicted. The helmet was discovered during the excavations of the fortress of Teyshebaini on Karmir-Blur (Red Hill).

Assyria fell into a period of temporary stagnation for decades during the first half of the 9th century BC, which had aided Urartu's growth. Within a short time it became one of the largest and most powerful states in the Near East.

Sarduri I (c. 832–820 BC), the son of Lutipri, established a new dynasty and successfully resisted Assyrian attacks from the south led by Shalmaneser III, consolidated the military power of the state, and moved the capital to Tushpa (modern Van, Turkey, on the shore of Lake Van). His son, Ispuini (c. 820–800 BC) annexed the neighbouring state of Musasir, which became an important religious centre of the Urartian Kingdom, and introduced the cult of Ḫaldi.

Ispuini was also the first Urartian king to write in the Urartian language (previous kings left records written in Akkadian). He made his son Sarduri II viceroy. After conquering Musasir, Ispuini was in turn attacked by Shamshi-Adad V. His co-regent and subsequent successor, Menua (c. 800–785 BC) also enlarged the kingdom greatly and left inscriptions over a wide area. During Ispuini's and Menua's joint rule, they shifted from referring to their territory as Nairi, instead opting for Bianili.

Urartu reached the highest point of its military might under Menua's son Argishti I (c. 785–760 BC), becoming one of the most powerful kingdoms of ancient Near East. Argishti I added more territories along the Aras and Lake Sevan, and frustrated Shalmaneser IV's campaigns against him. Argishti also founded several new cities, most notably Erebuni Fortress in 782 BC. 6600 prisoners of war from Hatti and Supani were settled in the new city.

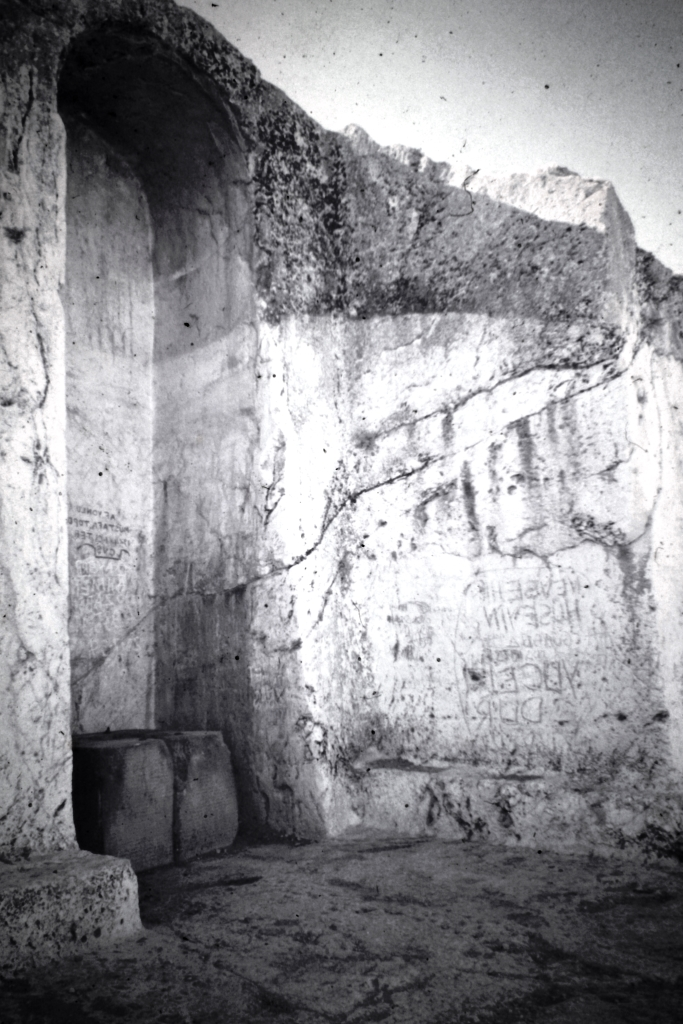
Niche and base for a destroyed Urartian stele, Van citadel, 1973

At its height, the Urartu kingdom stretched north beyond the Aras and Lake Sevan, encompassing present-day Armenia and even the southern part of present-day Georgia almost to the shores of the Black Sea; west to the sources of the Euphrates; east to present-day Tabriz, Lake Urmia, and beyond; and south to the sources of the Tigris.

Tiglath-Pileser III of Assyria defeated Sarduri II of Urartu in the first year of his reign (745 BC). There the Assyrians found horsemen and horses, tamed as colts for riding, that were unequalled in the south, where they were harnessed to Assyrian war-chariots.

=== Decline and recuperation ===
In 714 BC, the Urartian kingdom suffered heavily from Cimmerian raids and the campaigns of Sargon II. The main temple at Musasir was sacked, and the Urartian king Rusa I was crushingly defeated by Sargon II at Mount Waush. He subsequently committed suicide in shame.

Rusa's son Argishti II (714–685 BC) restored Urartu's position against the Cimmerians, however it was no longer a threat to Assyria and peace was made with the new king of Assyria Sennacherib in 705 BC. This, in turn, helped Urartu enter a long period of development and prosperity, which continued through the reign of Argishti's son Rusa II (685–645 BC).

After Rusa II, however, Urartu grew weaker under constant attacks from Cimmerian and Scythian invaders. As a result, it became dependent on Assyria, as evidenced by Rusa II's son Sarduri III (645–635 BC) referring to the Assyrian king Ashurbanipal as his "father".

=== Fall ===
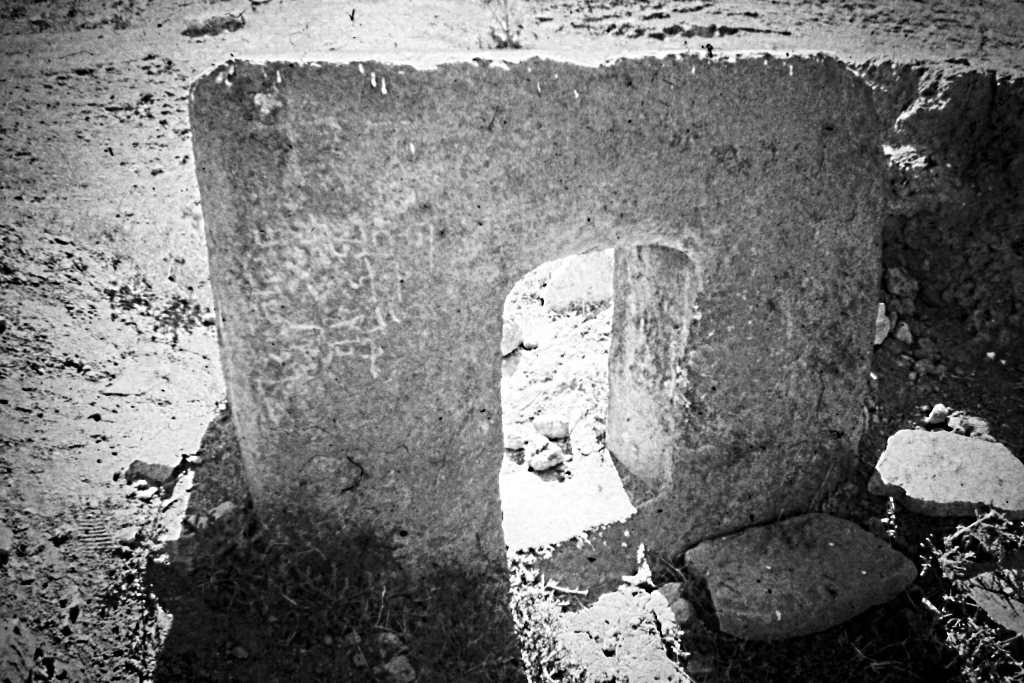
Urartian stone arch near Van, 1973.

According to Urartian epigraphy, Sarduri III was followed by two kings—Rusa III (also known as Rusa Erimenahi) (620–609 BC) and his son, Rusa IV (609–590 or 585 BC). There is speculation that Rusa III's father, Erimena, may have been a king as well, possibly ruling from 635 to 620 BC, but little is known about him. It is possible that Rusa III established a new dynasty and that his father, Erimena, had not been king.

Late during the 7th century BC (during or after Sarduri III's reign), Urartu was invaded by Scythians and their allies—the Medes. In 612 BC, the Median king Cyaxares the Great together with Nabopolassar of Babylon and the Scythians conquered Assyria after it had been irreversibly weakened by civil war. The Medes then took over the Urartian capital of Van in 590 BC, effectively ending the sovereignty of Urartu. However, some historians believe that Urartu survived until the middle of the 6th century BC and was eventually destroyed by Cyrus the Great. Many Urartian ruins of the period show evidence of destruction by fire.

=== Appearance of Armenia ===
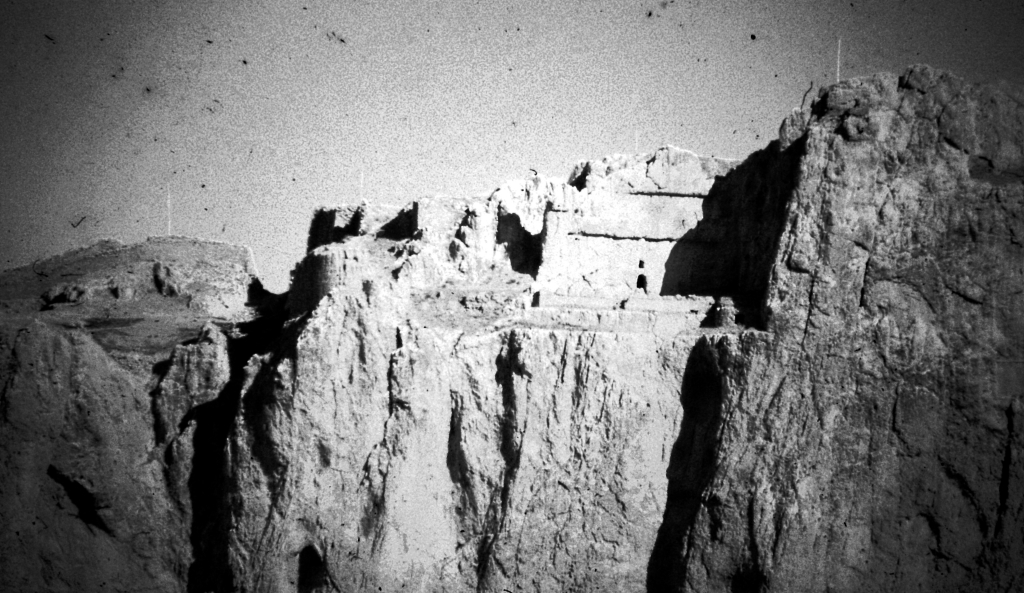
Urartian tomb complex, Van citadel, 1973

The Kingdom of Van was destroyed in 590 BC and by the late 6th century, the Satrapy of Armenia had replaced it. Little is known of what happened in the region between the fall of the Kingdom of Van and the appearance of the Satrapy of Armenia. According to historian Touraj Daryaee, during the Armenian rebellion against the Persian king Darius I in 521 BC, some of the personal and topographic names attested in connection with Armenia or Armenians were of Urartian origin, suggesting that Urartian elements persisted within Armenia after its fall. The Behistun Inscription (c. 522 BC) refers to Armenia and Armenians as synonyms of Urartu and Urartians. The toponym Urartu did not disappear, however, as the name of the province of Ayrarat in the center of the Kingdom of Armenia is believed to be its continuum.

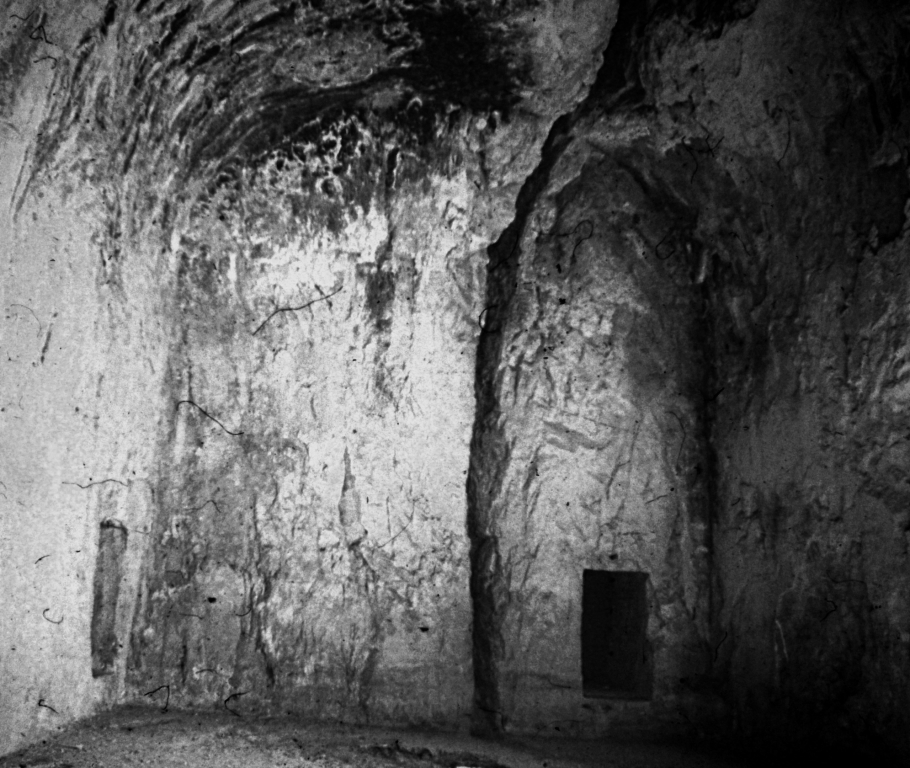
Urartian royal tomb. Van citadel, 1973

As the Armenian identity developed in the region, the memory of Urartu faded and disappeared. Parts of its history passed down as popular stories and were preserved in Armenia, as written by Movses Khorenatsi in the form of garbled legends in his 5th century book History of Armenia, where he speaks of a first Armenian Kingdom in Van which fought wars against the Assyrians. Khorenatsi's stories of these wars with Assyria would help in the rediscovery of Urartu.

According to Herodotus, the Alarodians (Alarodioi) were part of the 18th Satrapy of the Achaemenid Empire and formed a special contingent in the grand army of Xerxes I. Some scholars have tried to link the Alarodians to Urartians, suggesting that Alarodian was a variation of the name Urartian/Araratian. According to this theory, the Urartians of the 18th Satrapy were subsequently absorbed into the Armenian nation. Modern historians, however, have cast doubt on the Alarodian connection to the Urartians.

In a study published in 2017, the complete mitochondrial genomes of four ancient skeletons from Urartu were analyzed alongside other ancient populations found in modern-day Armenia and Artsakh spanning 7,800 years. The study shows that modern-day Armenians are the people who have the least genetic distance from those ancient skeletons. As well, some scholars asserted that the Urartians are the most easily identifiable ancestors of the Armenians.

Since its re-discovery in the 19th century, Urartu, which is commonly believed to have been at least partially Armenian-speaking, has played a significant role in Armenian nationalism.

== Geography ==
Urartu 715–713 BC

Urartu comprised an area of approximately 200,000 square miles (520,000 km^{2}), extending from the Euphrates in the West to Lake Urmia in the East and from the Caucasus Mountains south towards the Zagros Mountains in northern Iraq. More specifically, Urartu was an area directly surrounded by the mountain chains of the eastern Pontus at the north, the Lesser Caucasus at to the northeast, and the Taurus mountains at the south. It was centred around Lake Van, which is located in present-day eastern Anatolia.

At its apogee, Urartu stretched from the borders of northern Mesopotamia to the southern Caucasus, including present-day Turkey, Nakhchivan, Armenia and southern Georgia (up to the river Kura). The Taurus mountains also served as a natural barrier against southern threats, particularly from the Assyrians. Archaeological sites within its boundaries include Altintepe, Toprakkale, Patnos and Haykaberd. Urartu fortresses included Erebuni Fortress (present-day Yerevan), Van Fortress, Argishtihinili, Anzaf, Haykaberd, and Başkale, as well as Teishebaini (Karmir Blur, Red Mound) and others.

=== Checkpoints ===
Kayalıdere Castle is one of the important centers that enabled the Urartian kingdom to control the surrounding regions from Lake Van to the west.

== Discovery ==
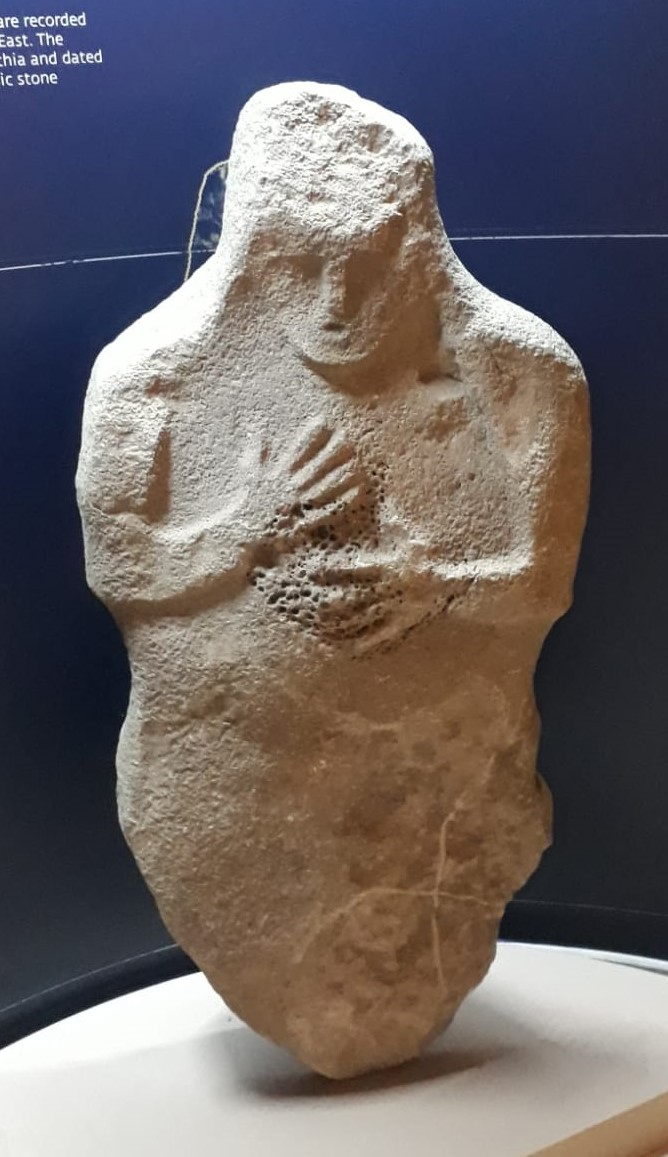
A Urartian Bulanık Stele, Bitlis Ahlat Museum

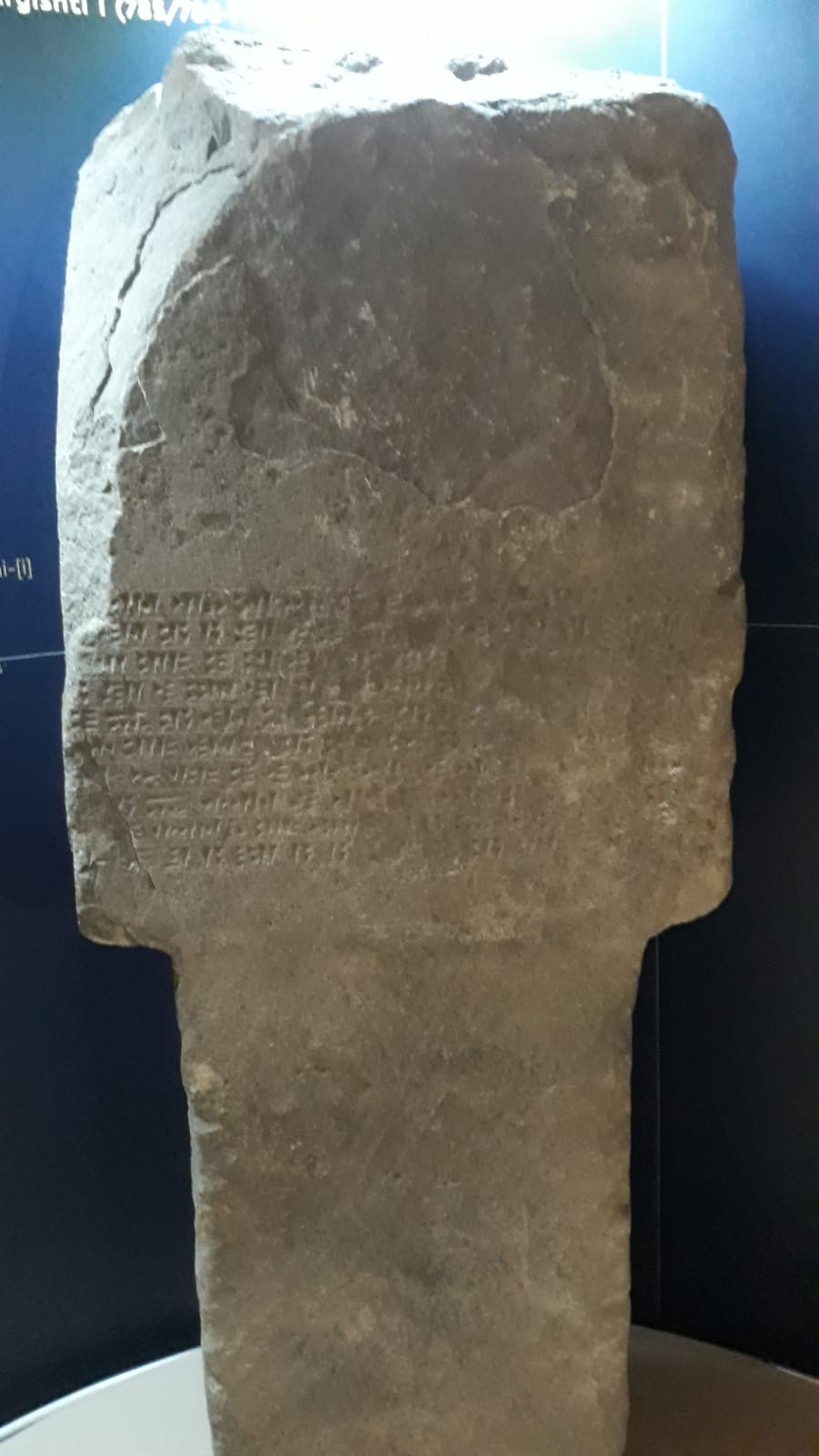
Arinçkus Argishti I Stele belonging to the Urartian King Argishti I, dated between 785 BC and 756 BC, Bitlis Ahlat Museum

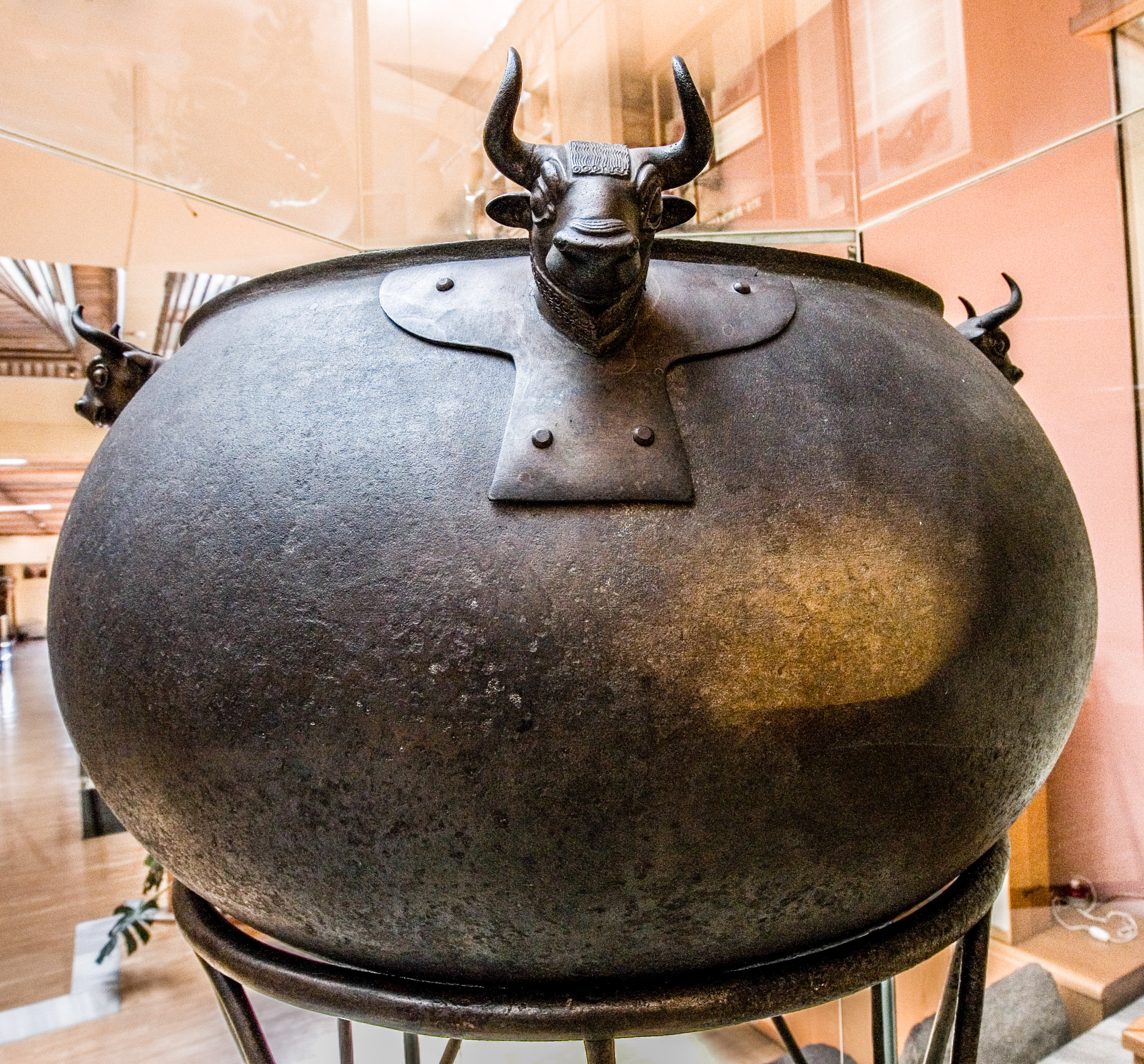
A Urartian cauldron, in the Museum of Anatolian Civilizations, Ankara

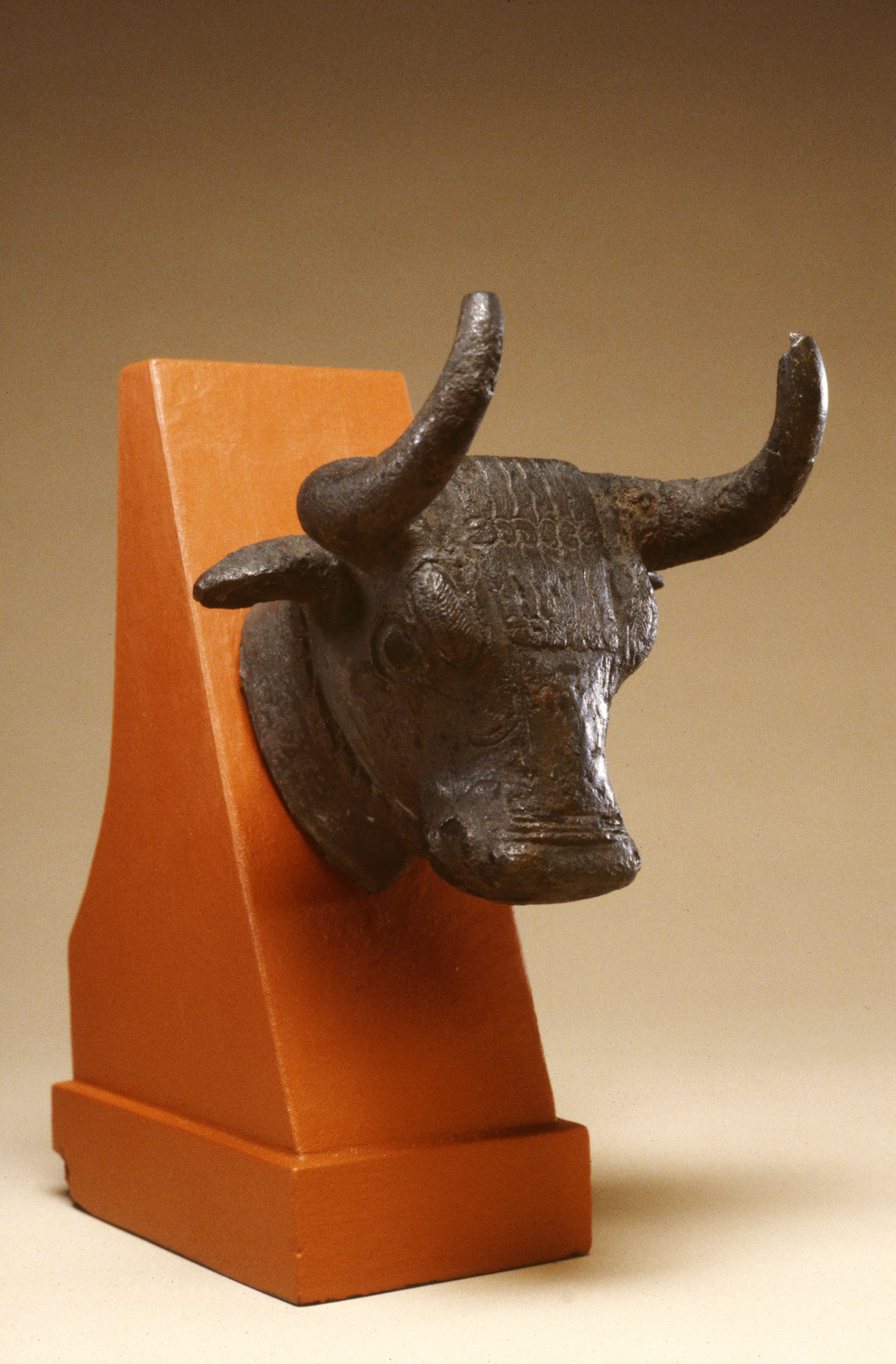
Head of a Bull, Urartu, 8th century BC. This head was attached to the rim of an enormous cauldron similar to the one shown above. Walters Art Museum collections.

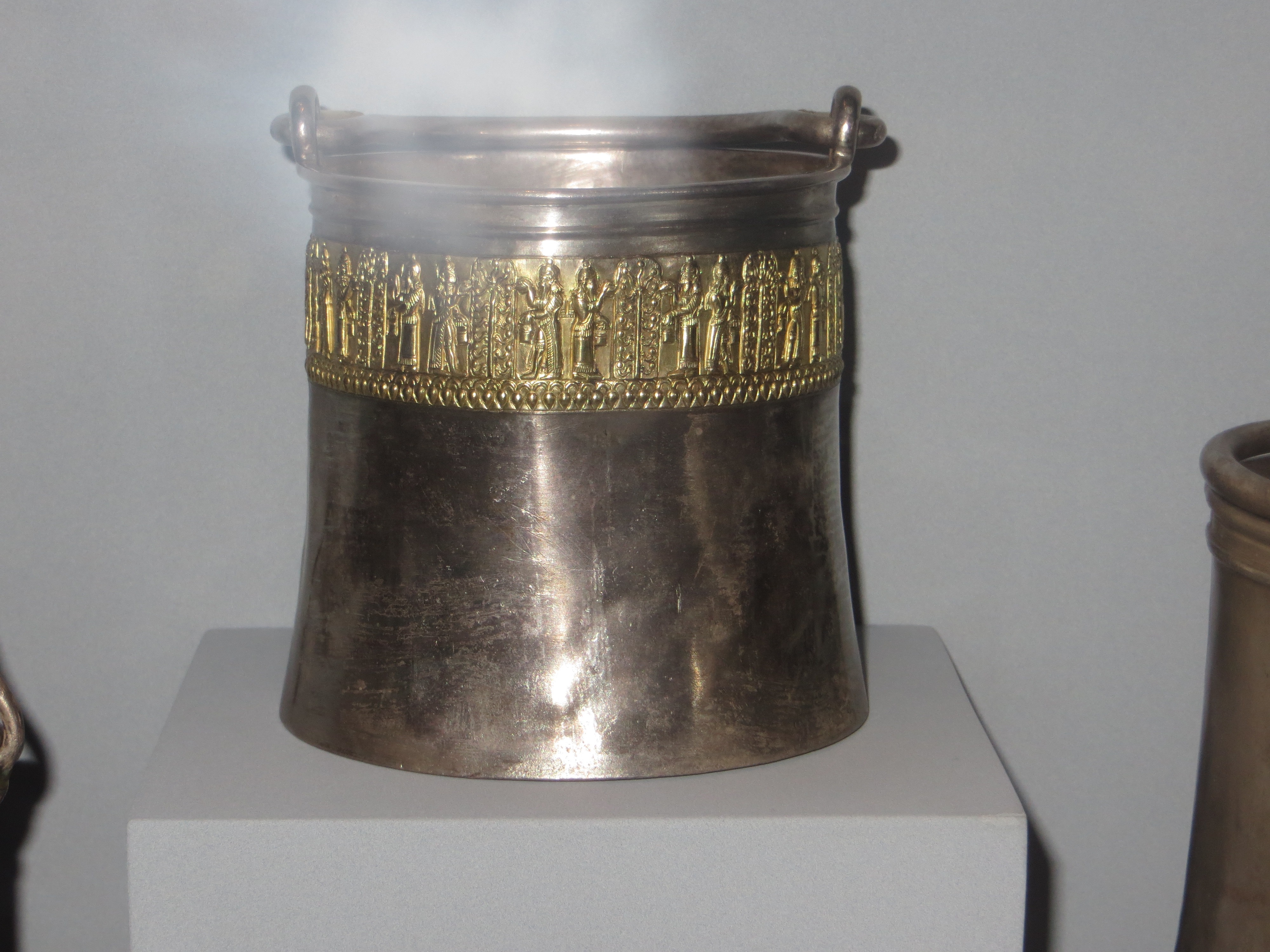
Silver bucket from Urartu in the Museum zu Allerheiligen in Schaffhausen Switzerland, allegedly from the tomb of Prince Inuspua, 810 BC

Urartian inscriptions were found in Kepenek Castle, located on a hill near the center of Muş, and in the Alazlı. Inspired by the writings of the medieval Armenian historian Movses Khorenatsi (who had described Urartian works in Van and attributed them to the legendary Ara the Beautiful and Queen Semiramis), the French scholar Antoine-Jean Saint-Martin suggested that his government send Friedrich Eduard Schulz, a German professor, to the Van area in 1827 on behalf of the French Oriental Society. Schulz discovered and copied numerous cuneiform inscriptions, partly in Assyrian and partly in a hitherto unknown language. Schulz also discovered the Kelishin stele, bearing an Assyrian-Urartian bilingual inscription, located on the Kelishin pass on the current Iraqi-Iranian border. A summary account of his initial discoveries was published in 1828. Schulz and four of his servants were murdered by Kurds in 1829 near Başkale. His notes were later recovered and published in Paris in 1840. In 1828, the British Assyriologist Henry Creswicke Rawlinson had attempted to copy the inscription on the Kelishin stele, but failed because of the ice on the stele's front side. The German scholar R. Rosch made a similar attempt a few years later, but he and his party were attacked and killed.

In the late 1840s Sir Austen Henry Layard examined and described the Urartian rock-cut tombs of Van Castle, including the Argishti chamber. From the 1870s, local residents began to plunder the Toprakkale ruins, selling its artefacts to European collections. In the 1880s this site underwent a poorly executed excavation organised by Hormuzd Rassam on behalf of the British Museum. Almost nothing was properly documented.

The first systematic collection of Urartian inscriptions, and thus the beginning of Urartology as a specialized field dates to the 1870s, with the campaign of Sir Archibald Henry Sayce. The German engineer Karl Sester, discoverer of Mount Nemrut, collected more inscriptions in 1890/1. Waldemar Belck visited the area in 1891, discovering the Rusa stele. A further expedition planned for 1893 was prevented by Turkish-Armenian hostilities. Belck together with Lehmann-Haupt visited the area again in 1898/9, excavating Toprakkale. On this expedition, Belck reached the Kelishin stele, but he was attacked by Kurds and barely escaped with his life. Belck and Lehmann-Haupt reached the stele again in a second attempt, but were again prevented from copying the inscription by weather conditions. After another assault on Belck provoked the diplomatic intervention of Wilhelm II, Sultan Abdul Hamid II agreed to pay Belck a sum of 80,000 gold marks in reparation. During World War I, the Lake Van region briefly fell under Russian control. In 1916, the Russian scholars Nikolay Yakovlevich Marr and Iosif Abgarovich Orbeli, excavating at the Van fortress, uncovered a four-faced stele carrying the annals of Sarduri II. In 1939 Boris Piotrovsky excavated Karmir Blur, discovering Teišebai, the city of the god of war, Teišeba. Excavations by the American scholars Kirsopp and Silva Lake in 1938-40 were cut short by World War II, and most of their finds and field records were lost when a German submarine torpedoed their ship, the SS Athenia. Their surviving documents were published by Manfred Korfmann in 1977.

A new phase of excavations began after the war. Excavations were at first restricted to Soviet Armenia. The fortress of Karmir Blur, dating from the reign of Rusa II, was excavated by a team headed by Boris Piotrovsky, and for the first time the excavators of a Urartian site published their findings systematically. Beginning in 1956 Charles A. Burney identified and sketch-surveyed many Urartian sites in the Lake Van area and, from 1959, a Turkish expedition under Tahsin Özgüç excavated Altintepe and Arif Erzen.

In the late 1960s, Urartian sites in northwest Iran were excavated. In 1976, an Italian team led by Mirjo Salvini finally reached the Kelishin stele, accompanied by a heavy military escort. The Gulf War then closed these sites to archaeological research. Oktay Belli resumed excavation of Urartian sites on Turkish territory: in 1989 Ayanis, a 7th-century BC fortress built by Rusas II of Urartu, was discovered 35 km north of Van. In spite of excavations, only a third to a half of the 300 known Urartian sites in Turkey, Iran, Iraq, and Armenia have been examined by archaeologists (Wartke 1993). Without protection, many sites have been plundered by local residents searching for treasure and other saleable antiquities.

On 12 November 2017, it was announced that archaeologists in Turkey had discovered the ruins of a Urartian castle during underwater excavations around Lake Van. The castle dated to the 8th or 7th centuries BC.

== Economy and politics ==
The economic structure of Urartu was similar to other states of the ancient world, especially Assyria. The state was heavily dependent on agriculture, which required centralized irrigation. These works were managed by kings, but implemented by free inhabitants and possibly slave labour provided by prisoners. Royal governors, influential people and, perhaps, free peoples had their own allotments. Individual territories within the state had to pay taxes the central government: grain, horses, bulls, etc. In peacetime, Urartu probably led an active trade with Assyria, providing cattle, horses, iron and wine.

Agriculture in Urartu
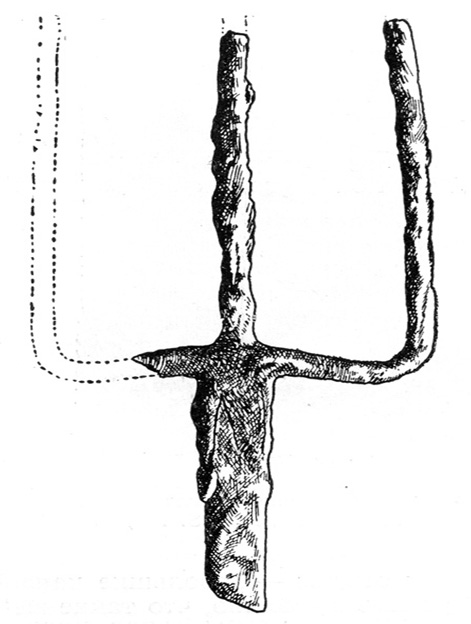
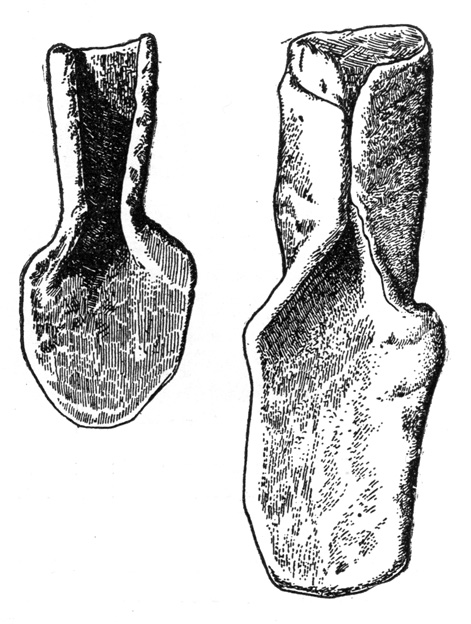
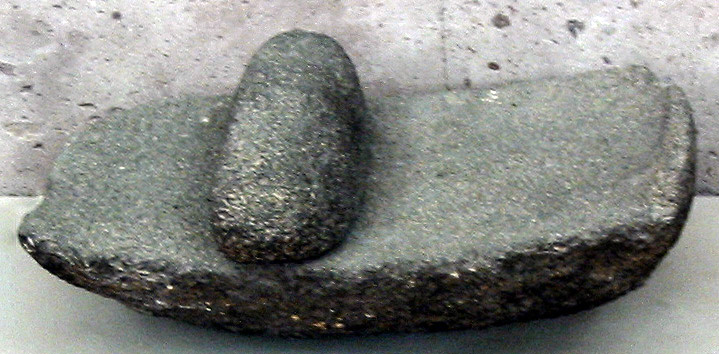
Part of iron pitchfork, found near Lake Van, and iron plowshare, found during excavations in Rusahinili (Toprakkale)	Urartian saddle quern

According to archaeological data, farming on the territory of Urartu developed from the Neolithic, even in the 3rd millennium BC. In the Urartian age, agriculture was well developed and closely related to Assyrian methods on the selection of cultures and methods of processing. From cuneiform sources, it is known that in Urartu grew wheat, barley, sesame, millet, and emmer, and cultivated gardens and vineyards. Many regions of the Urartu state required artificial irrigation, which has successfully been organized by the rulers of Urartu in the heyday of the state. In several regions remain ancient irrigation canals, constructed by Urartu, mainly during the Argishti I and Menua period, some of which are still used for irrigation.

== Art and architecture ==
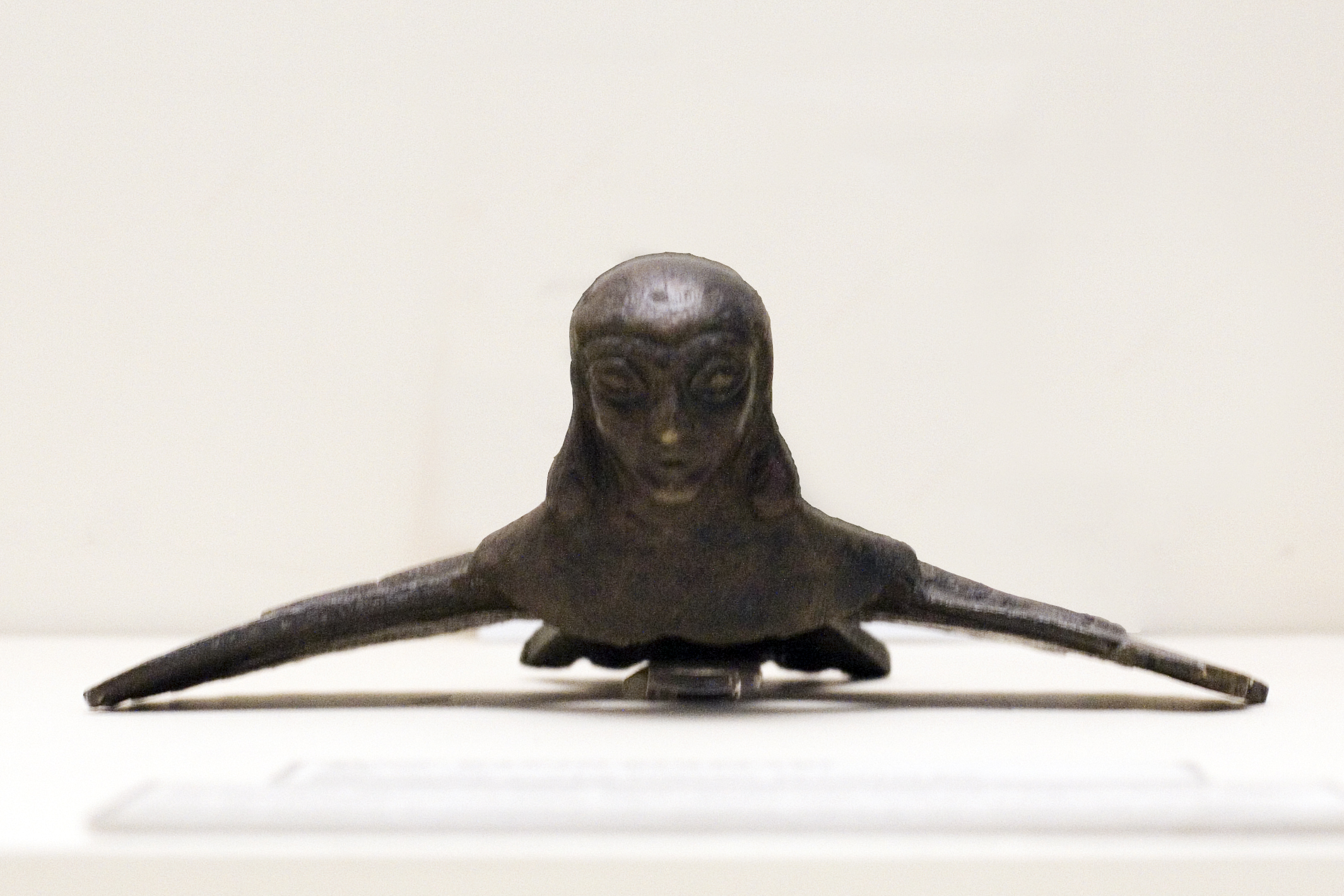
Bronze figurine of the winged goddess Tushpuea, with suspension hook

There is a number of remains of sturdy stone architecture, as well as some mud brick, especially when it has been burnt, which helps survival. Stone remains are mainly fortresses and walls, with temples and mausolea, and many rock-cut tombs. The style, which developed regional variations, shows a distinct character, partly because of the greater use of stone compared to neighbouring cultures. The typical temple was square, with stone walls as thick as the open internal area but using mud brick for the higher part. These were placed at the highest point of a citadel and from surviving depictions were high, perhaps with gabled roofs; their emphasis on verticality has been claimed as an influence of later Christian Armenian architecture.

The art of Urartu is especially notable for fine lost-wax bronze objects: weapons, figurines, vessels including grand cauldrons that were used for sacrifices, fittings for furniture, and helmets. There are also remains of ivory and bone carvings, frescos, cylinder seals and pottery. In general their style is a somewhat less sophisticated blend of influences from neighbouring cultures. Archaeology has produced relatively few examples of the jewellery in precious metals that the Assyrians boasted of carrying off in great quantities from Musasir in 714 BC.

== Religion ==
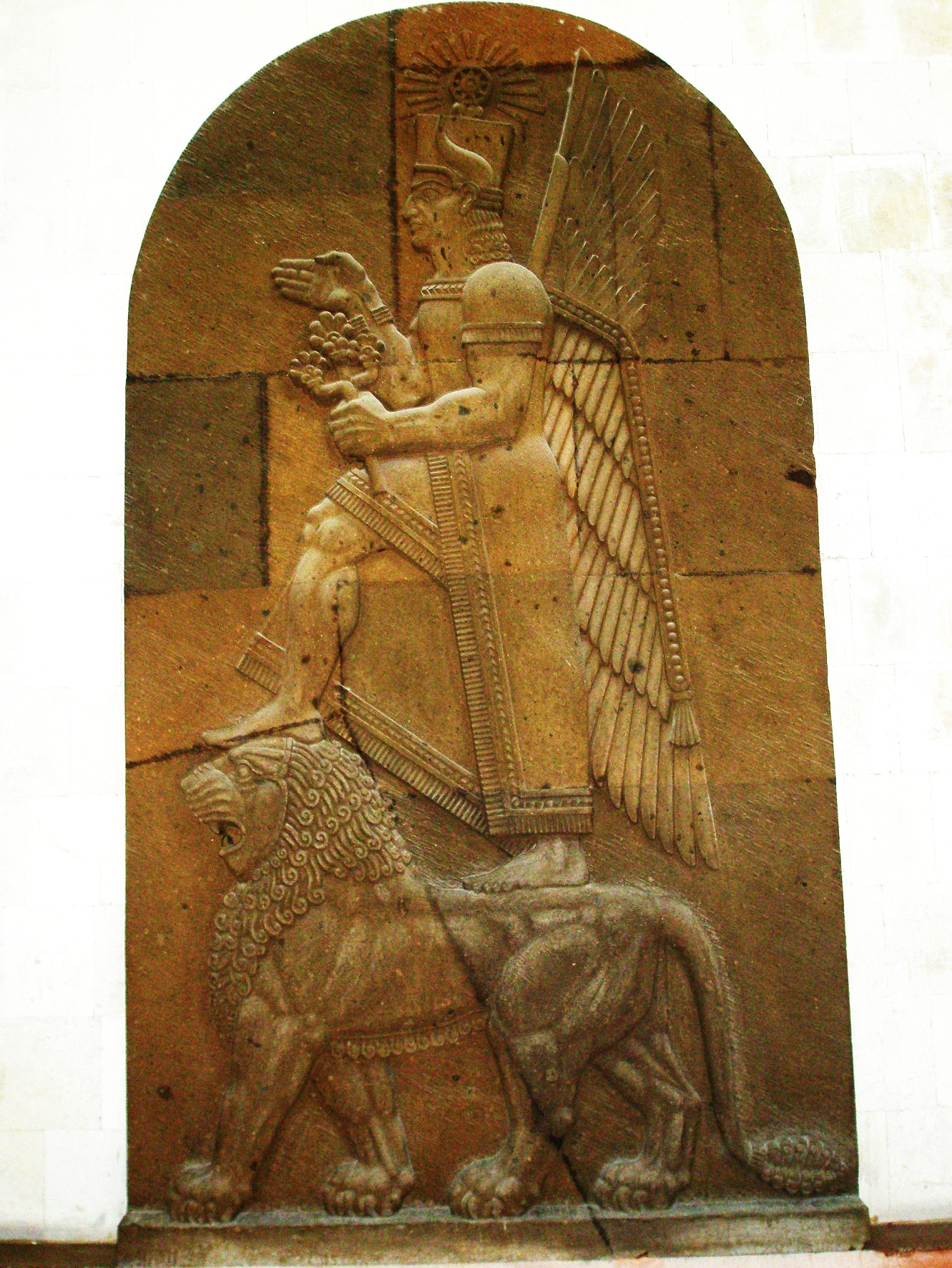
A modern depiction of the god Ḫaldi based on Urartian originals

The Urartian pantheon seems to have comprised a diverse mix of Hurrian, Akkadian, Armenian, and Hittite deities.

Starting with the reign of Ishpuini, the Urartian pantheon was headed by a triad made up of Ḫaldi (the supreme god), Theispas (Teisheba, god of thunder and storms, as well as sometimes war), and Shivini (a solar god). Their king was also the chief-priest or envoy of Ḫaldi. Some temples to Ḫaldi were part of the royal palace complex, while others were independent structures.

With the expansion of Urartian territory, many of the gods worshipped by conquered peoples were incorporated into the Urartian pantheon as a means of confirming the annexation of territories and promoting political stability. Some main gods and goddesses of the Urartian pantheon include:

- Ḫaldi
- Theispas
- Shivini (Siuini)
- Arubani (Bagvarti)
- Hutuini
- Sebitu
- Kuera
- Tushpuea
- Selardi or Melardi
- Baba
- Arṭuʾarasau

Ḫaldi was not a native Urartian god but apparently an obscure Akkadian deity (which explains the location of the main temple of worship for Ḫaldi in Musasir, believed to be near modern Rawandiz, Iraq). Ḫaldi was not initially worshiped by the Urartians as their chief god. His cult does not appear to have been introduced until the reign of Ishpuini.

Theispas was a version of the Hurrian god, Teshub.

According to Diakonoff and Vyacheslav Ivanov, Shivini (likely pronounced Shiwini or Siwini) was likely borrowed from the Hittites.

On the Gate of Mehr (Mehri-Dur), overlooking modern Van, an inscription lists a total of 79 deities, and what type of sacrificial offerings should be made to each; goats, sheep, cattle, and other animals served as the sacrificial offerings. Urartians did not practice human sacrifice.

A number of the gods mentioned in the Gate of Mehr may be of Armenian origins, including Ara (or Arwaa), and possibly the goddess Selardi (although there is confusion about this deity's gender and name, some believe it is to be read Melardi).

It has been suggested that the Urartian pantheon could correspond to mountain peaks located within the Armenian Highlands.

== Language ==
The modern name of the written language used by the kingdom's political elite is Urartian; the language is attested in numerous cuneiform inscriptions throughout Armenia and eastern Turkey. It is unknown what other languages were spoken by the peoples of Urartu under the Kingdom of Van, but there is evidence of linguistic contact between the proto-Armenian language and the Urartian language at an early date (sometime between the 3rd—2nd millennium BC), before the formation of the kingdom.

Urartians used Assyrian language, script, and form in building inscriptions. This language and script was used until the late ninth century BC when the Urartian language was used.

=== Urartian language ===
"Urartian" is the modern name for the extinct language used in the cuneiform inscriptions of the Kingdom of Urartu. Its only known relative is Hurrian; together they form the small Hurro-Urartian language family. Other names used to refer to the language are "Khaldian" ("Ḫaldian"), or "neo-Hurrian". The latter term is considered problematic, however, as it is now thought that Urartian and Hurrian share a common ancestor; formerly, it was thought that Urartian was descended from, or a dialect of, Hurrian. In fact, according to Paul Zimansky:

The earliest dialect of Hurrian, seen in the Tiš-atal royal inscription and reconstructed from various early second millennium B.C.E. sources, shows features that disappeared in later Hurrian but are present in Urartian (Wilhelm 1988:63). In short, the more we discover or deduce about the earliest stages of Hurrian, the more it looks like Urartian (Gragg 1995:2170).

The Urartian language is an ergative-absolutive, agglutinative language, which belongs to neither the Semitic nor the Indo-European language families, but to the Hurro-Urartian language family, which is not known to be related to any other language or language family, despite repeated attempts to find genetic links.

Examples of the Urartian language have survived in many inscriptions, written in the Assyrian cuneiform script, found throughout the area of the Kingdom of Urartu. Although, the bulk of the cuneiform inscriptions within Urartu were written in the Urartian language, a minority of them were also written in Akkadian (the official language of Assyria).

There are also claims of autochthonous Urartian hieroglyphs, but this remains uncertain. Unlike the cuneiform inscriptions, Urartian hieroglyphs have not been successfully deciphered. As a result, scholars disagree as to what language is used, or whether they even constitute writing at all. The Urartians originally would have used these locally developed hieroglyphs, but later adapted the Assyrian cuneiform script for most purposes. After the 8th century BC, the hieroglyphic script would have been restricted to religious and accounting purposes.

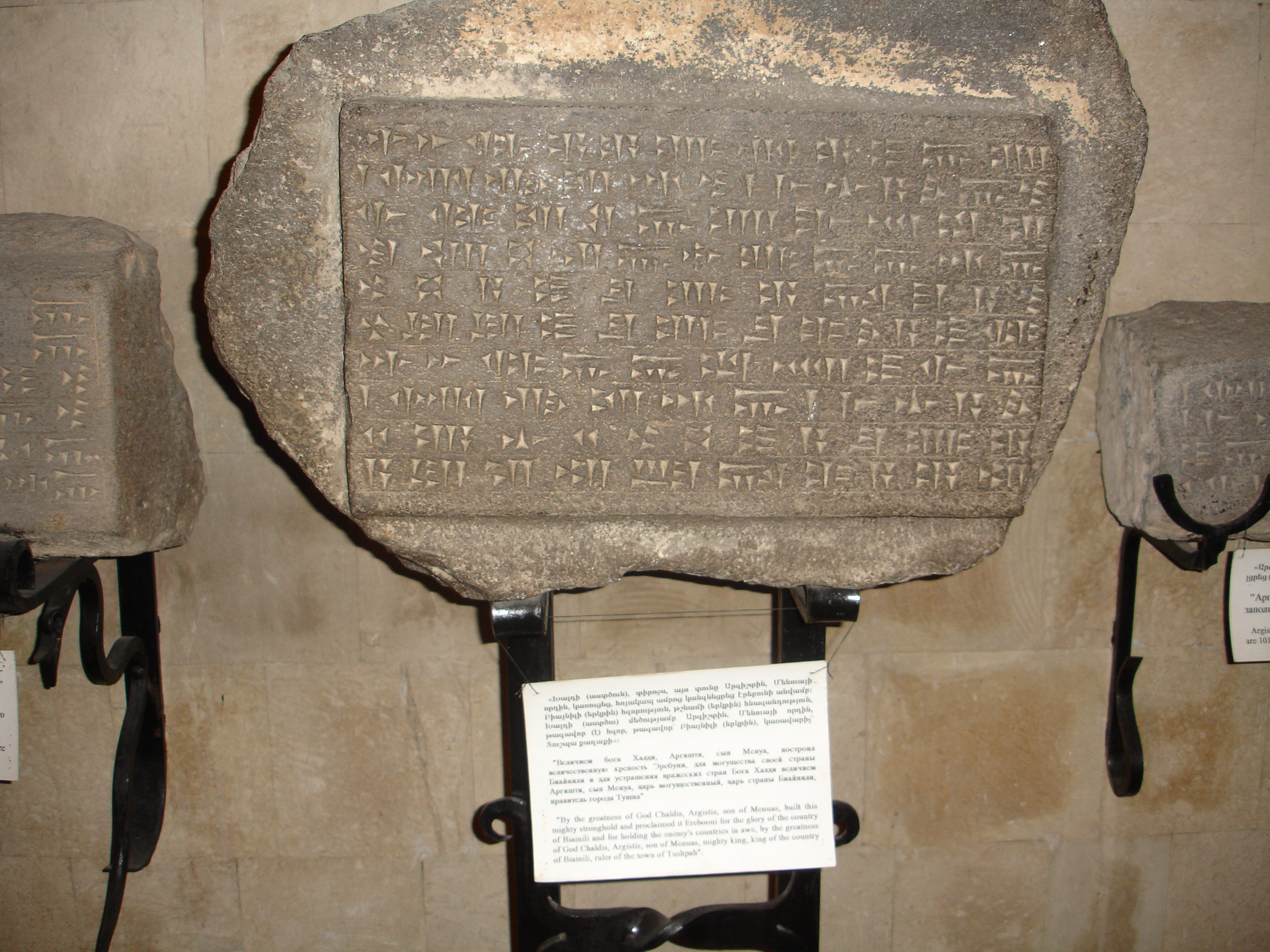
Urartian cuneiform recording the foundation of Erebuni Fortress by Argishti

The Kingdom of Urartu, during its dominance, had united disparate tribes, each of which had its own culture and traditions. Thus, when the political structure was destroyed, little remained that could be identified as one unified Urartian culture. According to Zimansky:

Far from being grounded on long standing cultural uniformities, [Urartu] was merely a superstructure of authority, below which there was plenty of room for the groups to manifest in the Anatolia of Xenophon to flourish. We need not hypothesize massive influxes of new peoples, ethnic replacement, or any very great mechanisms of cultural change. The Armenians, Carduchoi, Chaldaioi, and Taochoi could easily have been there all along, accommodated and concealed within the structure of command established by the Urartian kings.

Ultimately, little is known of what was truly spoken in the geopolitical region until the creation of the Armenian alphabet in the 4th century AD. Some scholars believe that the ethnonym "Armina" itself and all other names attested with reference to the rebellions against Darius in the Satrapy of Armenia (the proper names Araxa, Haldita, and Dādṛšiš, the toponyms Zūzahya, Tigra, and Uyamā, and the district name Autiyāra) are not connected with Armenian linguistic and onomastic material attested later in native Armenian sources, nor are they Iranian, but seem related to Urartian. However, others suggest that some of these names have Armenian or Iranian etymologies.

=== Proto-Armenian language ===
The presence of a population who spoke Proto-Armenian in Urartu prior to its demise is subject to speculation, but the existence of Urartian words in the Armenian language and Armenian loanwords into Urartian suggests early contact between the two languages and long periods of bilingualism. The presence of toponyms, tribal names, and deities of probable Proto-Armenian etymologies which are attested in records left by Urartian kings, such as Uelikuni, Uduri-Etiuni, Abiliani, and Arzashkun, the personal names Arame and Diaṣuni, and the deities Arṣibedini and Aniqu, further supports the presence of an Armenian speaking population in at least the northern regions of Urartu. The Urartian confederation united the disparate peoples of the highlands, which began a process of intermingling of the peoples and cultures (probably including Armenian tribes) and languages (probably including Proto-Armenian) within the highlands. This intermixing would ultimately culminate in the emergence of the Armenian language as the dominant language within the region.

A theory, supported by the official historiography of Armenia and experts in Assyrian and Urartian studies such as Igor M. Diakonoff, Giorgi Melikishvili, Mikhail Nikolsky, and Ivan Mestchaninov, suggests that Urartian was solely the formal written language of the state, while its inhabitants, including the royal family, spoke Proto-Armenian. This theory primarily hinges on the fact that the Urartian language used in the cuneiform inscriptions were very repetitive and scant in vocabulary (having as little as 350–400 roots). Furthermore, over 250 years of usage, it shows no development, which is taken to indicate that the language had ceased to be spoken before the time of the inscriptions or was used only for official purposes.

A complementary theory, suggested by Tamaz V. Gamkrelidze and Ivanov in 1984, places the Proto-Indo-European homeland (the location where Indo-European would have emerged from) in the Armenian Highlands, which would entail the presence of proto-Armenians in the area during the entire lifetime of the Urartian state. Although this theory has less support than the more popular Kurgan hypothesis, the Armenian hypothesis would support the theory that the Urartian language was not spoken, but simply written, and postulates that the Armenian language was an in situ development of a 3rd millennium BC Proto-Indo-European language.

== See also ==
- Hurrians
- Urarteans
- Hurro-Urartian languages
- Nairi
- Mushki
- Urumeans
- Etiuni
- Mannaeans
- Architecture of Urartu
- Economy of Urartu
- List of kings of Urartu
- Orontid Armenia
