= Lutipri =

King of Urartu
- Reign: c. 844–834 BC
- Predecessor: Aramu
- Successor: Sarduri I
- Issue: Sarduri I

Lutipri was the father of the Urartian king Sarduri I.

Lutipri may have ruled Urartu between 844 and 834 BCE, in a period of obscurity after the destruction of the former capital Arzashkun by Shalmaneser III.

As Sarduri I may have established a new dynasty, it is possible that his father, Lutipri, was not actually a king of Urartu.

== Attestation ==
An inscription, in Assyrian cuneiform, on a small fortification west of the citadel of Tushpa, mentions his son as builder of a wall, and it is likely that he is in fact the founder of the town.

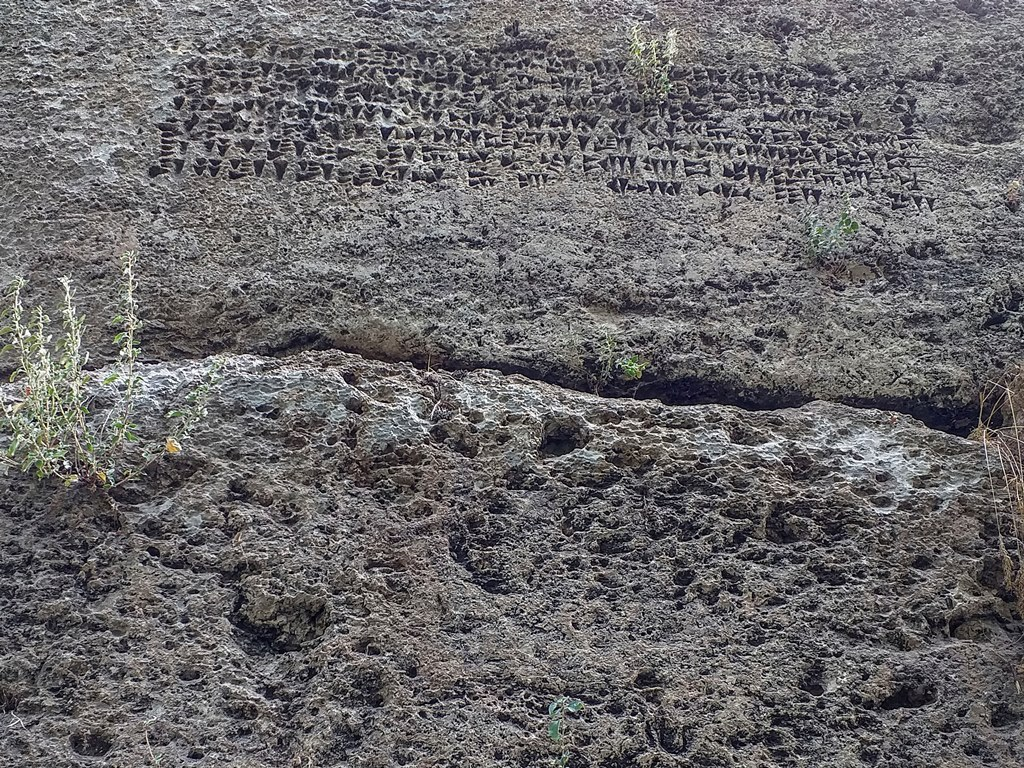
Inscription of Sarduri I, son of Lutibri at the fortress of Tushpa

The inscription reads:

This is the inscription of king Sarduri, son of the great king Lutipri, the powerful king who does not fear to fight, the amazing shepherd, the king who ruled the rebels. I am Sarduri, son of Lutipri, the king of kings and the king who received the tribute of all the kings. Sarduri, son of Lutipri, says: I brought these stone blocks from the city of Alniunu. I built this wall.

== See also ==
- List of kings of Urartu
