= Arzashkun =

Capital of the early kingdom of Urartu

Arzashkun or Arṣashkun was the capital of the early kingdom of Urartu in the 9th century BC, before Sarduri I moved it to Tushpa in 832 BC. Arzashkun had double walls and towers, but was captured by Shalmaneser III in the 850s BC.

== Name ==
Arzashkun seems to be the Assyrian form of an Armenian name ending in -ka formed from a proper name Arzash. The root of Arzashkun may ultimately be Proto-Indo-European *harg- or *h₂erǵ-, meaning "bright, white", by way of Proto-Armenian intermediaries "Arcesk'o" and then "Arčešo" (genitive: "Arčišoy").

Arzashkun was hidden, and protected from attack, by a dense forest almost impassable to a regular army.

== Location ==
The precise location of the city is uncertain. It has been located variously by different scholars as along the shore of Lake Van, near Lake Urmia, near Malazgirt, or at Bostankaya between Malazgirt and Patnos. The name of Adduri Mountain, which was used in the Urartian period, is today Cemalverdi Mountains.

According to Robert Hewsen and Armen Petrosyan, Arzashkun was at the northeastern shore of Lake Van, probably near the site of old Arjesh, now inundated by the waters of Lake Van. Arzashkun recalls the names Arsene and Arsissa, applied by the ancients to part of Lake Van. This is likely modern Erciş. It may also be connected to Lake Erçek, located to the immediate east of Lake Van.

Alternately, Arzashkun might represent the Ardzik of the Armenian historical records, located west of Malazgirt.

== Fall of Arzashkun ==
At the headwaters of the river Tigris, there appears in the ninth century, B.C., an organized state of Urartu. Shalmaneser regarded it as so menacing to Assyria's interest that he undertook an expedition in 857, claimed to have destroyed the capital Arzashkun, penetrated as far as Lake Van, and left his inscription on Mount Irritia.

Shalmaneser on his Black Obelisk records this campaign:

(35-44) In the third year of my reign, Ahuni, son of Adini, was frightened before my mighty weapons and retreated from Til-barzip, his royal city. I crossed the Euphrates. I seized for myself the city of Ana-Assur-utir-asbat, which lies on the other side of the Euphrates, on the Sagur river, which the Hittite people called Pitru. When I returned, I entered the passes of the land of Alzi; the lands of Alzi, Suhni, Daiaeni, Tumme, Arzashkunu, the royal city of Arame, the Armenian (king), Gilzânu, and Hubushkia (I conquered).

== See also ==
- Urartu
- Sugunia
- Lake Erçek
