= Friedrich Eduard Schulz =

German philosopher and orientalist

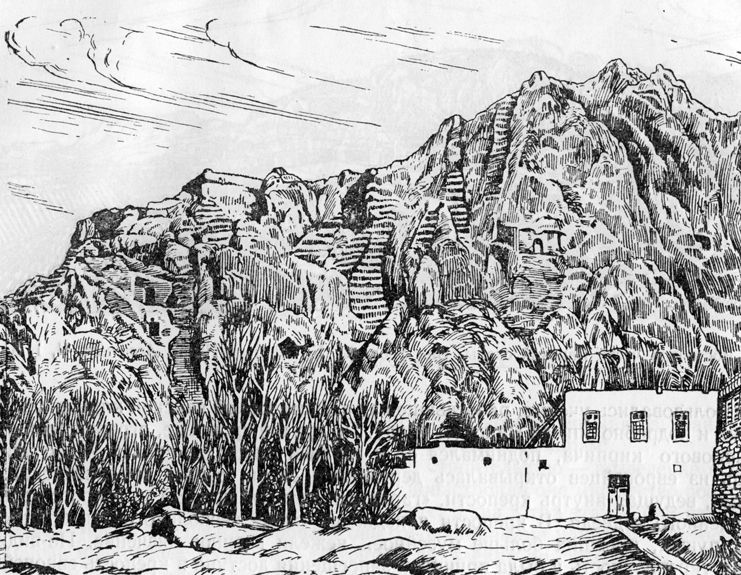
Drawing of Van cliff by Friedrich Eduard Schulz.

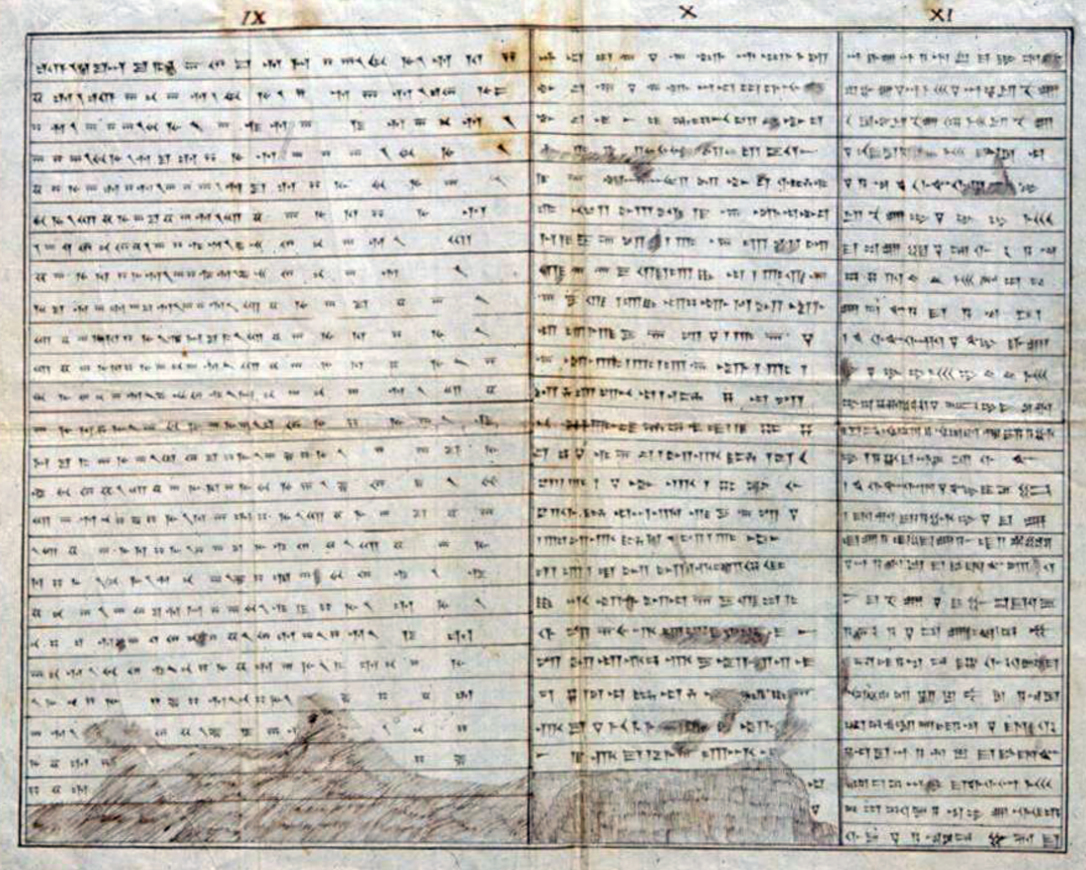
Xerxes I inscription at Van, copy by Friedrich Eduard Schulz in 1827

Friedrich Eduard Schulz (1799–1829, also known as Friedrich Edward Schulz) was a German philosopher and orientalist, who was one of the first to uncover evidence of the Kingdom of Urartu.

== Research on Urartu ==
In 1827, the French scholar Antoine-Jean Saint-Martin recommended that his government send Schulz, then a young professor at the University of Giessen, to the area around Lake Van in what is now eastern Turkey on behalf of the French Oriental Society. Schulz discovered and copied numerous cuneiform inscriptions, partly in Assyrian and partly in a hitherto unknown language. Schulz also re-discovered the Kelishin stele, bearing an Assyrian-Urartian bilingual inscription, located on the Kelishin pass on the current Iraqi-Iranian border. A summary account of his initial discoveries was published in 1828. Schultz remained in the region, and was murdered along with two Persian army officers and four of his servants by Kurds in 1829 near Başkale.

After Schultz's death, his papers, containing 42 inscriptions found at Van Castle and in its neighborhood, were recovered and published in Paris in 1840. This was some of the first original information on Urartu to appear in Europe.
