= Nairi =

Assyrian name for a region and group of tribes in the Armenian Highlands

Nairi (Akkadian: 𒆳𒆳𒈾𒄿𒊑, romanized: mātāt [KUR.KUR] Na-i-ri, lit. 'Nairi lands', also Na-'i-ru; Armenian: Նաիրի) was the Akkadian name for a region inhabited by a particular group (possibly a confederation or league) of tribal principalities in the Armenian Highlands, approximately spanning the area between modern Diyarbakır and Lake Van and the region west of Lake Urmia. Nairi has sometimes been equated with Nihriya, known from Mesopotamian, Hittite, and Urartian sources. However, its co-occurrence with Nihriya within a single text may argue against this.

Prior to the Bronze Age collapse, the Nairi tribes were considered a force strong enough to contend with both Assyria and Hatti. If Nairi and Nihriya are to be identified, then the region was the site of the Battle of Nihriya (c. 1230 BCE), the culminating point of the hostilities between Hittites and Assyrians for control over the remnants of the former kingdom of Mitanni.

The first kings of Urartu referred to their kingdom as Nairi instead of the native self-appellation Bianili. However, the exact relationship between Urartu and Nairi is unclear. Some scholars believe that Urartu was a part of Nairi until the former's consolidation as an independent kingdom, while others have suggested that Urartu and Nairi were separate polities. The Assyrians seem have continued to refer to Nairi as a distinct entity for decades after the establishment of Urartu, until Nairi was totally absorbed by Assyria and Urartu in the 8th century BCE.

== Geography and history ==
According to Trevor Bryce, the Nairi lands were inhabited by "fierce tribal groups" divided into a number of small principalities. They are first mentioned in the inscriptions of the Assyrian king Tukulti-Ninurta I (r. 1243–1207 BCE), who claimed to have defeated and exacted tribute from forty Nairi kings. An early documented reference to Nairi from the 13th century BCE is a tablet which describes the purchase of 128 horses from the Nairi region. According to Bryce, parts of Urartu, a state of Nairi, corresponded to the Azzi of Hittite texts from the same period.

The names of twenty-three Nairi lands were recorded by Tiglath-Pileser I (r. 1114–1076 BCE). Their southernmost point was Tumme, known to have been south-west of Lake Urmia, and their northernmost point was Daiaeni. These lands are known from the list of defeated kings: "the king of Tumme, the king of Tunube, the king of Tuali, the king of Kindari, the king of Uzula, the king of Unzamuni, the king of Andiabe, the king of Pilakinni, the king of Aturgini, the king of Kulibarzini, the king of Shinibirni, the king of Himua, the king of Paiteri, the king of Uiram, the king of Shururia, the king of Albaia, the king of Ugina, the king of Nazabia, the king of Abarsiuni, and the king of Daiaeni." Other inscriptions describing Tiglath-Pileser's campaign number the defeated kings at thirty or sixty. It is believed that Nairi extended from the Tur Abdin mountains in the south to the mountainous area southeast of Lake Van in the north.

In 882 BCE, Assurnasirbal II invaded Nairi, which at the time comprised four polities: Bit-Zamani, Shubru, Nirdun, and Urumu/Nirbu. These regions all had their own kings. In particular, Assurnasirbal conquered the fortified city of Madara, along with sixty other "cities" ruled by a certain Lapturi.

Assurnasirbal's successor Shalmaneser III campaigned in the region in the fifteenth year of his reign (844 BCE), erecting a statue at the source of the Tigris. Shalmaneser had earlier campaigned against the land of Hubushkia in 858 BCE; his inscriptions report him washing his weapons in the "Sea of Nairi," which refers to either Lake Van or Lake Urmia. Bryce states that some of his "royal inscriptions indicate that the term [Nairi] now also denoted a specific region to the southwest of Lake Urmia, centred on the land of Hubushkia." The exact location of Hubushkia is uncertain. Shalmaneser pursued Kakia, king of Nairi and Hubushkia, into the mountains, subsequently slaughtering his army and forcing him to surrender. He then marched on and destroyed Sugunia, the first capital of Arame, the first known king of Urartu (Shalmaneser campaigned against Urartu several more times throughout his reign).

Shalmaneser's successor Shamshi-Adad V (r. 823–811 BCE) campaigned in Nairi at least three times; on the third campaign, he is said to have received tributes of horses from the rulers of Hubushkia, Sunbu, Mannaea, Parsua, and Taurla. His successor Adad-nirari III claimed to have conquered the whole of Nairi. Sargon II's (r. 722–705 BCE) inscriptions describe him receiving tribute from Yanzu, king of Nairi, in his fortified city of Hubushkia.

In Mirjo Salvini's view, despite their identification in some sources, Urartu and Nairi referred to separate entities until the expansion of the former in the late 9th century BCE. By that time, Urartu had probably conquered so much of the Nairi lands that the "early Urartian kings felt Nairi was a suitable name for the kingdom they ruled." Caught between expanding Urartu and Assyria, Nairi's existence as an independent entity ended in the early 8th-century BCE. In the mid-8th century BCE, part of Nairi is mentioned as an Assyrian province, while in the 7th century BCE, the term is occasionally used in Assyrian sources to refer to the province of Amedi (modern Diyabakır).

== Populations ==
Albrecht Goetze suggested that what he refers to as the Hurriland dissolved into a number of small states that the Assyrians called Nairi. Others regard this hypothesis skeptically; for example, Warren C. Benedict points out that there is no evidence of the presence of Hurrians in the vicinity of Lake Van.

Linguistic evidence suggests that speakers of Proto-Armenian were present in the Armenian Highlands at least as early as the beginning of the 1st millennium BCE.

According to Lorenzo D'Alfonso, the Nairi tribe Tuali may have moved west and founded the Iron Age neo-Hittite kingdom of Tabal.

== In Armenian culture ==
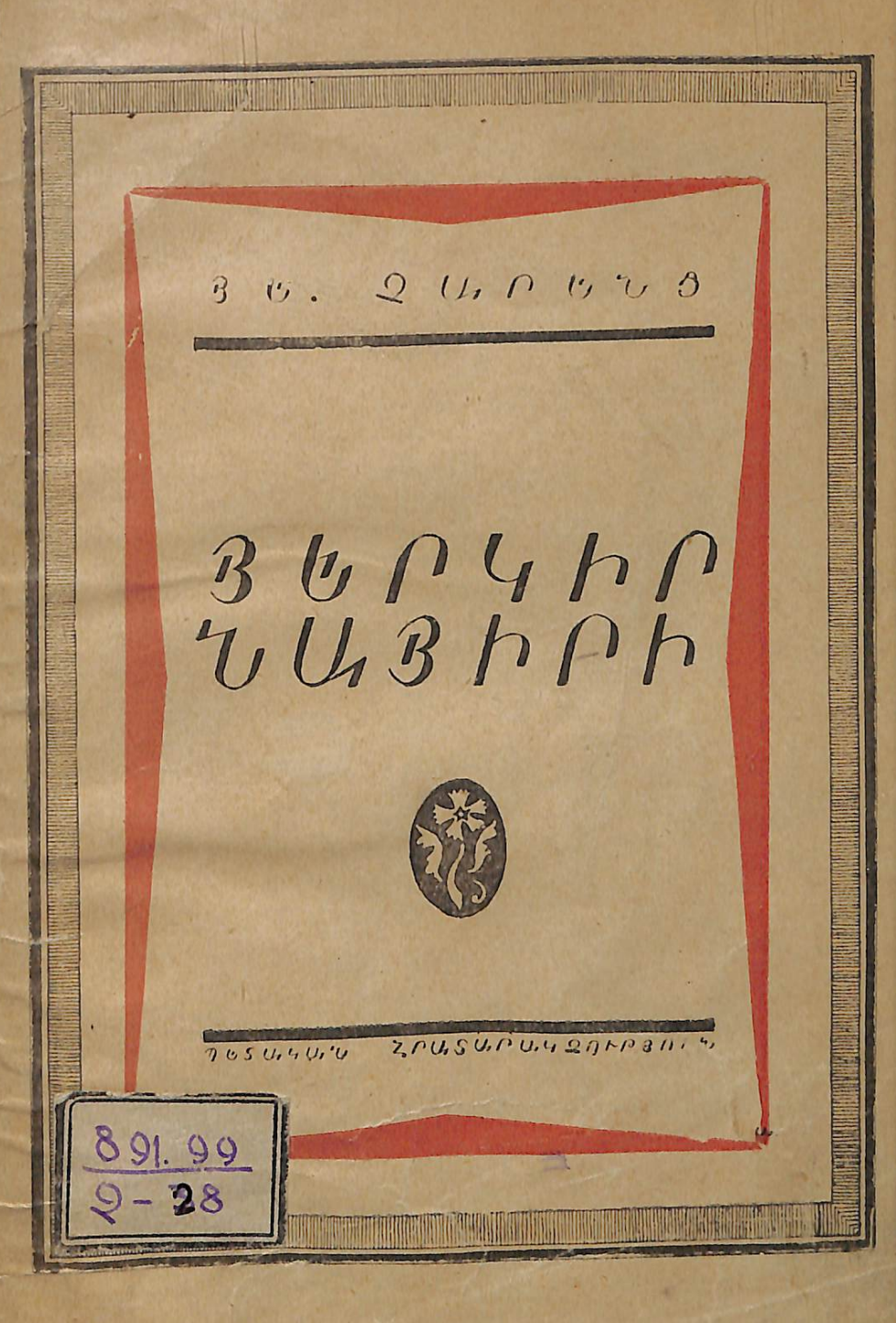
The cover of Charents' Yerkir Nairi, 1926.

Nairi (Armenian: Նայիրի, Nayiri or Նաիրի, Nairi) is a poetic name of Armenia. It was notably used by the poets Vahan Terian and Yeghishe Charents as a synonym for Armenia. Yerkir Nairi (Land of Nairi) was the title of both Terian's collection of 18 poems written in the mid-1910s and a satirical novel by Charents, published in a complete volume in 1926. Terian wrote the poems while he was a student at the Saint Petersburg University's Department of Oriental Studies under Nicholas Marr, where he delved into ancient history. Terian successfully revived Nairi as an old name of Armenia. For Charents, Nairi is a national illusion. Critic Suren Aghababian described the novel as the cornerstone of Soviet Armenian prose.

Another poet, born Hayastan Yeghiazarian, adopted Nairi Zarian as his pen name in the 1920s. It has since become a unisex name among Armenians. It is sometimes spelled as Nayiri or Nyree, while Nairuhi (Nayiruhi) and Naira are exclusively female names. (Note: As of 2022, Armenia's voter registry contains 1,151 individuals with the name Nairi (Նաիրի), 23 people named Nayiri (Նայիրի) and 382 people named Nairuhi (Նաիրուհի).)

It has also been used for various things, including institutions, localities, and products:

- Nairi Cinema, established in the 1920s, is Yerevan's oldest movie theater.
- Yerkir Nairi (Land of Nairi) is a 1930 feature-length documentary directed by Hamo Beknazarian (Armenkino).
- Nayiri (Նայիրի) was a literary periodical, established by the writer Antranig Dzarugian in 1941. It was published in Aleppo, Syria until 1949 and in Beirut, Lebanon from 1951 to 1983.
- In Soviet Armenia, a village and a district were named Nairi in 1963 and 1972, respectively. The village was renamed in 1991, while the district, centered around Yeghvard, was merged into the newly formed Kotayk Province in 1995. The Nairi municipality (community), with its center in Yeghvard, came into existence as part of administrative reforms in 2021.
- The Alashkert Stadium in Yerevan, built in the 1960s, was known as Nairi Stadium until it was acquired by FC Alashkert in 2013/2014.
- The Nairi computer series were developed by the Yerevan Scientific Research Institute of Mathematical Machines (YerNIIMM) in the 1960s.
- The Nairit was a major industrial enterprise in Yerevan, established in 1976 by the merger of the Yerevan Chemical Plant and the Polymers Research and Engineering Institute. Nairit was also the name of around 30 types of chloroprene synthetic rubber. They were named for Nairi.
- The Nairi brandy is produced by the Yerevan Brandy Company since 1967.
- Nairi Medical Center, founded in 2005, in Yerevan is one of Armenia's leading medical institutions.
- The website Nayiri.com, founded in 2005, is a digital library and online dictionary that contains major dictionaries and several books in Classical, Western and Eastern Armenian. It also released Nayiriboard, a keyboard-spellchecker in 2020.

== See also ==
- Hayasa
- Bronze Age collapse
- Armenian Highlands
- Detail of map showing Nairi between Lakes Urmia and Van, and also between Lake Van and the Tigris
- Detailed map with Lake Urmia as 'Lower Sea of Nairi', and lake Van as 'Upper Sea of Nairi'
