= Ishpuini =

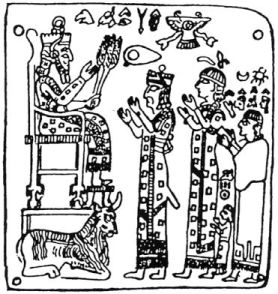

King of Urartu
- Reign: c. 828–810 BCE
- Predecessor: Sarduri I
- Successor: Menua
- Died: 810 BCE
- Issue: Sarduri, Menua
- Father: Sarduri I

Ishpuini (also Ishpuinis) (r. 828 – 810 BCE) was king of Urartu. He succeeded his father, Sarduri I, who moved the capital to Tushpa (Van). Ishpuini conquered the Mannaean city of Musasir, which was then made the religious center of the empire. The main temple for the war god Haldi was in Musasir. Ishpuini's kingdom was then attacked by the forces of the Assyrian King Shamshi-Adad V. Ishpuini fought and defeated Shamshi-Adad. Ishpuini was so confident in his power that he began using names meaning everlasting glory, including "King of the land of Nairi", "Glorious King", and "King of the Universe".

Ishpuini was succeeded by his son, Menua.

Apart from the Kepenek Castle inscription, another inscription proving the existence of the Urartian Kingdom in the geography of Muş is the Alazlı/Tirmet inscription. The inscription in question is located 25.5 km east of Muş province and 6.2 km south of Korkut district. In the inscription, the war fought by the Urartian king Menua is mentioned:

Menua, the son of İşpuini, brought this stone to our Lord Haldi. Tann Haldi went on a military expedition with his spear. He captured the city of Trtimi in the territory of the country of Urme.

== See also ==
- List of kings of Urartu
