= Kelashin Stele =

Stele found in Kelashin, Iraq, that bears an Urartian-Akkadian bilingual text

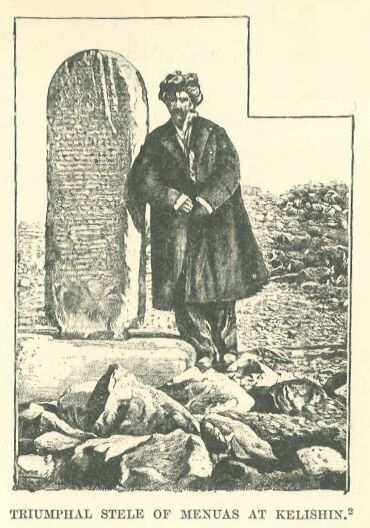
- A depiction of the Kelashin Stele from the early 20th century
- Created: c. 800 BC
- Discovered: 1827; Iran or Iraq
- Discovered by: Friedrich Schulz
- Present location: British Museum, London, England

The Kelashin Stele (Kurdish: کێلەشین) (also Kelishin or Keli-Shin; from Kurdish Language: Blue Stone) found in Kelashin, Kurdistan, bears an important Urartian-Akkadian bilingual text dating to c. 800 BC, first described by Friedrich Eduard Schulz in 1827. Part of Schulz's notes were lost when he was killed by Kurdish "bandits", and later expeditions were either prevented by weather conditions or Kurdish brigands, so that a copy (latex squeeze) of the inscription could only be made in 1951 by G. Cameron, and again in 1976 by an Italian party under heavy military protection.

The inscription describes the acquisition of the city of Musasir (Ardini) by the Urartian king Ishpuini.
