= Sugunia =

First capital of Arame of Urartu

Sugunia was the first capital of Arame of Urartu. The city was mentioned in an inscription by the Assyrian king Shalmaneser III, who destroyed it in 858 BC.

The Monolith Inscription of Shalmaneser III:

To the city of Sugunia, the stronghold of Aram of the land of Ararat, I advanced the city, I besieged, I took. Many of their warriors I slew.

Although its exact location is unknown, Shalamaneser III's placement of Sugunia near "the sea of Nairi" has led some scholars to place it near Lake Van or near Lake Urmia.

After Sugunia was sacked and burnt by Shalmaneser III, Arame moved his capital to Arzashkun, which was subsequently attacked by the Assyrians in 856 BC.
