= Sarduri I =

King of Urartu
- Reign: c. 834–828 BC
- Predecessor: Arame or Lutipri
- Successor: Ishpuini
- Issue: Ishpuini
- Father: Lutipri

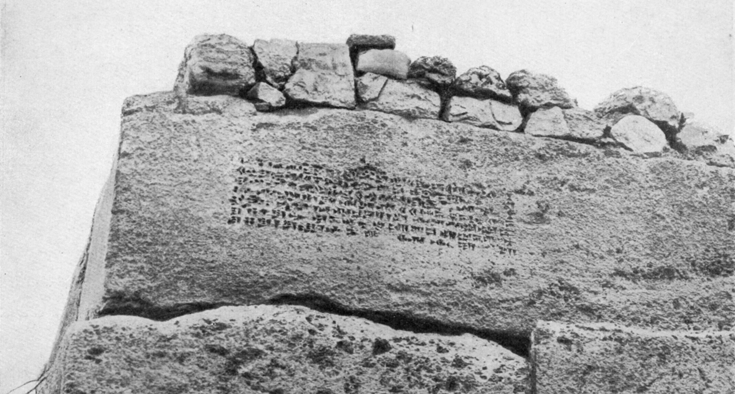
Assyrian inscription on the fortress constructed by Sarduri I, king of Urartu.

Sarduri I (ruled: 834 BC – 828 BC), also known as Sarduris, Sedur, and Asiduri, was king of Urartu. He was known as Ishtarduri to the Assyrians.

It is unclear whether Sarduri's father, Lutipri, was a king of Urartu. It is possible that Lutipri was not a king and that Sarduri established a new dynasty.

Sarduri I is most known for moving the capital of the Urartu kingdom to Tushpa (Van). This proved to be significant as Tushpa became the focal point of politics in the Near East. His kingdom was influenced by the Neo-Assyrian Empire through architecture, royal titles, and the usage of Akkadian language in early Urartian inscriptions.

He was succeeded by his son, Ishpuini of Urartu, who then expanded the kingdom.

The title Sarduri used was 'King of the Four Quarters'.

It has been suggested that the name Sarduri comes from Sardi dur, meaning "given by Sardi." Sardi was the Urartian equivalent of Ishtar, and the name Sarduri was written as "Ishtarduri" in Assyrian sources. The duri suffix would be a form of Armenian tur (տուր), meaning "given by," comparable to Greek dôron (δῶρον), meaning "gift."

== See also ==
- List of kings of Urartu

== Sources ==
- Liverani, Mario (2013). The Ancient Near East: History, Society and Economy. Taylor & Francis.521-522
- Sasson, Jack M. (1995). Civilizations of the Ancient Near East. Vol. 4. Scribner.
