= Arame of Urartu =

Arame

King of Urartu
- Reign: 9th century BC
- Predecessor: Kingdom established
- Successor: Lutipri or Sarduri I

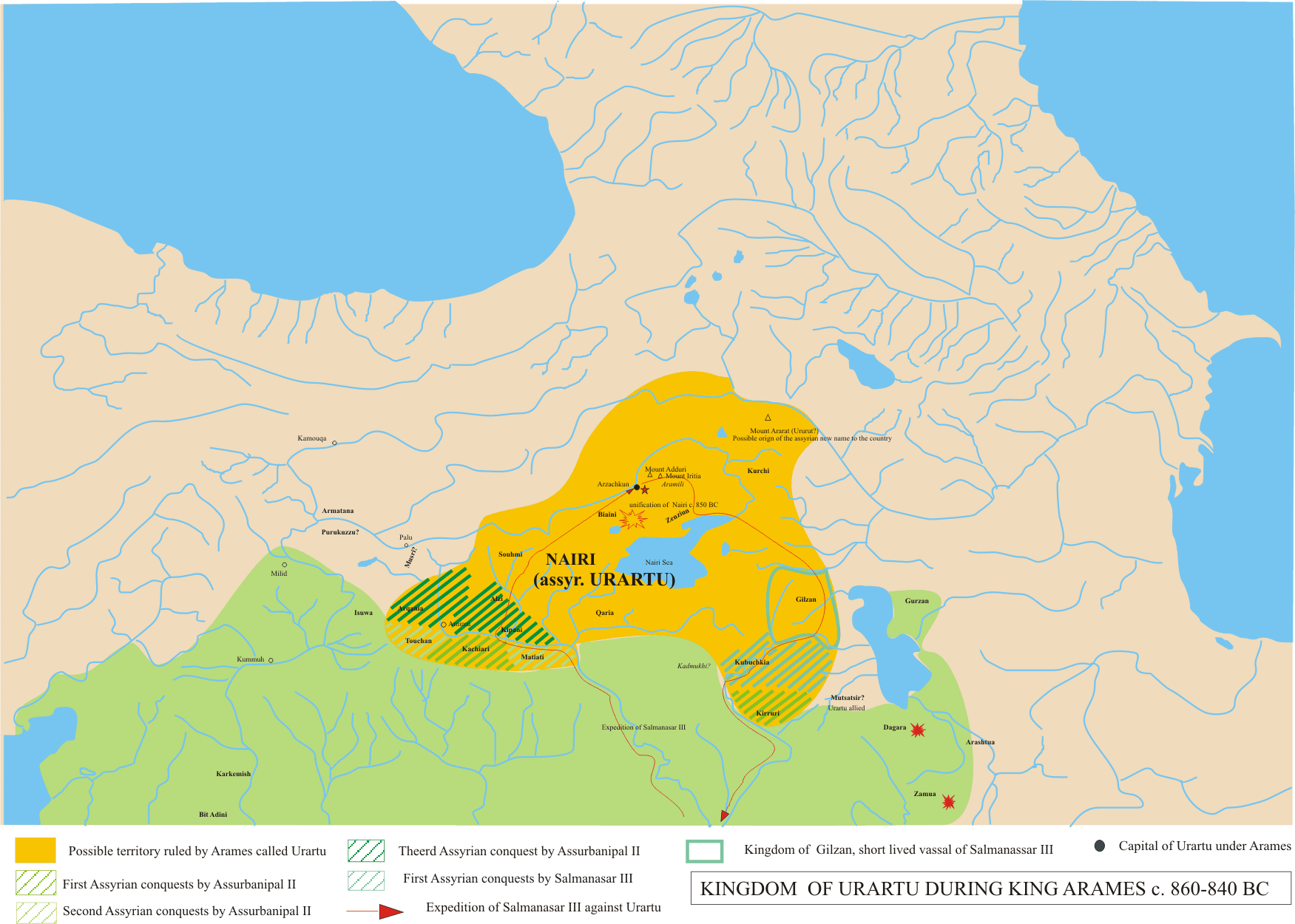
Urartu under Aramu

Arame or Aramu (r. c. 858 – 844 BC) was the first known king of the state of Urartu.

Living at the time of King Shalmaneser III of the Neo Assyrian Empire (r. 859–824 BC), Arame fought unsuccessfully against the Assyrian Empire. His capital at Arzashkun was captured by Shalmaneser. Sagunia, a previous capital, which was also captured by Shalamaneser, seems to have been located in the vicinity of Lake Van or Lake Urmia. Subsequent Urartian rulers probably came from a different dynasty than Arame.

Arame has been suggested as the prototype of both Aram (and, correspondingly the popular given name Aram) and Ara the Beautiful, two of the legendary but not historically attested forefathers of the Armenian people. Khorenatsi's History (1.5) puts them six and seven generations after Hayk.

It has been hypothesized that Aramu was a military leader of Aramean origin, the earliest recording of the name Aram referring to the Semitic speaking Aramean people of the Levant and southern Anatolia, appearing during the 13th century BC. Philologist Armen Petrosyan writes that Aramu might be identified with the legendary Armenian Aram, and proposes that Aramu may have been named after the Armenian or related deity *Aram-. Petrosyan further writes, "Bearing in mind the Armenian etymologies of the names of the first king of Urartu Aramu and one of his royal cities Arṣašku, one may conclude that the first king of Urartu was an Armenian ruler and the Armenians inhabited Arṣašku."

He is not to be confused with another king Aramu (also known as Adramu and Atarsamek), and Aramean king who ruled at the same time in Bit Agusi and also fought Shalemaneser III.

== See also ==
- List of kings of Urartu
