= Kelashin =

Coordinates: 36°54′N 44°53′E

Kelashin (Kurdish: Kelaşin ,که‌لاشن) is a mountain village in Kurdistan Region Iraq, near the Kelashin Pass (2,981m) to Iran, some 80 km south-west of Lake Urmia.

The Kelashin Stele found there bears an important Urartian-Assyrian bilingual text dating to c. 800 BC.
