= Tushpa =

Ruined capital city of Urartu

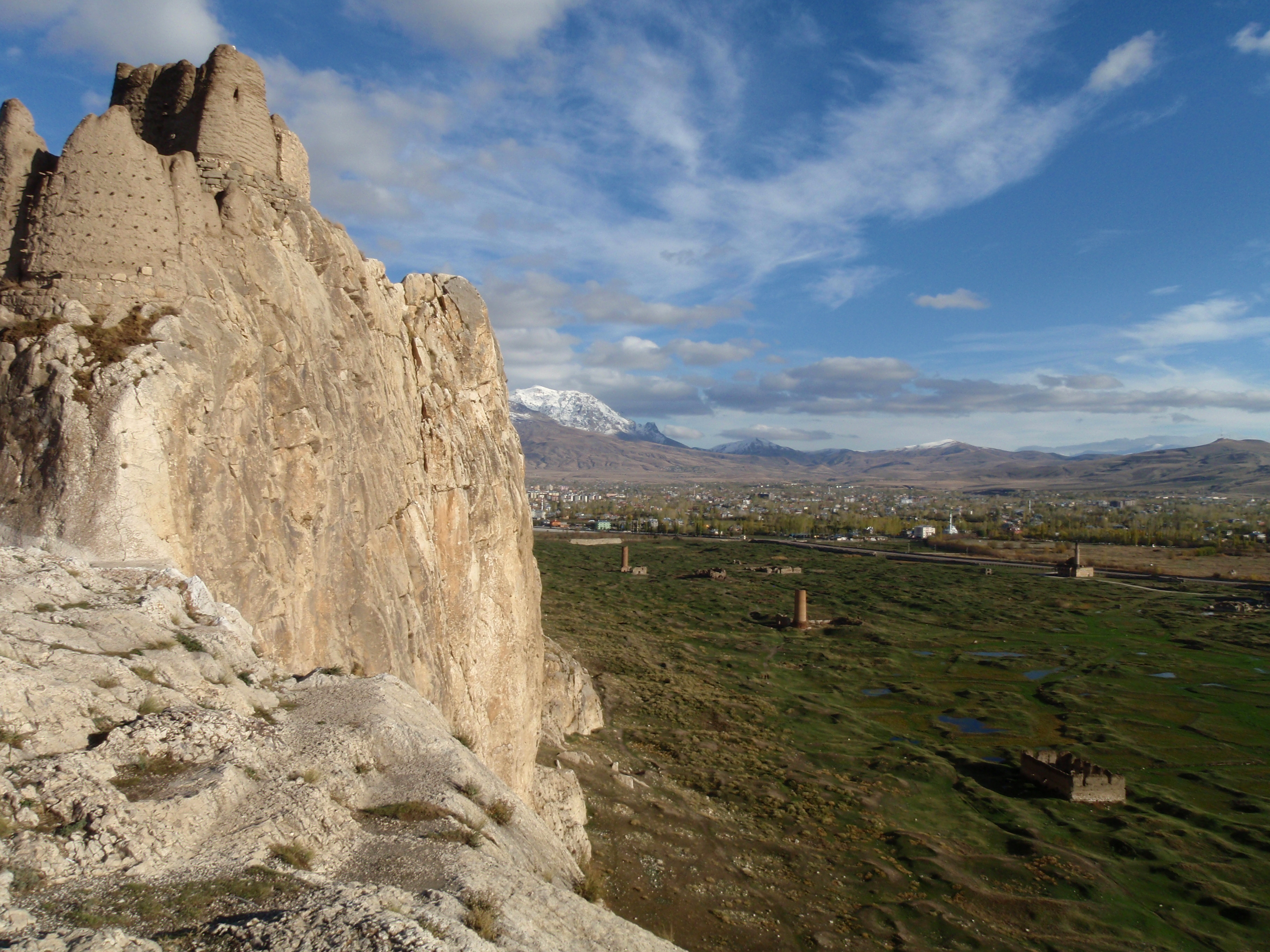
- The citadel of Van and the ruins of Tushpa below

- Location within Turkey
- 38°30′00″N 43°20′33″E
- Location: Turkey
- Region: Van Province

Tushpa (Armenian: Տոսպ, Տուշպա֊Վան Tosp, Tushpa-Van, Akkadian: Turuspa, from Urartian tur-, to destroy i.e. victorious) was the 9th-century BC capital of Urartu, later becoming known as Van which is derived from Biainili, the native name of Urartu. The ancient ruins are located just west of modern-day Van, Turkey and east of Lake Van in Van Province. In 2016 it was inscribed in the Tentative list of World Heritage Sites in Turkey.

It was possibly pronounced as "Tospa" in ancient times as there was no symbolic O equivalent in Akkadian cuneiform so the symbol used for U was frequently substituted.

== History ==
Archaeological excavations and surveys carried out in the Van Province indicate that the history of human settlement in this region dates back at least as far as 5000 BC. The Mound located along the shores of Lake Van and a few kilometres to the south of the citadel of Van, is the only known source of information about the oldest cultures of Van contributing to the founding of Tushpa.

=== Urartian Kingdom ===
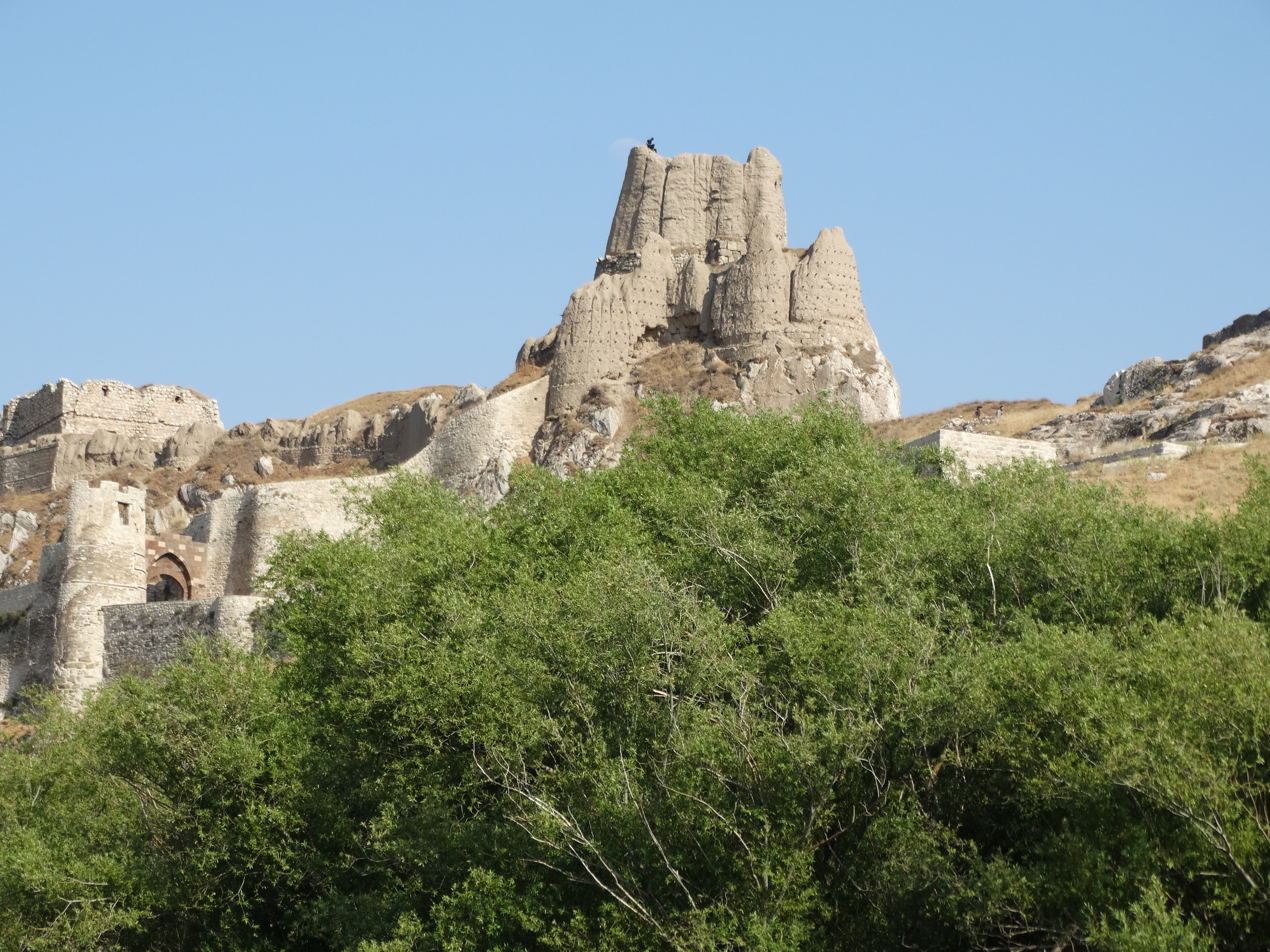
The Van Citadel

Tushpa was the capital of the Urartian kingdom in the 9th century BC. The early settlement was centered upon the steep-sided bluff now referred to as Van Fortress (Van Kalesi), not far from the shores of Lake Van and a few kilometers west of the modern city of Van.

The fortress of Van is a massive stone fortification built by the ancient kingdom of Urartu and held from the 9th to 7th centuries BC. It overlooks Tushpa, and is the largest example of this kind of complex. A number of similar fortifications were built throughout the Urartian kingdom, usually cut into hillsides and outcrops in places where modern-day Armenia, Turkey and Iran meet. Successive groups such as the Armenians, Romans, Medes, Achaemenid and Sassanid Persians, Arabs, Seljuqs, Ottomans and Russians each controlled the fortress at one time or another.

The lower parts of the walls of Van Citadel were constructed of unmortared basalt, while the rest was built from mud-bricks. Such fortresses were used for regional control, rather than as a defense against foreign armies. The ancient ruins of the fortress support walls constructed during the medieval era. Other cuneiform inscriptions have been found at the site and are typically off limits unless to large tour groups due to vandalism.

In the trilingual Behistun inscription, carved in the order of Darius the Great of Persia, the country referred to as Urartu in Babylonian is called Armenia in Old Persian.

=== Orontid dynasty of Armenia and Persian Empire ===
Inscription of Xerxes the Great near the Van Citadel

The region came under the control of the Orontid dynasty of Armenia in the 7th century BC and later Persians in the mid-6th century BC.

A stereotyped trilingual inscription of Xerxes the Great of the 5th century BC is inscribed upon a smoothed section of the rock face, some 20 metres (66 feet) above the ground near the fortress of Van. The niche was originally carved out by Xerxes' father King Darius in the 6th–5th century, but left the surface blank. The inscription is written in 27 lines in Old Persian, Babylonian, and Elamite. The inscription reads:

"A great god is Ahuramazda, the greatest of the gods, who created this earth, who created yonder sky, who created man, created happiness for man, who made Xerxes king, one king of many, one lord of many.

I (am) Xerxes, the great king, king of kings, king of all kinds of people, king on this earth far and wide, the son of Darius the king, the Achaemenid.
Xerxes the great king proclaims: King Darius, my father, by the favor of Ahuramazda, made much that is good, and this niche he ordered to be cut; as he did not have an inscription written, then I ordered that this inscription be written.
Me may Ahuramazda protect, together with the gods, and my kingdom and what I have done."

When it was published by Eugène Burnouf in 1836, through his realization that it included a list of the satrapies of Darius (repeated by Xerxes in nearly identical language), he was able to identify and publish an alphabet of thirty letters, most of which he had correctly deciphered. Burnouf's reading of the Van trilingual inscription had made a significant contribution to the deciphering of Old Persian cuneiform.

=== Alexander the Great, the Seleucid Empire and the Kingdom of Armenia ===
In 331 BC, Tushpa was conquered by Alexander the Great and after his death became part of the Seleucid Empire. By the early 2nd century BC it was part of the Kingdom of Armenia. It became an important center during the reign of the Artaxiad Armenian king, Tigranes II, who founded the city of Tigranakert in the 1st century BC. This region was ruled by the Arsacid dynasty of Armenia before the 4th century AD. In the History of Armenia attributed to Moses of Chorene, the city is called Tosp, from Urartian Tushpa.

=== Byzantine Empire and Kingdom of Vaspurakan ===
The Byzantine Empire briefly held the region from 628 to 640, after which it was invaded by the Muslim Arabs, who consolidated their conquests as the province of Ermeniye. Decline in Arab power eventually allowed local Armenian rulers to re-emerge, with the Artsruni dynasty soon becoming the most powerful. Initially dependent on the rulers of the Kingdom of Ani, they declared their independence in 908, founding the kingdom of Vaspurakan. The kingdom had no specific capital: the court would move as the king transferred his residence from place to place, such as Van city, Vostan, Aghtamar, etc. In 1021 the last king of Vaspurakan, John-Senekerim Artsruni, ceded his entire kingdom to the Byzantine empire, who established the Vaspurakan theme on the former Artsruni territories.

=== Seljuq Empire ===
Incursions by the Seljuq Turks into Vaspurakan started in the 1050s. After their victory in 1071 at the battle of Manzikert the entire region fell under their control. After them, local Muslim rulers emerged, such as the Ahlatshahs and the Ayyubids (1207). For a 20-year period, Van was held by the Anatolian Seljuq Sultanate until the 1240s when it was conquered by the Mongols. In the 14th century, Van was held by the Kara Koyunlu, and later by the Timurids.

=== Ottoman Empire ===
The first half of the 15th century saw the Van region become a land of conflict as it was disputed by the Ottoman Empire and the Persian Safavid Empire. The Safavids captured Van in 1502. The Ottomans took the city in 1515 and held it for a short period. The Safavids took it again in 1520 and the Ottomans gained final and definite control of the city in 1548. They first made Van into a sanjak dependent on the Erzurum eyalet, and later into a separate Van eyalet in about 1570.

Towards the second half of the 19th century Van began to play an increased role in the politics of the Ottoman Empire due to its location near the borders of the Persian, Russian and Ottoman Empire, as well as its proximity to Mosul.

== Sources ==
- Dusinberre, Elspeth R. M. (2013). Empire, Authority, and Autonomy in Achaemenid Anatolia. Cambridge University Press. ISBN 978-1107577152.
- Khatchadourian, Lori (2016). Imperial Matter: Ancient Persia and the Archaeology of Empires. University of California Press. ISBN 978-0520964952.
- Kuhrt, Amélie (2007). The Persian Empire: A Corpus of Sources from the Achaemenid Period. Routledge. ISBN 978-0415552790.
