= ASİMKK =

Turkish government agency

ASİMKK (Turkish: Asılsız Soykırım İddiaları ile Mücadele Koordinasyon Kurulu; English: Committee to Coordinate the Struggle with the Baseless Genocide Claims or Coordinating Council against Baseless Genocide Allegations) was a Turkish government agency under the National Security Council devoted to coordinating efforts against Armenian genocide recognition that operated in the 2000s and 2010s. Set up due to international pressures for genocide recognition in May 2001, the agency was jointly chaired by the Foreign Minister of Turkey and the secretary general of the National Security Council. The agency's goal was to centralize Turkish efforts to promote Armenian genocide denial in public opinion both in Turkey and internationally. Beginning in 2002 with Abdullah Gül, the prime minister of Turkey was the ex officio head of the organization. The body included high-level representation from the Ministry of Defense, Ministry of Justice, Ministry of the Interior, Foreign Ministry, Ministry of National Education, the Turkish Historical Society, and the Directorate General of the State Archives.

In 2002, ASİMKK recommended that the Turkish Historical Society (TTK) increase the number of publications devoted to denying the 1915 genocide, which resulted in the TTK establishing an Armenian desk and an explosion in denialist publications. One of ASİMKK's working groups was the National Education Working Group, which focused on educating Turkish schoolchildren with the official narrative of the Armenian genocide. The agency also monitored recognition of Assyrian genocide and Greek genocide during World War I. Marc Mamigonian comments, "Turkey is thus perhaps the only state with an official or semiofficial entity devoted exclusively to events that it maintains did not occur." Ragıp Zarakolu said in 2009 that the agency should be shut down.

ASİMKK disappeared after the 2017 Turkish constitutional referendum and consequent reconfiguration of Turkey as a presidential system. In June 2020, it was announced that Turkey would form a new organization to replace ASİMKK in combatting "groundless and anti-Turkey allegations regarding the events of 1915", which were described by Hurriyet Daily News as one of "Turkey's main foreign policy issues".
