= Armenian genocide recognition =

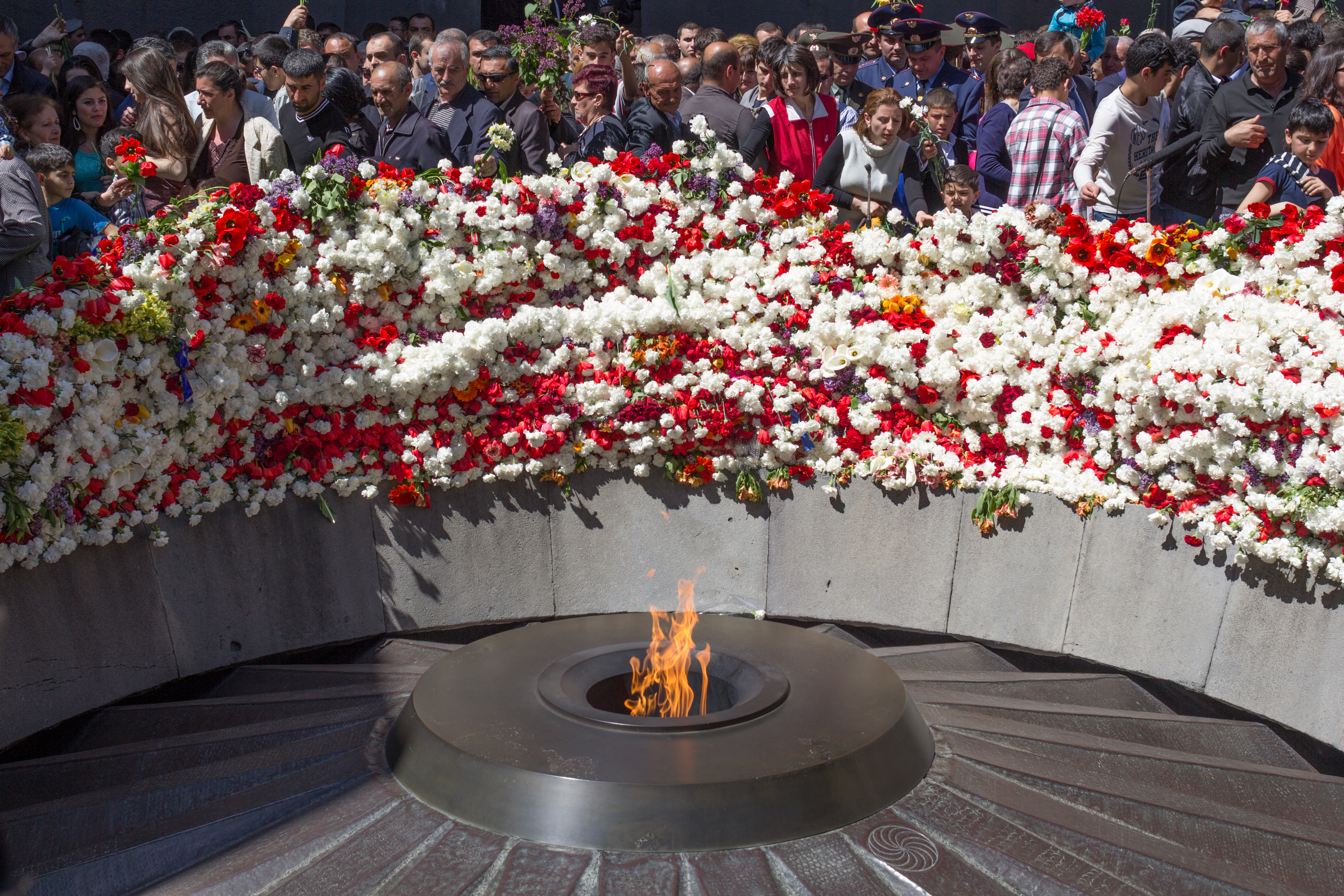
The eternal flame at the center of the twelve slabs, located at the Armenian Genocide Memorial complex in Yerevan, Armenia

The recognition of the Armenian genocide is the acknowledgement of the fact that the Ottoman Empire's systematic massacres and forced deportation of Armenians from 1915 to 1923, both during and after the First World War, constituted genocide.

Outside of Turkey and Azerbaijan, the historical consensus is that the Ottoman Empire's persecution of Armenians was a genocide. Despite this consensus, some governments have been reticent to officially acknowledge the killings as genocide, due to political concerns regarding their relations with the Turkish government.

The Turkish government has demanded Armenia abandon genocide recognition efforts as a condition for normalizing diplomatic relations and lifting the ongoing Turkish-Azeri blockade of Armenia. In contrast, Armenia has consistently advocated for establishing diplomatic relations with Turkey and reopening the border without any preconditions.

As of 2026, the governments and parliaments of 34 countries, including Argentina, Austria, Brazil, Canada, France, Germany, Greece, Italy, Mexico, the Netherlands, Poland, Portugal, Russia, Sweden, the United States and Uruguay, have formally recognized the Armenian genocide, Uruguay having been the first nation to do so. The governments of Azerbaijan, Turkey, and Pakistan deny the genocide.

== Opinion polls ==
In 2015, the Foundation for the Memory of the Shoah and Fondapol surveyed 31,172 people between the ages of 16 and 29 living in 31 countries, asking, "In your view, can we talk about genocide in relation to the massacre of the Armenians, by the Turks, in 1915?" 77% of respondents answered in the affirmative. The highest percentage was for France with 93% agreeing and the lowest percentage was for Turkey, with 33% agreeing.

== International organizations ==
=== United Nations ===
==== The 1948 UN War Crimes Commission Report ====
On May 15, 1948, the United Nations Economic and Social Council presented a 384-page report prepared by the United Nations War Crimes Commission (UNWCC), set up in London (October 1943) to collect and collate information on war crimes and war criminals. The report, presented by Lebanese representative Karim Azkoul, was a response to the request by the UN Secretary-General to make arrangements for "the collection and publication of information concerning human rights arising from trials of war criminals, quislings and traitors, and in particular from the Nuremberg and Tokyo Trials." The report had been prepared by members of the legal staff of the commission. The report is highly topical in regard to the Armenian genocide, not only because it uses the 1915 events as a historic example, but also as a precedent to Articles 6 (c) and 5 (c) of the Nuremberg and Tokyo Charters, and thereby as a precursor to the then newly adopted UN Genocide Convention, differentiating between war crimes and crimes against humanity. By referring to the information collected during WWI and put forward by the 1919 Commission of Responsibilities, the report entitled "Information Concerning Human Rights Arising from Trials of War Criminals" used the Armenian case as a vivid example of crimes committed by a state against its own citizens.

The report also noted that while the Paris Peace Treaties with Germany, Austria, Hungary and Bulgaria, did not include any reference to "laws of humanity", instead basing the charges on violations of "laws and customs of war", the Sèvres Peace Treaty with Turkey did so. In addition according to Armenian-Swedish historian Avedian Vahagn, Articles 226-228 also did, concerning customs of war (corresponding to Articles 228-230 of the Treaty of Versailles), the Sèvres Treaty also contained an additional Article 230, obviously in compliance with the Allied ultimatum of May 24, 1915, in regard to "crimes [committed] against humanity and civilization".

==== The 1985 UN Genocide Report, the "Whitaker Report" ====
In 1985, the United Nations Sub-Commission on Prevention of Discrimination and Protection of Minorities received a report from Special Rapporteur and Sub-Commission member Benjamin Whitaker (United Kingdom) entitled Revised and Updated Report on the Question of the Prevention and Punishment of the Crime of Genocide (commonly known as The Whitaker Report), in which the systematic Ottoman massacre of Armenians during World War I was cited as meeting the criteria for the UN definition of genocide and as one of the genocides of the 20th century. His report was received and noted by a resolution at the 38th session of the Sub-Commission in 1985.

=== Catholic Church ===
In 2015, Pope Francis said that the Armenian genocide was "considered the first genocide of the 20th century." The word was not used again, due to strong Turkish backlash, until June 2016, when he reaffirmed and solidified his stance on it constituting a genocide and strongly condemned the enduring denial of the genocide. Turkey responded by accusing the Pope of having a "crusader mentality" against the country. The Vatican strongly denied this, claiming that the Pope had actually called for reconciliation between Armenians and Turks.

=== International Association of Genocide Scholars ===
In 1997, the International Association of Genocide Scholars (IAGS) passed a resolution unanimously recognizing the Ottoman massacres of Armenians as genocide.

=== International Center for Transitional Justice ===
In February 2002, an independent legal opinion commissioned by Turkish Armenian Reconciliation Commission and published by the International Center for Transitional Justice concluded that the Ottoman massacre of Armenians in 1915–1918 were a genocide, but that no legal consequences flowed from this fact because genocide was only criminalized in international law after the ratification of the Genocide Convention.

In 2007, the Elie Wiesel Foundation for Humanity wrote a letter signed by 53 Nobel laureates re-affirming the Genocide Scholars' conclusion that the 1915 killings of Armenians constituted genocide. Wiesel's organization also asserted that Turkish acknowledgement of the Armenian genocide would create no legal "basis for reparations or territorial claims", anticipating Turkish anxieties that it could prompt financial or territorial claims.

=== European Parliament ===
On April 15, 2015, the European Parliament backed a motion that calls the massacre of up to 1.5 million Armenians by Ottoman Turkish forces a genocide and urged for a restoration of diplomatic relations, days after Pope Francis's message triggered an angry reaction in Turkey for using the same term. It had previously done so in 1987, 2000, 2002 and 2005.

The European Parliament commended the message the pontiff had delivered. Prior to the vote, Turkish president Erdoğan declared that "Turkey will ignore any decision by the European parliament", and that "I personally don't bother about a defence because [Turks] don't carry a stain or a shadow like genocide".

=== Council of Europe ===
The Council of Europe passed a resolution on the Armenian genocide on May 14, 2001, which commits only the members who signed it, and appeals "to all the members of the Parliamentary Assembly of the Council of Europe to take the necessary steps for the recognition of the genocide perpetrated by the Ottoman Empire against the Armenians at the beginning of the 20th century."

=== American Jewish organizations ===
On November 7, 1989, the Union for Reform Judaism passed a resolution on recognition of the Armenian genocide.

In 2007 the Anti-Defamation League declared the following press statement:

We have never negated but have always described the painful events of 1915–1918 perpetrated by the Ottoman Empire against the Armenians as massacres and atrocities. On reflection, we have come to share the view of Henry Morgenthau, Sr. that the consequences of those actions were indeed tantamount to genocide. If the word genocide had existed then, they would have called it genocide.

In 2014 the American Jewish Committee recognized the Armenian genocide as a historical fact.

In October 2015, the Jewish Council for Public Affairs published a resolution calling on the U.S. government to recognize the World War I-era Turkish massacres of Armenians as a genocide.

=== Central Council of Jews in Germany ===
In April 2015, the Central Council of Jews in Germany called on the German government to recognize the World War I mass murder of over one million Armenians in what was then the Ottoman Empire as a genocide. "One hundred years ago, the government of the Ottoman Empire ordered the deportation of one million Armenians. They were murdered directly, or died of starvation and dehydration in the desert," Central Council President Josef Schuster told the newspaper Der Tagesspiegel. He added: "These terrible events should be called what they were: a genocide." Schuster said the Armenian genocide later served Adolf Hitler and his Nazis as a blueprint for the Holocaust.

=== Other ===
Other organizations which have recognized the Armenian genocide include:

- World Council of Churches
- European Green Party
- Mercosur Parliament
- Latin American Parliament
- Interparliamentary Assembly on Orthodoxy
- European Alliance of YMCAs
- Andean Parliament
- Centrist Democrat International
- Central American Parliament
- Global Greens
- Permanent Peoples' Tribunal
- Human Rights Association (Turkey)
- Auschwitz Institute for the Prevention of Genocide and Mass Atrocities
- Peoples' Democratic Party (Turkey)

== Parliaments and governments ==
Turkey continues to insist that the mass killings of 1915 were not a genocide, a fact which many Europeans take as casting doubt on the Turkish nation's commitment to human rights, causing them to oppose European Union membership a stance for which Turkish-Armenian intellectual Hrant Dink publicly issued condemnation to some countries before he was assassinated in 2007.

=== Countries ===
Countries that have recognized the genocide by a resolution in their national legislature Countries that explicitly deny that there was an Armenian genocide

On May 24, 1915, during World War I, the Allied Powers (the United Kingdom, France and Russia) jointly issued a statement in which they said that for approximately a month, the Kurdish and Turkish populations of Armenia had been massacring Armenians, with the connivance and often assistance of Ottoman authorities, and that the Allied Powers would hold all officers of the Ottoman Government implicated in such crimes personally responsible for crimes against humanity.

On April 20, 1965, Uruguay became the first nation in the world to officially recognize the Armenian genocide. During the second half of the 20th century and the 21st century, parliaments of several countries have formally recognized the event as genocide. Turkish entry talks with the European Union were met with a number of calls to consider the event as genocide, though it never became a precondition.

As of June 2026, 36 states had officially recognized the historical events as genocide. Sovereign nations (i.e. UN member-states) officially recognizing the Armenian genocide are:

| Country | Year(s) of recognition | Notes |
|---|---|---|
| Argentina | 1993, 2003, 2004, 2005, 2006, 2007 | |
| Armenia | 1988 | Recognition extended by the Armenian SSR. |
| Austria | 2015 | |
| Belgium | 1998, 2015 | |
| Bolivia | 2014 | The resolution was approved unanimously by both the Senate and the Chamber of Deputies, with the approval of the Foreign Ministry. |
| Brazil | 2015 | The resolution was approved by the Federal Senate. |
| Bulgaria | 2015 | The declaration was adopted by the Bulgarian parliament on April 24, 2015, using the phrase "mass extermination of the Armenian People in the Ottoman Empire" and declares April 24 as a Victims Remembrance Day. Regarding the usage of "mass extermination" the Bulgarian Prime Minister Boyko Borisov has specified the following: "I said it very clearly: this is the Bulgarian word or the Bulgarian words, or the Bulgarian idiom for 'genocide.'" |
| Canada | 1996, 2002, 2004, 2006 | |
| Chile | 2007, 2015 | |
| Cyprus | 1975, 1982, 1990 | The first country to raise the issue to the United Nations General Assembly. Denial of the genocide is criminalized in Cyprus. |
| Czechia | 2017, 2020 | On April 14, 2015, Czech Committee on Foreign Affairs of the Chamber of Deputies passed a resolution on the occasion of the Armenian Genocide Centenary. On April 25, 2017 Czech Parliament approved a resolution condemning the Armenian genocide. On May 20, 2020, the Czech Senate unanimously adopted a resolution recognizing the Armenian genocide. |
| France | 1998, 2001 | On February 5, 2019, French president Emmanuel Macron declared April 24 as Armenian genocide commemoration day in France. |
| Germany | 2005, 2016 | Resolution passed first reading in April 2015. On June 2, 2016, the German Bundestag almost unanimously (with one vote against and one abstention) passed a resolution qualifying the Ottoman-era Armenian killings 'genocide'. |
| Greece | 1996 | Denial of the genocide is criminalized. Punishable by up to 3 years in prison and a fine not to exceed €30,000, per 2014 act. |
| Italy | 2000, 2019 | Denial of genocides is criminalized. It stipulates 3-year imprisonment and a fine. On April 10, 2019, the Italian Chamber of Deputies adopted an initiative calling on the Italian government to recognize the Armenian genocide and give the issue an international dimension. |
| Latvia | 2021 | On May 6, 2021, the Latvian Parliament, or Saeima, approved a resolution recognizing the Armenian genocide by 58 to 11 votes with 7 abstentions. |
| Libya | 2019 | The Eastern-based interim administration's Council of Ministers has adopted a proposal from Abdelhady Alhweij, its foreign minister, to recognize the Armenian genocide. Libya is the third Arab (the other two being Lebanon and Syria) and the first African state to recognize the genocide. According to the Armenian ministry of Foreign Affairs, Libya currently doesn't recognize the genocide. |
| Lithuania | 2005 | On December 16, 2005, the Lithuanian Parliament, or Seimas, approved a resolution recognizing the Armenian genocide. |
| Lebanon | 1997, 2000 | On May 11, 2000, the Lebanese Parliament unanimously approved a resolution calling for the commemoration of the 85th anniversary of the Armenian genocide perpetrated by the Ottoman Turkish government at the beginning of the century. The resolution, presented by the parliament executive, calls on all Lebanese citizens to unite with the Armenian people on April 24 in commemorating the atrocities of 1915–1923. |
| Luxembourg | 2015 | The Chamber of Deputies unanimously adopted a resolution on the recognition of the genocide of Armenian people. |
| Mexico | 2023 | On February 8, 2023, the Mexican Senate adopted a document on Armenian Genocide recognition citing the need to protect universal human rights. |
| Netherlands | 2004, 2015, 2018 | The Dutch government will send a Minister or State Secretary to Armenia to attend Armenian Genocide Remembrance Day every five years, starting in 2018. |
| Paraguay | 2015 | The Chamber of Senators in Paraguay unanimously adopted the resolution. |
| Poland | 2005 | The Sejm of the Republic of Poland (lower house of the Polish parliament) unanimously passed a bill recognizing the Armenian genocide on April 19, 2005. |
| Portugal | 2019 | On April 26, 2019, the Parliament of Portugal voted for the recognition of the Armenian genocide perpetrated by the Ottoman Empire, with a Vote of Regret N.º 819/XIII. |
| Russia | 1995, 2005, 2015 | |
| Slovakia | 2004 | Denial of the genocide is criminalized. Punishable by up to 5 years in prison, per 2011 act. |
| Sweden | 2010 | Swedish parliament passed a resolution recognizing the Armenian genocide as well as the Assyrian genocide and Greek genocide, but the foreign minister said that this resolution did not reflect the position of the executive branch. Turkey recalled its ambassador from Stockholm. |
| Switzerland | 2003 | Denial of the genocide is criminalized. See also: Perinçek v. Switzerland |
| Syria | 2015, 2020 | On February 13, 2020, the People's Assembly of Syria unanimously adopted a resolution recognizing and condemning the Armenian genocide. |
| United States | 2019, 2021 | The United States Congress officially recognizes the Armenian genocide. The House of Representatives affirmed the United States record on the Armenian genocide with House Resolution 296 on October 29, 2019. The Senate unanimously recognized the genocide with Senate Resolution 150 on December 12, 2019. However, President Donald Trump did not support the resolution, citing that his administration's stance on the issue had not changed. On April 24, 2021, President Joe Biden officially recognized the Armenian genocide. |
| Uruguay | 1965, 2004, 2015 | The first country to recognize the events as genocide. On May 14, 2024, the Chamber of Representatives of Uruguay unanimously approved a bill that declares April 24 of each year as "Armenian Genocide Remembrance Day". |
| Holy See | 2000, 2015 | |
| Venezuela | 2005 | On July 14, 2005, the National Assembly of Venezuela adopted a resolution that recognizes the Armenian genocide. |

=== States, regions, provinces, municipalities and parliamentary committees ===
Recognition of the Armenian genocide also includes:

Australia

Parliaments of 3 Australian states recognize the Armenian genocide:

- New South Wales: In 2007 the Parliament of the State of New South Wales passed a motion condemning the genocide and called on the Australian Federal Government to do the same.
- South Australia: In March 2009 the Parliament of South Australia passed a similar motion to that passed in New South Wales in 2007.
- Tasmania: On May 11, 2023, the House Assembly of the State of Tasmania unanimously passed a motion recognizing and condemning the Armenian, Greek, and Assyrian Genocides of 1915.

Additionally, the City of Ryde adopted a unanimous motion dedicated to the centenary of the Armenian genocide at its Council Meeting on April 14, 2015. The motion further calls upon the Government of Australia to recognize and condemn all genocides. The City of Willoughby passed a motion recognizing the Armenian genocide on May 11, 2015. The City of Parramatta unanimously adopted a motion on recognition of the Armenian genocide on April 21, 2025.

Belgium

- Flanders: The Parliament of Flanders adopted a resolution recognizing the Armenian genocide and calling upon Turkey to come to terms with its past.

Brazil

The parliaments of 4 Brazilian states recognize the Armenian genocide:

- Ceará: In 2006, The Legislative Council of State of Ceará, Brazil, unanimously passed a bill which recognizes April 24 as the Day of the Armenian People. Armenian genocide victims will henceforth be commemorated on this day.
- Paraná: In 2013, the parliament of the state of Paraná adopted a bill recognizing the Armenian genocide in the Ottoman Empire.
- Rio de Janeiro: The state of Rio de Janeiro recognized the Armenian genocide on July 24, 2015, with a law setting April 24 as "Day of recognition and memory of the victims of the Armenian Genocide".
- São Paulo: The Legislative Assembly of the largest Brazilian state – São Paulo – passed a law recognizing April 24 as "a Commemoration Day of the 1.5 million victims of the Armenian Genocide in 1915" in 2003.

Bulgaria

- Bulgaria: 7 provinces (oblasts) have recognized the Armenian genocide – first in 2008 was the Plovdiv Province followed by the provinces of Burgas, Ruse, Stara Zagora, Pazardzhik, Haskovo and Svilengrad.

Canada

- Alberta: The Legislative Assembly of Alberta unanimously passed a law which recognizes the Armenian genocide and other genocides in 2021.
- British Columbia: The Legislative Assembly of British Columbia recognized the Armenian genocide.
- Ontario: The Legislative Assembly of Ontario unanimously adopted a resolution recognizing the Armenian genocide in 1980.
- Quebec: Quebec was the first province in Canada to recognize the Armenian genocide in 1980.

Additionally, the cities of Montreal and Toronto recognized the Armenian genocide.

Egypt

- Egypt: In February 2019, the President of Egypt Abdel Fattah el-Sisi addressed his recognition of the Armenian genocide during the 2019 Munich Security Conference and urged for complete recognition of the genocide by Egypt.

France

- Corsica: On April 14, 2015, the Corsican Assembly adopted a resolution recognizing the Armenian genocide.

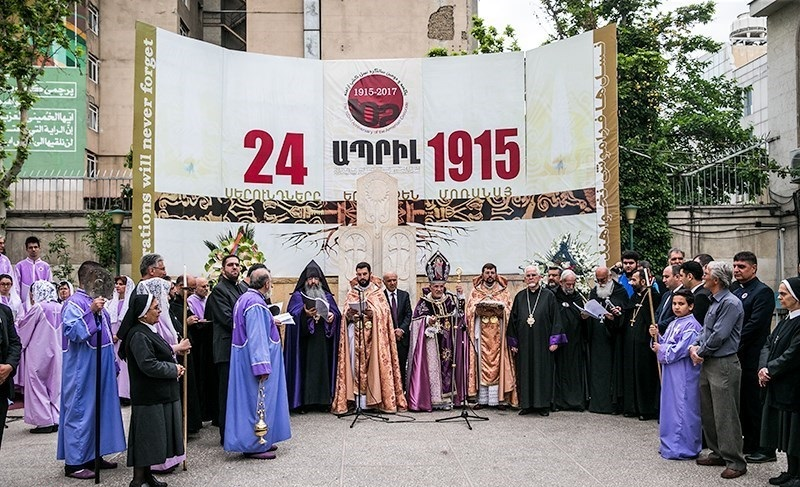
Armenian Genocide Remembrance Day in Saint Sarkis Cathedral, Tehran, 2017 (center: Archbishop Sepuh Sargsyan)

Iran

- Iran: The Tehran regional government recognized the Armenian genocide. Unofficially, the Islamic Republic of Iran has repeatedly recognized the Armenian genocide.

Israel

- Israel: On August 1, 2016, the Knesset's Education, Culture and Sports Committee announced its recognition of the Armenian genocide and urged the Israeli government to formally acknowledge the 1915 mass slaughter of 1.5 million Armenians as such. On March 30, 2023, the City Council of Haifa recognized the genocide and became the second city in Israel to do so, after Petah Tikva. On June 28, 2026, the entire Israeli government recognised the Armenian genocide, marking a break from the country's previous politics.

Italy

Parliaments of 10 Italian regions recognize the Armenian genocide:

- Abruzzo: The Italian region of Abruzzo on October 27, 2015, passed a bill to recognize the Armenian genocide.
- Basilicata: The Regional Council of Basilicata, Italy, unanimously recognized the Armenian genocide on September 27, 2016.
- Emilia-Romagna: The Emilia-Romagna region of Italy adopted on July 28, 2016, a resolution recognizing the Armenian genocide.
- Friuli Venezia Giulia: The Regional Council of Friuli Venezia Giulia unanimously adopted a resolution recognizing the Armenian genocide on May 20, 2021.
- Lazio: The Regional Council of Lazio in Italy unanimously adopted a motion on recognition of the Armenian genocide on March 18, 2019.
- Lombardy: The Regional Council of Lombardy in Italy unanimously adopted a motion on recognition and commemoration of the Armenian genocide on April 14, 2015.
- Marche: The Regional Council of Marche, Italy, unanimously recognized the Armenian genocide on October 6, 2015.
- Piedmont: On March 31, 2015, the Regional Council of Piedmont in Italy adopted a motion on recognition and commemoration of the Armenian genocide.
- Sicily: The Sicilian Parliament in Italy unanimously recognized the Armenian genocide on April 20, 2016.
- Tuscany: On March 25, 2015, the Italian region of Tuscany passed a resolution on recognition of the Armenian genocide.

Additionally, almost 100 cities throughout Italy have recognized the Armenian genocide, including Rome, Milan, Turin, Venice, Padua, Florence, Genoa, Livorno, Taranto, Trieste, Ancona, Bergamo, Belluno, Novara, Udine, Pavia, Treviso, Perugia, L'Aquila, Viterbo, Aosta, Rieti, Ravenna, Cesena, Carrara, Lucca, Olbia, Cagliari, Reggio Emilia and Parma.

Mexico

- Michoacán: The Mexican state of Michoacán adopted a statement recognizing and condemning the 1915 Armenian genocide on May 7, 2019.

Netherlands

- Overijssel: The Dutch province of Overijssel adopted a motion recognizing the Armenian genocide.

Philippines

- Manila: A divine liturgy was delivered on September 27, 2016, at Santuario de San Antonio Church in Manila, Philippines, dedicated to the memory of the victims of the Armenian genocide at the initiative of the Armenian Embassy of the Philippines.

Saudi Arabia

- Saudi Arabia: The deterioration of Saudi Arabia–Turkey relations has led to an increase of calling for recognition of the Armenian genocide. In 2019, Saudi Arabia sponsored the U.S. resolution to recognize the Armenian genocide, in which the U.S. Senate eventually recognized. Saudi Arabian ambassador in Lebanon had also paid a visit to the Armenian Genocide Memorial to demonstrate Saudi solidarity to Armenia.

Spain

Parliaments of 6 Spanish regions recognize the Armenian genocide:

- Aragon
- Balearic Islands
- Basque Country
- Catalonia
- Navarre
- La Rioja

Additionally, 44 Spanish cities within 9 regions have recognized the Armenian genocide:

- Andalusia: La Roda de Andalucía, Puente Genil, Benalmádena, Marbella, Málaga, Torremolinos.
- Balearic Islands: Santa Margalida.
- Basque Country: San Sebastián.
- Castile and León: Burgos, Soria.
- Catalonia: Santa Coloma de Gramenet, Sabadell, Sant Hilari Sacalm, Barcelona.
- Community of Madrid: Pinto, Alcorcón.
- Extremadura: Mérida.
- La Rioja: Arnedo.
- Valencian Community: Manises, Mislata, Xirivella, Silla, Burjassot, Betera, Aldaia, Alzira, Carcaixent, Alaquàs, Elda, Paiporta, Alicante, Torrent, Petrer, Villena, Cullera, Sueca, Ontinyent, Valencia, Sagunto, Liria, Alcàsser, Alboraya, Quart de Poblet.

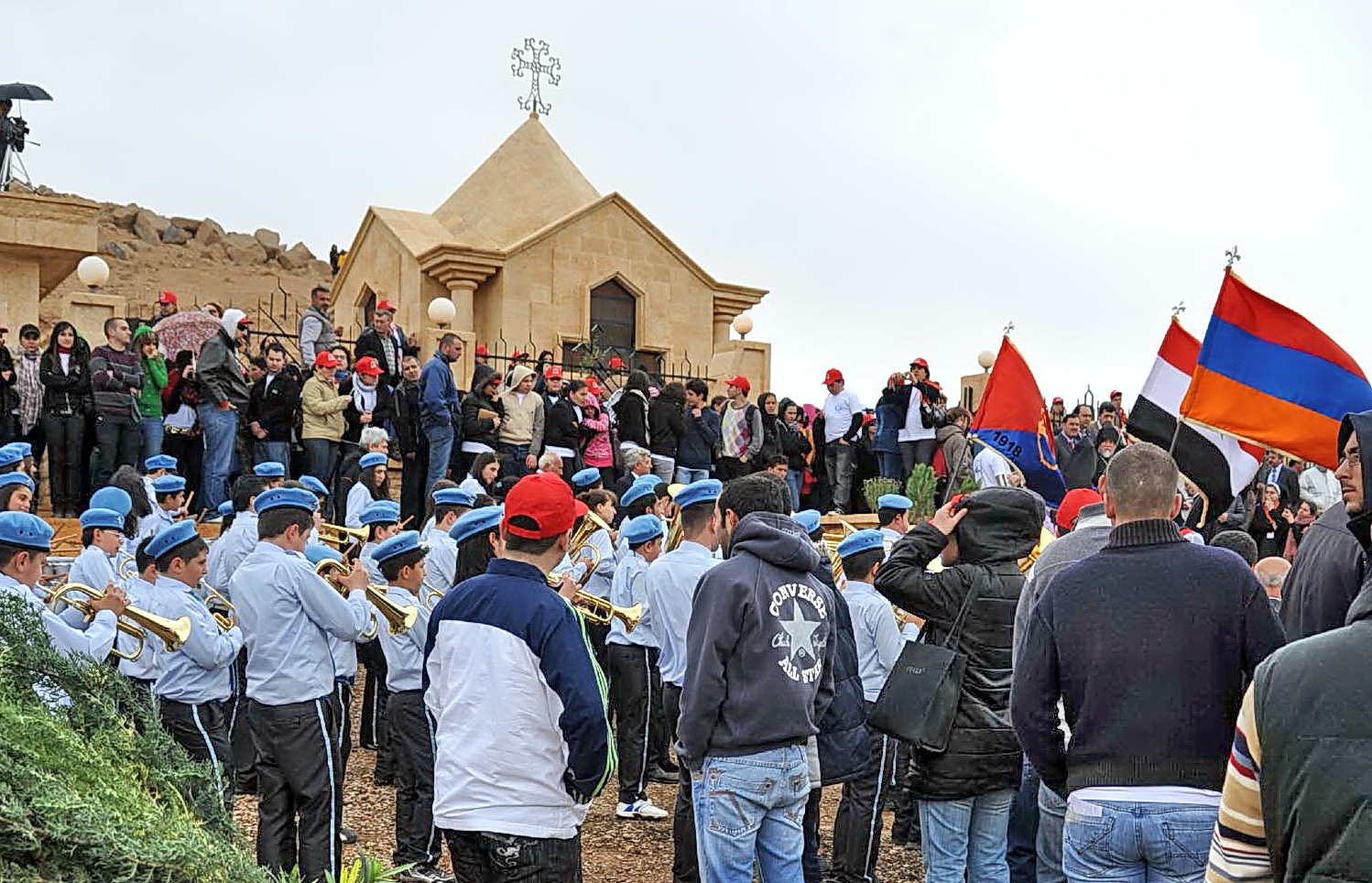
Pilgrims commemorating the 94th anniversary of the Genocide in Margadeh, near Deir ez-Zor in Syria

Switzerland

- Geneva: Government of Swiss canton of Geneva recognized the Armenian genocide of 1915
- Vaud: Swiss Canton of Vaud recognized the Armenian genocide of 1915 in Ottoman Turkey

Ukraine

- Crimea: The Crimean Parliament recognized the Armenian genocide in 2005.

United Arab Emirates

Due to deterioration of relations between Turkey and the United Arab Emirates, the UAE began in April 2019 to slowly recognize the Armenian genocide.

- Abu Dhabi: The Emirate had become the first place in the United Arab Emirates to openly acknowledge the Armenian genocide.

United Kingdom

Two of the three devolved legislatures of the United Kingdom have recognized the Armenian genocide.

- Scotland
- Wales

Additionally, the city of Edinburgh adopted a motion recognizing the Armenian genocide at its Council Meeting on November 17, 2005. The city of Ealing passed a motion on recognition of the Armenian genocide with absolute majority on December 14, 2010. The City of Derby unanimously passed a resolution recognizing the Armenian genocide on November 21, 2018.

United States

- United States: All 50 U.S. states have recognized the Armenian genocide as of 2022. On November 27, 2019, the District of Columbia of the United States adopted a resolution recognizing the Armenian genocide.

Additionally, many counties and cities throughout the United States have officially recognized the Armenian genocide, including Los Angeles, Pasadena, San Francisco, Fresno, Denver, Fort Lauderdale, Atlanta, Minneapolis, Las Vegas, New York City, Pittsburgh, Philadelphia, Memphis, Miami Beach, Dallas, Houston and Austin.

Vietnam

- Vietnam: In 2015, Vietnam's Justice Minister Hà Hùng Cường, on his trip to Yerevan, stated that Vietnam was willing to discuss and recognize the Armenian genocide.

== Positions by countries ==
=== Turkey ===
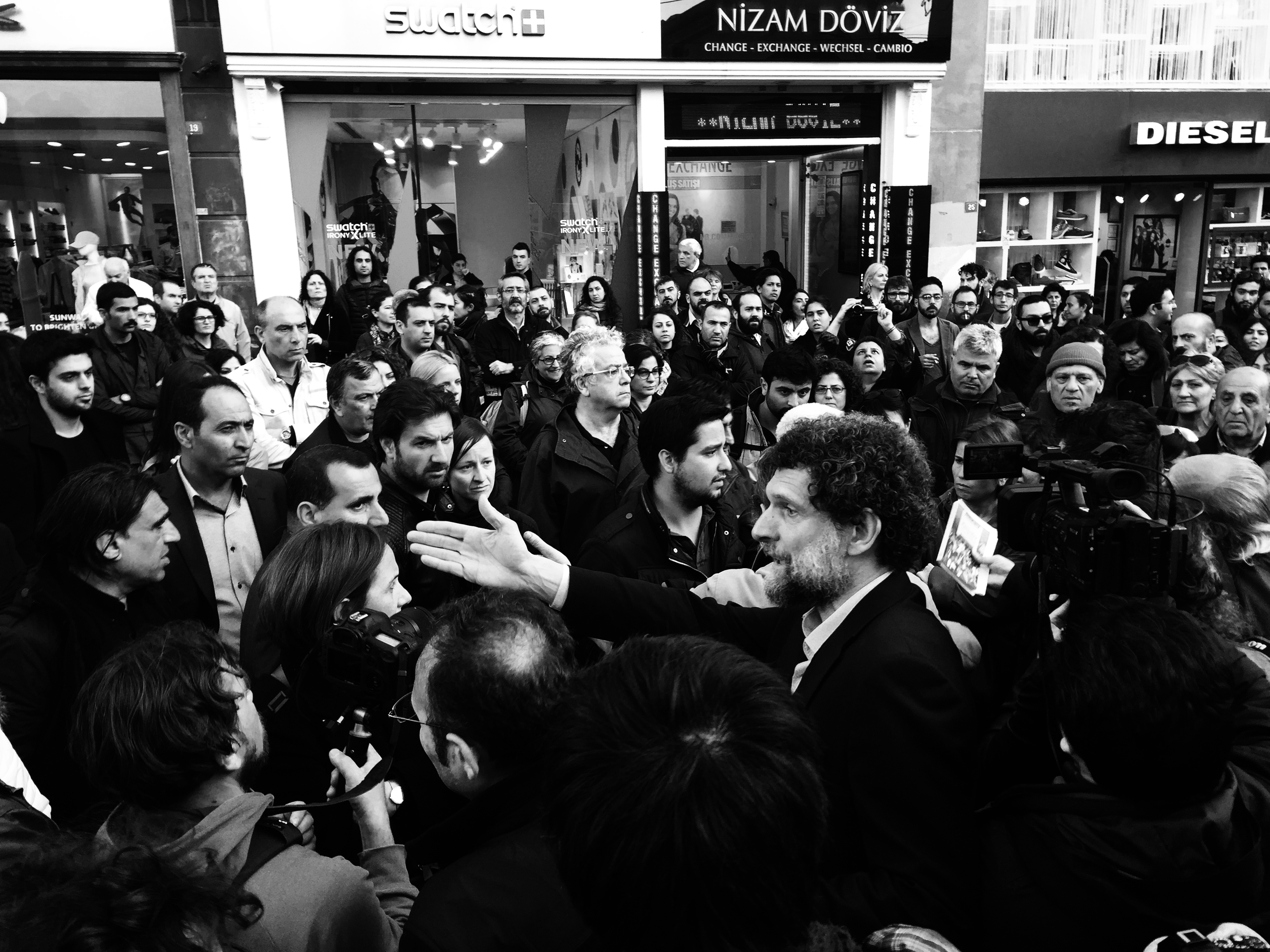
Armenian genocide centennial commemoration near Taksim Square, Istanbul in 2015.

The verdict of the Istanbul trials, held by the Ottoman government in 1919–1920, acknowledged the massacre of Armenians as "war crimes", and sentenced the perpetrators to death. However, in 1921, during the resurgence of the Turkish National Movement, amnesty was given to those found guilty. According to Jason D. Antos, "every other Turkish government" denied the genocide.

A major obstacle for wider recognition of the genocide in the world is the official position of Turkey, which rests on the assumption that the deportation of Armenians was a legitimate state action. According to the Turkish government, the events of 1915 were a "tragedy" that resulted in "the loss of many innocent lives" but they cannot be described as a genocide.

In April 2006, the Turkish Human Rights Association (IHD) recognized the events as a genocide.

In December 2008, a group of Turkish intellectuals launched an online petition – named the "I Apologize" campaign ('Özür Diliyorum' in Turkish) – for people wanting to apologize in a personal capacity. The writers of the petition used the word "the Great Catastrophe" regarding the events. The petition gained upwards of 10,000 signatures in a matter of days. In the face of a backlash, then Turkish president Abdullah Gül defended the petition, citing freedom of speech. An opposition group soon launched a website raising an even higher number of signatures. Recep Tayyip Erdogan, at the time prime minister, denied there was anything to apologize for, but also didn't oppose the campaign and a national debate ensued.

Since the "I Apologize" campaign in 2008, every year on April 24, commemoration ceremonies for the genocide are held in several Turkish cities. They started at Taksim Square in Istanbul in 2008, mainly as a result of the nationwide discussion that came after the assassination of Hrant Dink and then spread to Ankara, Diyarbakır, İzmir, Malatya, and Mersin in the following years. The commemorations draw increasing support each year.

Below are the questions asked and the percentages of the answers given in a 2014 poll for The Centre for Economics and Foreign Policy Studies (EDAM), a Turkish think-tank:

Poll on "Turkey's Potential Policies on the Armenian Issue" (EDAM, 2014)
| Question | % of answers | % of answers (excluding "No idea/No response") | % of answers among Turkish foreign policy experts |
|---|---|---|---|
| Turkey should apologize for the Armenians that lost their lives in 1915 and admit that what happened was a genocide | 9.1% | 12.1% | 18.7% |
| Turkey should apologize for the Armenians that lost their lives in 1915 but should take no other steps | 9.1% | 12.1% | 26.0% |
| Turkey should express its regret over the Armenians that lost their lives in 1915 but should not apologize | 12.0% | 16% | 17.3% |
| Turkey should express that not everyone that lost their lives in 1915 were Armenians and express its regret for all the Ottoman citizens that perished in that period | 23.5% | 31.3% | 36.7% |
| Turkey should take no steps | 21.3% | 28.4% | 1.3% |
| No idea/No response | 25.0% | - | - |
| Total | 100% | 100% | 100% |
| Total "Turkey should apologize for the Armenians that lost their lives in 1915" | 18.2% | 24.3% | 44.7% |
| Total "Turkey should apologize" + "express its regret over the Armenians that lost their lives in 1915" | 30.2% | 34.2% | 62.0% |

Answers to the poll varied greatly depending on the political party, from 4.6% of MHP voters who recognize the Armenian genocide to 24.4% of BDP voters. Excluding "No idea/No response", 51% of CHP voters and 44% of BDP voters answered that "Turkey should apologize for the Armenians that lost their lives" or "Turkey should express its regret over the Armenians that lost their lives in 1915 but should not apologize".

Since 2014, President Erdoğan has sent a message every year on April 24—the Armenian Genocide Remembrance Day—to the Armenian Patriarch of Constantinople, in Turkish and Armenian, to offer his condolences to Armenians for the "events of 1915", without using the word "genocide". It is the first time a Turkish leader has formally offered condolences for the mass killings. In 2021, his message included:

I remember with respect the Ottoman Armenians, who lost their lives under the harsh conditions of the First World War, and offer my condolences to their grandchildren. [...] I thank our Armenian citizens, who are an inseparable part of our nation, for their sincere support to this struggle our country has been putting up. With these thoughts in my mind, I once again remember with respect the Ottoman Armenians whom we lost during the First World War, share the grief of their relatives and offer my regards and affection to you all.

In a 2015 poll for the Foundation for the Memory of Shoah and Fondapol, 33% of people between the ages of 16 and 29 living in Turkey surveyed answered in the affirmative to the question: "In your view, can we talk about genocide in relation to the massacre of the Armenians, by the Turks, in 1915?".

In the twentieth century, the only Turkish political movement to recognize the genocide was the Maoist militant group Communist Party of Turkey/Marxist–Leninist (TKP/ML). The genocide has also been recognized by Kurdish political movements including the Kurdistan Workers' Party (PKK) in its official newspaper in 1982 and the Kurdish parliament-in-exile in 1997. As of 2020, genocide denial is supported by all major political parties in Turkey, except the Peoples' Democratic Party (HDP) and the Green Left Party, as well as many pro- and anti-government media and civil society organizations. Both government and opposition parties have strongly reacted to genocide recognition in other countries. The socialist Workers' Party of Turkey has expressed opposition against the actions, while not expressly calling it a genocide. On July 18, 2023, the European Parliament called on Turkey to recognize the Armenian genocide.

=== Kurdish position ===
Some Kurdish tribes played a role in the genocide, as they were utilized by the Ottoman authorities to carry out the mass killings. Among modern Kurds, including major Kurdish parties like the Peoples' Democratic Party (HDP), and the Kurdistan Democratic Party (KDP), most of them acknowledge the killings and apologize in the name of their ancestors who committed atrocities toward Armenians, Greeks, and Assyrians in the name of the Ottoman Empire.

According to a 2014 poll, 24.4% of Turkish citizens who vote for BDP (HDP), which is usually voted by Kurds, accept the Armenian genocide. Excluding those who didn't answer the question in the poll, 44% of BDP voters think that "Turkey should apologize for the Armenians that lost their lives in 1915" or that "Turkey should express its regret over the Armenians that lost their lives in 1915".

=== United States ===
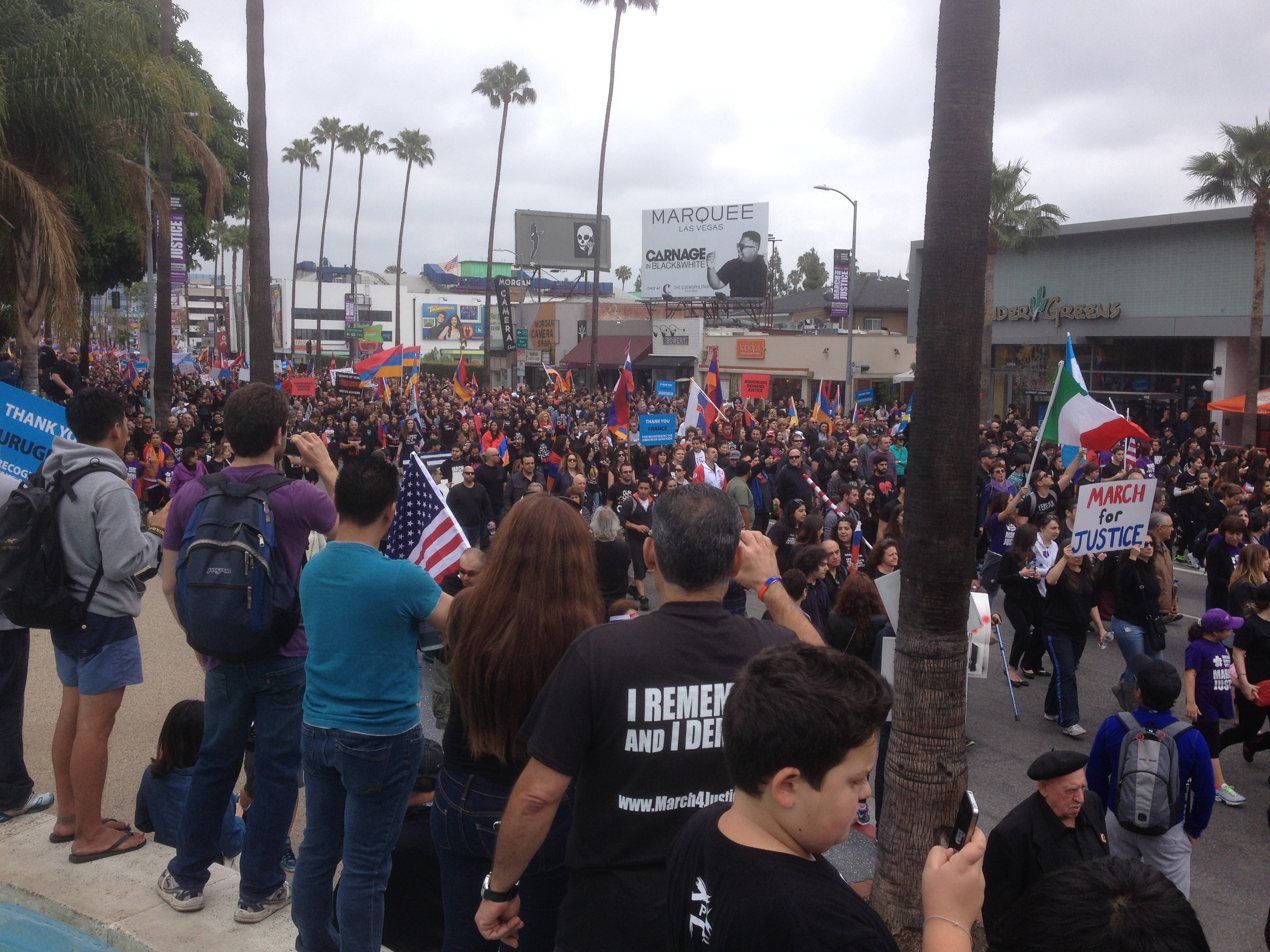
Armenian Genocide Remembrance Day in Los Angeles, California, 2015

In 1951, the United States Department of State exemplified the Armenian case as an act of genocide in recent past, in the written statement by United States to the International Court of Justice (ICJ): "The Genocide Convention resulted from the inhuman and barbarous practices which prevailed in certain countries prior to and during World War II, when entire religious, racial and national minority groups were threatened with and subjected to deliberate extermination. The practice of genocide has occurred throughout human history. The Roman persecution of the Christians, the Turkish massacres of Armenians, the extermination of millions of Jews and Poles by the Nazis are outstanding examples of the crime of genocide.

This was the background when the General Assembly of the United Nations considered the problem of genocide." That the US later changed this position and has since consistently refrained from officially using the term "genocide" about these events can be ascribed to the rise of the Cold War, Turkey's NATO membership and the disappearance of Raphael Lemkin as a strong human rights advocate from the US State Department.

Several official US documents describe the events as genocide. The United States House of Representatives adopted resolutions commemorating the Armenian genocide in 1975, 1984 and 1996. President Ronald Reagan also described the events as genocide in his speech on April 22, 1981. On March 4, 2010, the United States House Committee on Foreign Affairs recognized the massacres of 1915 as genocide. The legislatures of all 50 US states have made individual proclamations recognizing the events of 1915 to 1923 as genocide, with Alabama in 2019 and Mississippi in 2022 being the last.

House Joint Resolution 148, adopted on April 8, 1975, resolved:

Authorizes the President to designate April 24, 1975, as 'National Day of Remembrance of Man's Inhumanity to Man' for remembrance of all the victims of genocide, especially those of Armenian ancestry who succumbed to the genocide perpetrated in 1915.

After the tenure of Ronald Reagan, later United States Presidents, until Joe Biden, refused to name the events as such because of concerns over alienating Turkey.

The Armenian Assembly of America (AAA) and the Armenian National Committee of America (ANCA), advocacy organizations representing the views and values of the Armenian American community in the United States, have been urging Congress and the President of the United States to recognize the genocide by Ottoman Turkey in 1915. They have also asked for an increase of economic aid to Armenia.

The US House Committee on Foreign Affairs approved HR 106, a bill that categorized and condemned the Ottoman Empire for the Genocide, on October 10, 2007, by a 27–21 vote. However, some of the support for the bill from both Democrats and Republicans eroded after the White House warned against the possibility of Turkey restricting airspace as well as ground-route access for US military and humanitarian efforts in Iraq in response to the bill. In response to the House Foreign Affairs Committee's decision on the bill, Turkey ordered their ambassador to the United States to return to Turkey for "consultations". The Turkish lobby worked intensely to block the bill's passage.

On January 19, 2008, United States Senator Barack Obama stated that "the Armenian Genocide is not an allegation, a personal opinion, or a point of view, but rather a widely documented fact supported by an overwhelming body of historical evidence. The facts are undeniable." He promised to recognize the genocide if elected president. On April 24, 2009, he stated as president: "I have consistently stated my own view of what occurred in 1915, and my view of that history has not changed. My interest remains the achievement of a full, frank and just acknowledgment of the facts." On April 24 commemoration speeches, Obama referred only to the Armenian synonym Mets Eghern ("Mec Eġeṙn"). In 2010, 2012, 2013, 2014 2015, and 2016 he did not use the word 'genocide'. In April 2015, Obama sent a Presidential Delegation to Armenia to attend the Centennial Commemoration in Yerevan. Susan E. Rice, Obama's National Security Advisor, encouraged the Foreign Minister Mevlüt Çavuşoğlu of Turkey to take concrete steps to improve relations with Armenia and to facilitate an open and frank dialogue in Turkey about the atrocities of 1915.

On October 29, 2019, the United States House of Representatives passed a resolution on a 405–11 vote to recognize the Armenian genocide. The United States Senate passed the resolution through unanimous vote on December 12, 2019, defying President Donald Trump, who opposed recognition. On April 24, 2020, President Trump issued a statement on Armenian Genocide Remembrance Day, referring to the events as "one of the worst mass atrocities of the 20th century".

On April 24, 2021, on Armenian Genocide Remembrance Day, President Joe Biden referred to the events as "genocide" in a statement released by the White House, in which the President formally equated the genocide perpetrated against Armenians with atrocities on the scale of those committed in Nazi-occupied Europe.

On April 24, 2025, during the first Armenian Genocide Remembrance Day of Trump's second term, the White House did not use the term "genocide" in a statement commemorating the day. The Armenian Weekly referred to Trump's statement as "a shameful reversal of decades of U.S. acknowledgements". Aram Hamparian, the executive director of the Armenian National Committee of America, also condemned the statement, writing "Trump's omission is not a diplomatic oversight – but rather a deliberate retreat from truth and a dangerous signal of U.S. tolerance for ongoing anti-Armenian violence." The second Trump administration continues to avoid using the term "genocide," instead continuing to refer to the events as the Medz Yeghern (Armenian for 'Great Catastrophe') and labeling April 24 as only "Armenian Remembrance Day."

=== France ===
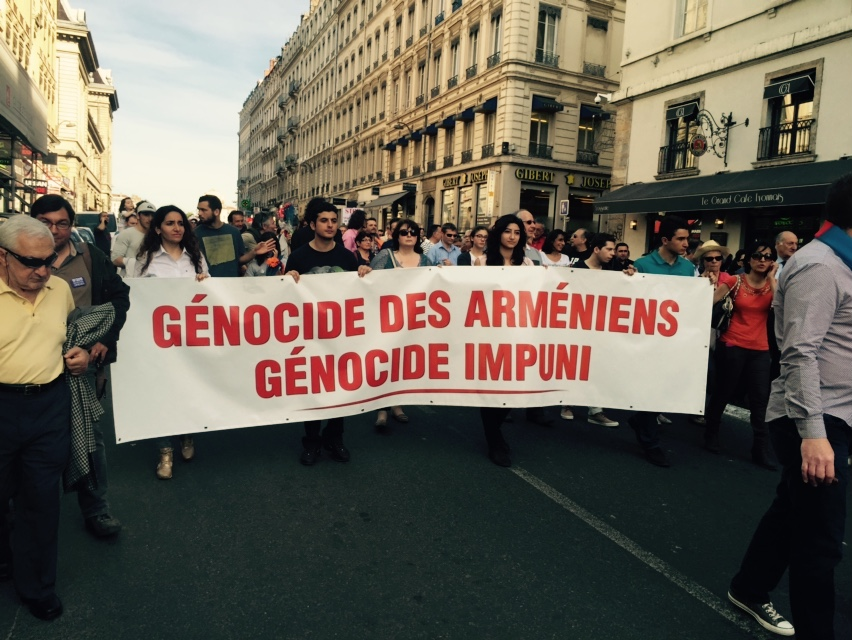
Armenian Genocide Remembrance Day in Lyon, 2015

France has formally recognized the Armenian massacres as genocide.

In 2006, the French Parliament submitted a bill to create a law that would punish any person denying the Armenian genocide with up to five years' imprisonment and a fine. Despite Turkish protests, the French National Assembly adopted a bill making it a crime to deny that Armenians suffered genocide in 1915 at the hands of the Ottoman Turks. The bill had been criticized as an attempt to garner votes from among the 600,000 ethnic Armenians of France. This criticism has come not only from within Turkey, but also from Orhan Pamuk. However, the bill was dropped in the summer of 2011 before going to the Senate.

Since then, France has urged Turkey to recognize the 1915 massacre as genocide.

The French Senate passed a bill in 2011 that criminalizes denial of acknowledged genocides, which includes both the Holocaust and the Armenian genocide. The bill was submitted by the parliament in 2012. However, the bill was considered unconstitutional on February 28, 2012, by the French Constitutional Court: "The council rules that by punishing anyone contesting the existence of... crimes that lawmakers themselves recognized or qualified as such, lawmakers committed an unconstitutional attack on freedom of expression".

The French Senate adopted a new bill on October 14, 2016, that made the denial of the Armenian genocide a crime. The bill was introduced by the French Government and passed by the French National Assembly in July 2016, and stipulates a penalty of a year in prison or a 45,000 € fine. However, the law was put down by the French Constitutional Court in January 2017. The Council said the "ruling causes uncertainty regarding expressions and comments on historical matters. Thereby, this ruling is an unnecessary and disproportionate attack against freedom of speech."

On February 5, 2019, French President Emmanuel Macron declared April 24 as Armenian genocide commemoration day in France.

=== Iran ===
Due to the period of weak central government and Tehran's inability to protect its territorial integrity when the genocide occurred, Muslim Turks and Kurdish tribes invaded the town of Salmas in northwestern Persia, massacring the Christian Armenian inhabitants after the withdrawal of Russian troops from the region. Prior to the Russian withdrawal, a large number of Christians fled across the Aras river into Russia, while a small number remained hidden in the homes of local Muslims.

Mohammad-Ali Jamalzadeh, a prominent Persian writer in the 20th century, studied in Europe where he joined a group of Iranian nationalists in Berlin who were to eventually start a newspaper (Rastakhiz) in Baghdad in 1915. During a trip from Baghdad to Istanbul he witnessed the deportations of Armenians and encountered many Armenian victims and corpses during his journey. He wrote of his experiences and eyewitness accounts decades later in two books entitled "Qatl-e Amm-e Armanian" (Persian: قتل عام ارمنیان, literally; Armenian massacres) and "Qatl o ḡārat-e Arāmaneh dar Torkiye" (On the massacres of Armenians in Turkey).

The current government of Iran has not officially acknowledged the Armenian genocide, partially due to geopolitical considerations around relations with Turkey. However Armenia–Iran relations have been largely cordial and Iran is one of Armenia's major trade partners, as Turkey and Azerbaijan have blockaded the country. Some Iranian politicians, such as the reformist president Mohammad Khatami, who visited the Armenian genocide memorial in 2004, have paid respect to the victims of the Armenian genocide in the past. When principlist president Mahmoud Ahmadinejad visited Armenia in 2007, he did not visit the memorial. When asked about it by a student at Yerevan university, he stated "Tehran's position on historical events is very clear, and we condemn all injustices throughout human history." A few current and former members of the Iranian parliament have also made statements indicating recognition of the genocide, including Ali Akbar Mohtashamipour, Hadi Khamenei, and Ruhollah Hosseinian, among others.

In 2010, Turkey and Iran entered a political dispute after Iranian Vice President Hamid Baghaei allegedly condemned Turkey for the Armenian genocide, while making a comparison related to the WWII-era Invasion of Iran. The tensions were resolved after the Iranian government issued a statement that his comments were taken out of context, and that Baghaei had only made a reference to the issue, without taking any position on the subject. The Iranian Ministry of Cultural Heritage, Handicrafts and Tourism also promptly issued a statement, saying Iran's official position on the Armenian genocide is identical to that of Turkey, which was followed by the Iranian embassy in Ankara stating the same. In 2015, the Iranian Armenian community called on Hassan Rouhani to officially recognize the Armenian genocide, in order to prevent repeat occurrences of such events in the future.

=== United Kingdom ===
The devolved legislatures of Scotland and Wales have formally recognized the Armenian genocide. The government of the United Kingdom does not recognize the Armenian genocide, as it considers that the evidence is not clear enough to retrospectively consider "the terrible events that afflicted the Ottoman Armenian population at the beginning of the last century" to be genocide under the 1948 UN convention. The British government states the "massacres were an appalling tragedy" and condemns them, stating that this was the view of the government during that period. In 2006, an early day motion recognizing the Armenian genocide by the UK Parliament was signed by 182 MPs.

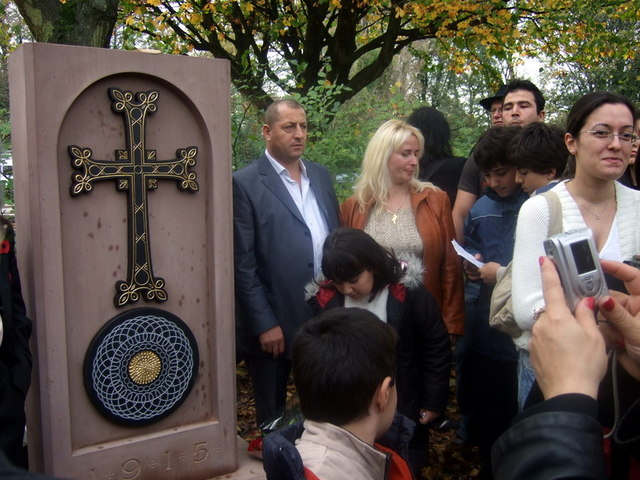
Armenian memorial unveiled in Cardiff in 2007

However, in 2007, the position of the British government was that it condemns the massacres, but "neither this Government nor previous British Governments have judged that the evidence is sufficiently unequivocal to persuade us that these events should be categorised as genocide as defined by the 1948 UN Convention on Genocide, a convention which is, in any event, not retrospective in application."

In 2009, the lawyer Geoffrey Robertson QC revealed in a disclosure of Foreign Office documents entitled "Was there an Armenian Genocide?", how the British Parliament has routinely been misinformed and misled by ministers who have recited FCO briefs without questioning their accuracy. As summarized by Robertson, "there was no 'evidence' that had ever been looked at and there had never been a 'judgment' at all."

A 1999 Foreign Office briefing for ministers said that the recognition of the Armenian genocide would provide no practical benefit to the UK and goes on to say that "The current line is the only feasible option" owing to "the importance of our relations (political, strategic and commercial) with Turkey". The Foreign Office documents furthermore include advice from 1995 to the then Conservative foreign minister, Douglas Hogg, that he should refuse to attend a memorial service for the victims of the genocide. As of 2015, the United Kingdom does not formally recognize the Ottoman Empire's massacres of Armenians as a "genocide".

James Bryce (1838–1922), 1st Viscount Bryce, was one of the first Britons to bring this issue to public attention.

=== Germany ===
Germany was an ally of the Ottoman Empire in World War I, and many German military officers were complicit in letting the genocide happen, and were also supporting the Ottoman Empire in fear that Armenians would collaborate with Russia at the time; several German figures like Hans Humann and Hans von Seeckt also demonstrated support for the Ottomans. These actions were the seeds for the future Holocaust by Nazi Germany as many were inspired by the gruesome Armenian genocide.

British journalist Robert Fisk, while acknowledging the role playing by most German diplomats and parliamentaries in the condemnation of the Ottoman Turks, noted that some of the German witnesses to the Armenian genocide would later go on to play a role in the Nazi regime. For example, Konstantin Freiherr von Neurath, who was attached to the Turkish 4th Army in 1915 with instructions to monitor "operations" against the Armenians, later became Adolf Hitler's foreign minister and "Protector of Bohemia and Moravia" during Reinhard Heydrich's terror in Czechoslovakia.

Despite this, many other German officers had also openly disapproved the genocide and were appalled to see it happen. Count Paul Wolff Metternich was an eyewitness who received numerous messages about the brutal Armenian genocide and deportation, and the Ottomans' determination to exterminate Armenians; his successor Hans Freiherr von Wangenheim also experienced similar story and documented the genocide. Max Erwin von Scheubner-Richter, who documented various massacres of Armenians, had sent fifteen reports regarding "deportations and mass killings" to the German chancellery and detailed methods by the Ottoman government to commit atrocities and cover-up attempts by the Ottomans.

German writer Armin T. Wegner had defied state censorship by taking photographs about the Armenian genocide. He later stated: "I venture to claim the right of setting before you these pictures of misery and terror which passed before my eyes during nearly two years, and which will never be obliterated from my mind.". He was eventually arrested by the Germans and recalled to Germany, but his work and open defiance toward the Ottoman censorship had made him a venerated name in Armenia for championing the cause in difficult times.

Germany, in 2005, had decided to acknowledge the Armenian genocide for the first time. The solution was later extended in 2016, causing tensions between Germany and Turkey to rise.

=== Austria ===
Austria-Hungary was an ally of the Ottoman Empire and ignored numerous requests for help from the Armenian Catholicos in 1915. Reports about the genocide were suppressed by Markgraf Johann von Pallavicini (Austrian ambassador in Istanbul). Austrian newspapers kept silent about the genocide and adopted anti-Armenian stereotypes in their coverage of the defense of Van. The writer Franz Werfel, in his book The Forty Days of Musa Dagh, published in 1933, describes the beginning of the genocide from the perspective of the Armenians; it was later banned by the Nazis. In 2015, the Austrian Parliament recognized and condemned the genocide of Armenian citizens. The Austrian government then called upon the government of Turkey to recognize the events of 1915–1916 as genocide. Turkey responded that they were 'disappointed' and implied Austria was presenting only the Armenian version of events.

=== China ===
Skepticism towards Turkey from China has resulted in a greater call for solidarity to the Armenian people in China, since relations between modern China and Armenia are friendly. During the Armenian genocide, China hosted a small number of Armenian refugees, mostly concentrated around Harbin and Tianjin, prompting expressions of gratitude from the survivors. Calls for recognition of the genocide in China also gather attention, notably in 2009 when the Turkish government blamed Chinese administration for the Uyghur–Han tensions, and in 2014 when a group of Armenian musicians authorized by Beijing performed classical Armenian musical pieces in commemoration of the centenary of the genocide in China.

In 2011, erstwhile Chinese Foreign Minister Yang Jiechi laid flowers on the Armenian genocide memorial in Yerevan.

=== Australia ===
Australia does not view the events at the end of the Ottoman Empire as a genocide, although it does not deny it happened. Australia is one of the countries who were at war with the Ottoman Empire at the time of the events, notably during the Gallipoli Campaign. Australia does acknowledge the tragic events had devastating effects on the identity, heritage, and culture of all the people in the areas that the events have occurred. Furthermore, in response to the motions of New South Wales and South Australia to recognize the events as genocide, the Foreign Minister of Australia has clarified on June 4, 2014 that Australian states and territories have no constitutional role in the formulation of the Australian foreign policy, and that Australia does not view the tragic events at the end of the Ottoman Empire as a genocide.

=== Israel ===
Until 2026, Israel neither recognized nor denied the Armenian genocide, a policy historically stemming from a few geopolitical considerations. According to The Times of Israel, "Israel is a small country in a hostile neighborhood that can't afford to antagonize the few friends it has in the region. Even more powerful states refuse to employ the 'genocide' term for fear of alienating Turkey...." Israel also shares what has been referred to as a "budding friendship" with Azerbaijan, a "Shiite Muslim but moderate country bordering Iran" that also strongly opposes recognition. According to former Israeli minister Yossi Sarid, one of the country's most vocal supporters of recognition, Israel tends to follow policies set by the United States, which had not recognized it.

Despite these concerns, many prominent Israeli figures from across the political spectrum called for recognition. In 2003, the Catholicos of All Armenians Karekin II visited the then Ashkenazi Chief Rabbi of Israel Yona Metzger who accepted an invitation to visit Armenia by Karekin II, a trip that he made in 2005, including a visit to the Tsitsernakaberd (the Genocide Memorial in Yerevan). While doing so he formally recognized the Armenian genocide as a historical fact. A 2007 survey found that more than 70% of Israelis thought that Israel should recognize the genocide, with 44% willing to break off relations with Turkey over the issue.

Israel appeared to move closer to officially recognizing the genocide in 2011 when the Knesset held its first open discussion on the matter. By a unanimous vote of 20–0, the Knesset approved referring the subject to the Education Committee for more extensive deliberation. Israel's speaker of the Knesset told an Israel-based Armenian action committee that he intended to introduce an annual parliamentary session to mark the genocide. A special parliamentary session held in 2012 to determine if Israel would recognize the Armenian genocide ended inconclusively. Then-Knesset speaker Reuven Rivlin and Cabinet Minister Gilad Erdan were among those supporting formal recognition by the government. The recognition was not approved at that time and in 2015, Rafael Harpaz, Israel's ambassador to Azerbaijan, said in an interview that Foreign Minister Avigdor Lieberman has made it clear that Israel would not recognize the Armenian genocide, given Israel's hopes that its political and economic relationship with Turkey and later Azerbaijan could improve.

MKs who support recognition have acknowledged the negative effect which it could have on Israel–Azerbaijan and Israel–Turkey relations. As then Knesset Spokesperson Rivlin said, "Turkey is and will be an ally of Israel. The talks with Turkey are understandable and even necessary from a strategic and diplomatic perspective. But those circumstances cannot justify the Knesset ignoring the tragedy of another people" and Ayelet Shaked (of the religious-nationalist Jewish Home party) said: "We must confront our silence and that of the world in the face of such horrors." Following the recognition of the genocide in 2026, the Foreign ministry of Azerbaijan called the recognition a "distortion of the historical facts".

In 2000, then-education minister Yossi Sarid, chairman of the Meretz party, announced plans to place the Armenian genocide on Israel's history curricula. As a result of Sarid's 2000 speech to an Armenian church in Jerusalem recognizing their genocide, he became persona non grata in Turkey. Meretz has long fought for recognition of the genocide. Zehava Galon, a successor of Sarid as Meretz leader, has initiated several motions in the Knesset calling for the government to recognize the Armenian genocide. In 2013 she said, "Reconciliation with Turkey is an important and strategic move, but it should not affect the recognition." Her 2014 motion also enjoyed much support on the Knesset floor, including that of Knesset Speaker Yuli Edelstein. Galon has also paid her respects at local Armenian memorial services.

Rivlin, as president of Israel, was one of the Knesset's most outspoken proponents of recognition. It was reported in 2014 that due to the sensitivities of Israel's relationship with Turkey, Rivlin was quietly distancing himself from the Israeli campaign to recognize the Armenian genocide and chose not to sign the annual petition, which he had previously done. Still, Israel has taken greater steps toward Armenian genocide recognition under Rivlin's presidency. Rivlin was the first Israeli president to speak at the United Nations on the issue. During the United Nations Holocaust Memorial on January 28, 2015, President Rivlin spoke about the Armenian tragedy. It was observed that in his speech he used the phrase רצח בני העם הארמני reẓaḥ bnei haʿam haArmeni, which means "the murder of the members of the Armenian nation," coming close to the Hebrew term for genocide, רצח עם reẓaḥ ʿam. In addition, 2015 marked the first time that Israel sent a delegation—Nachman Shai (Zionist Union) and Anat Berko (Likud)—to Yerevan for the official memorial event.

In an event billed as the first to be held by an Israeli president to commemorate the tragedy, Rivlin also invited Armenian communal and religious leader's to his official residence on April 26, 2015. He said we are "morally obligated to point out the facts, as horrible as they might be, we must not ignore them." As he skirted using the term "genocide," some Armenian leaders were disappointed, though still thankful for the event. However, it was later reported that earlier that same month, while briefing foreign journalists in English, Rivlin had in fact referred to the killings as genocide, saying:

It was Avshalom Feinberg, one of my eldest brothers, who said 25 years before the Holocaust that if we do not warn against what is going on with the Armenians, what will happen afterwards when they try to do to us...? There is a saying that the Nazis used the Armenian genocide as something that gave them permission to bring the Holocaust into reality, according to their belief that they have to discriminate against the Jewish people. 'Never again' belongs to every one of you, all the nations. We cannot allow something like that to happen."

In 2015, a group of distinguished Israeli academics, artists, and former generals and politicians signed a petition calling on Israel to follow the Pope's lead and recognize the genocide. The signatories included author Amos Oz, historian Yehuda Bauer, Major General (ret.) Amos Yadlin, former Likud minister Dan Meridor and about a dozen former MKs and ministers.

Rivlin visited the Armenian Patriarchate of Jerusalem on May 9, 2016. Concluding his speech he said, that "the Armenians were massacred in 1915. My parents remember thousands of Armenian migrants finding asylum at the Armenian Church. No one in Israel denies that an entire nation was massacred."

On August 1, 2016, the Knesset Committee on Education, Culture and Sports recognized the Armenian genocide. In response to rising tensions between Turkey and Israel since the 2010s, the Israeli lobbies had refused to assist Turkey and Azerbaijan over the Armenian genocide dispute, which was partially responsible for the recognition of Armenian genocide by the U.S. Congress.

In 2024, as tensions with Turkey escalated due to the Gaza war, senior Israeli officials such as Prime Minister Benjamin Netanyahu and Foreign Minister Israel Katz mentioned the Armenian genocide in public statements criticizing Turkey. In August 2025, Prime Minister Netanyahu said that he personally recognizes the Armenian genocide during an interview with conservative American businessman and podcaster Patrick Bet-David. Haaretz noted that his statement does not constitute formal Israeli recognition.

On June 28, 2026, the Israeli cabinet voted to formally recognize the genocide, following a resolution proposed by Foreign Minister Gideon Sa'ar, who called it a "moral and historical duty" and declared it is "never too late to do the right thing". The bill is still yet to be ratified by the Knesset.

=== Russia ===
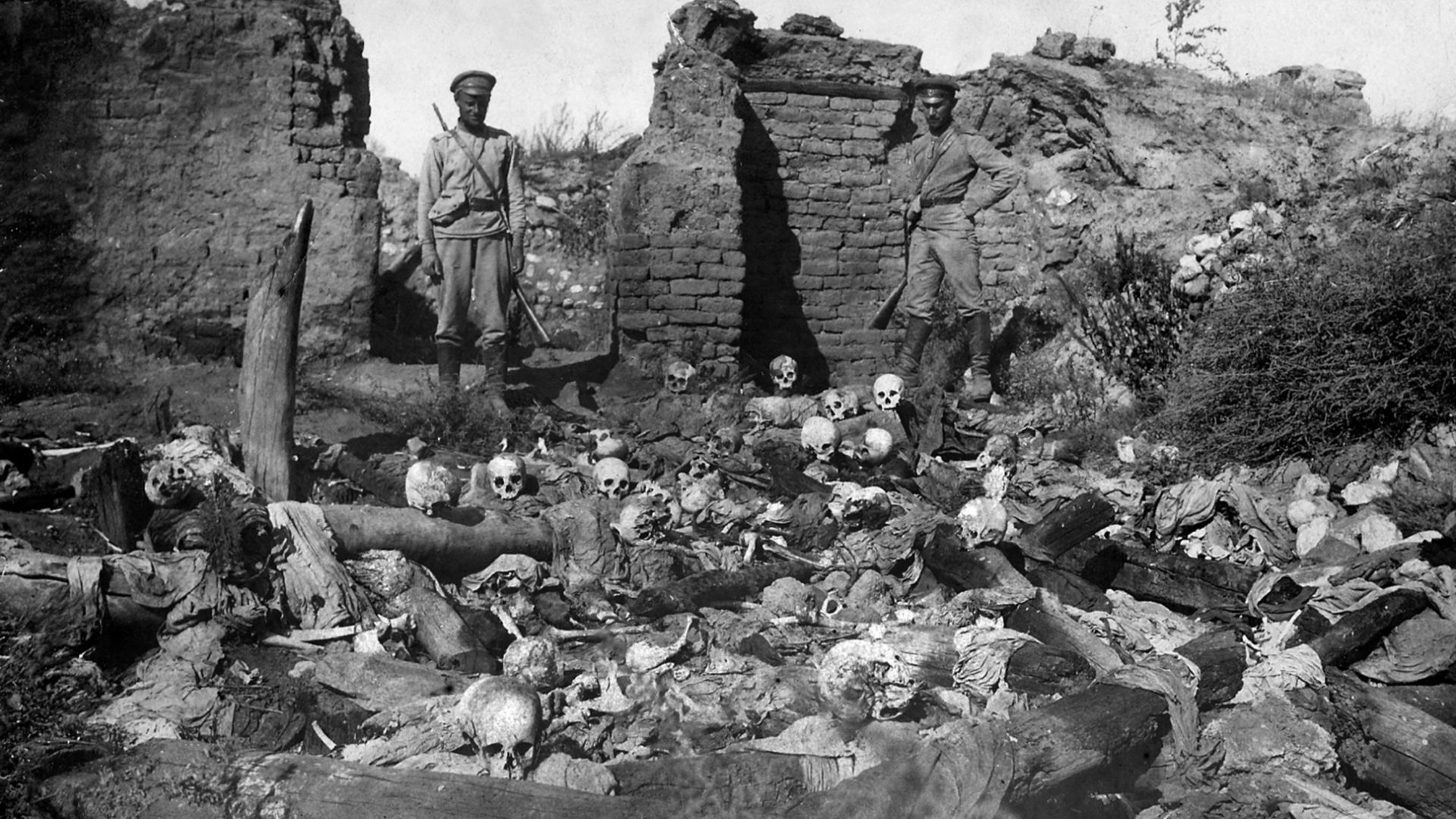
Russian soldiers pictured in the Armenian village of Sheykhalan, 1915

The Russian Empire had fought in World War I as part of the Entente and thus it had conflicted with the Ottoman Empire. As such, Russian position toward the Armenian genocide was stemmed from the historical experience, where Russian troops frequently encountered deserted and destroyed villages, remains of Armenians, and mass atrocities committed against Armenian civilians by the Ottoman troops, which was reported by Mikhail Papadyanov, Russian State Duma representative in Baku. Russia was obliged to assist the Armenian civilians fleeing from genocide, and Russia had established humanitarian relief groups to deliver needed aids and supports for ethnic Armenians. In 1916, shocking scenes obtained from Erzurum led the Russians to retaliate against the Ottoman III Army whom they held responsible for the massacres, destroying it in its entirety.

As for the result of this historical confrontation with the Ottomans, current poor relations between Russia and Turkey with regard to conflict in Syria, and its strong relations with the Armenians from 19th century onward, with Russia acting as a protector to the Christians including Armenians, Russia had acknowledged the Armenian genocide in 1995. In 2016, then-Prime Minister of Russia, Dmitry Medvedev, laid flowers in remembrance to the victims of Armenian genocide.

=== Japan ===
Japan was part of the Entente during World War I, but was not involved in the European front of the conflict as Japanese activities concentrated around China and other Asian territories. However, during the genocide, the Japanese had first reported about it and thus participated in the relief efforts to save the Armenian population. The effort was done by Viscount Shibusawa Eiichi, who was alarmed by the ongoing massacre of the Armenian population. However, as a result of its eventual role in World War II, Japanese war crimes had been widely compared to the Ottoman war crimes; thus Japan has been reluctant to acknowledge the genocide due to fear of political backlash.

=== Finland and Sweden ===
Finland has not recognized the Armenian genocide while Sweden recognized the genocide in 2010. However, in August 2022 the Left Youth Organization in Finland urged the government to recognize the Armenian genocide. In June 2021, Finnish parliamentarian Päivi Räsänen called on the government to recognize the Armenian genocide. In September 2005, former Finnish president Tarja Halonen visited Tsitsernakaberd. In February 2016, Swedish foreign minister Margot Wallström visited Tsitsernakaberd.

=== Poland ===
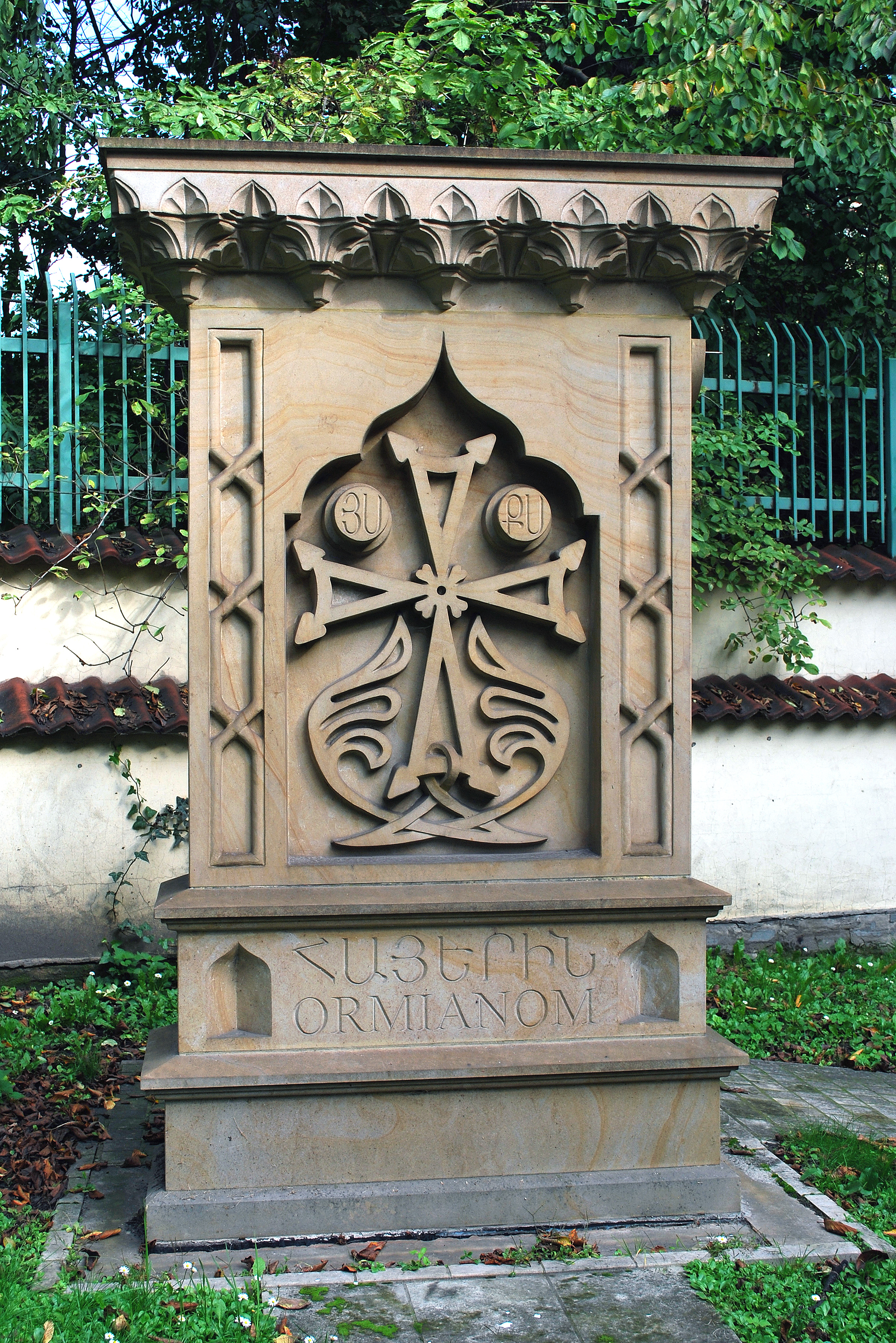
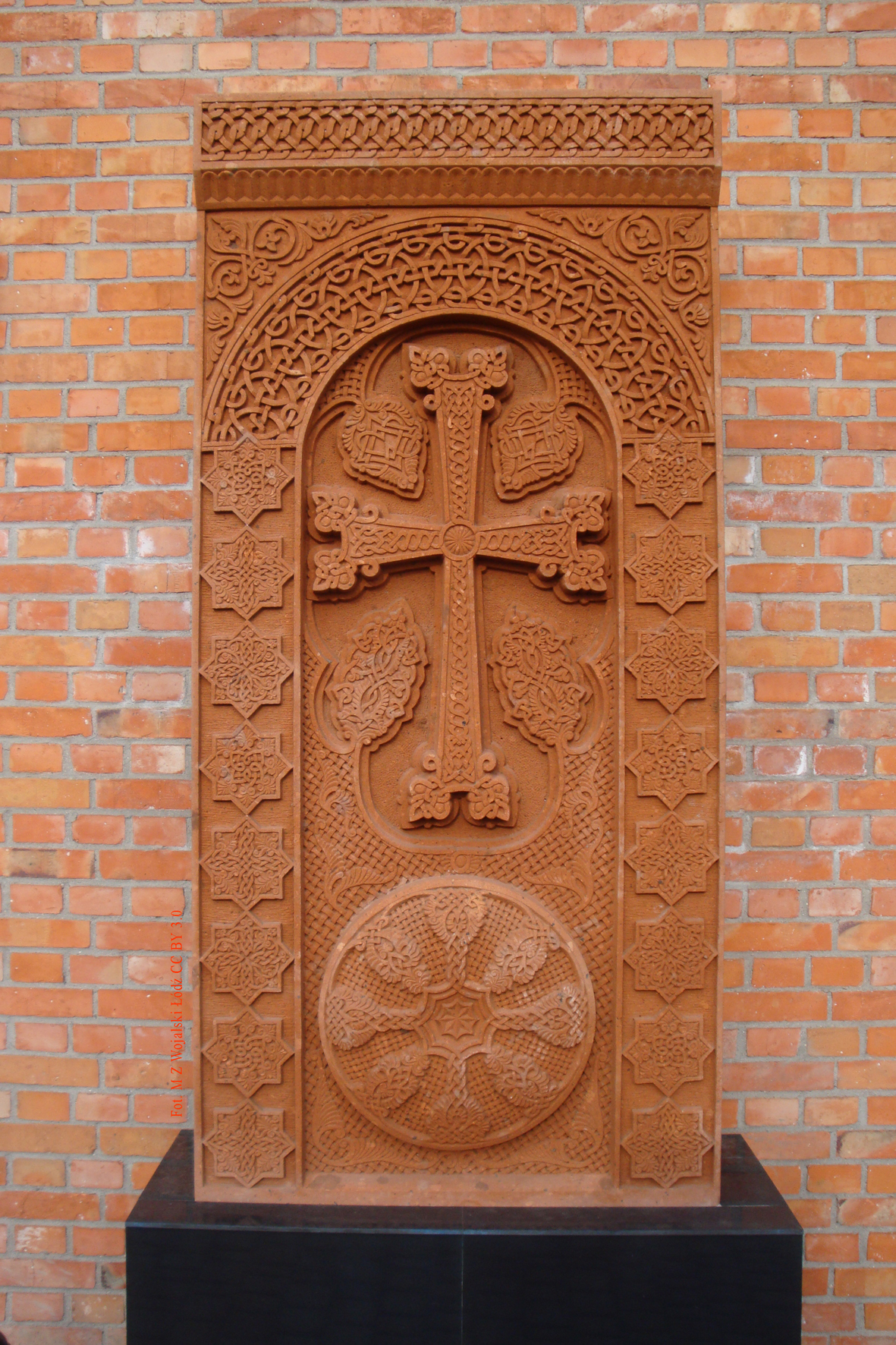
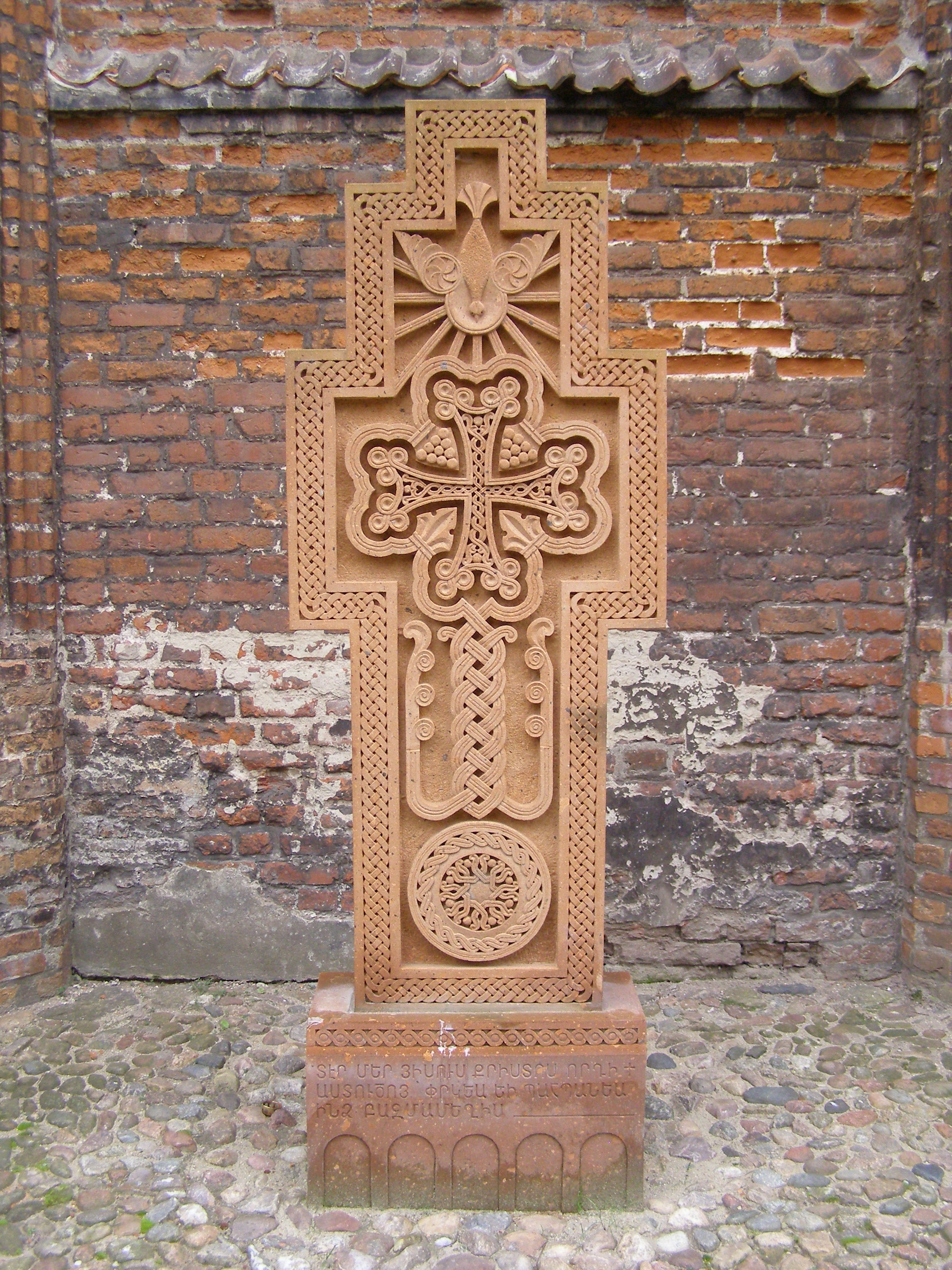
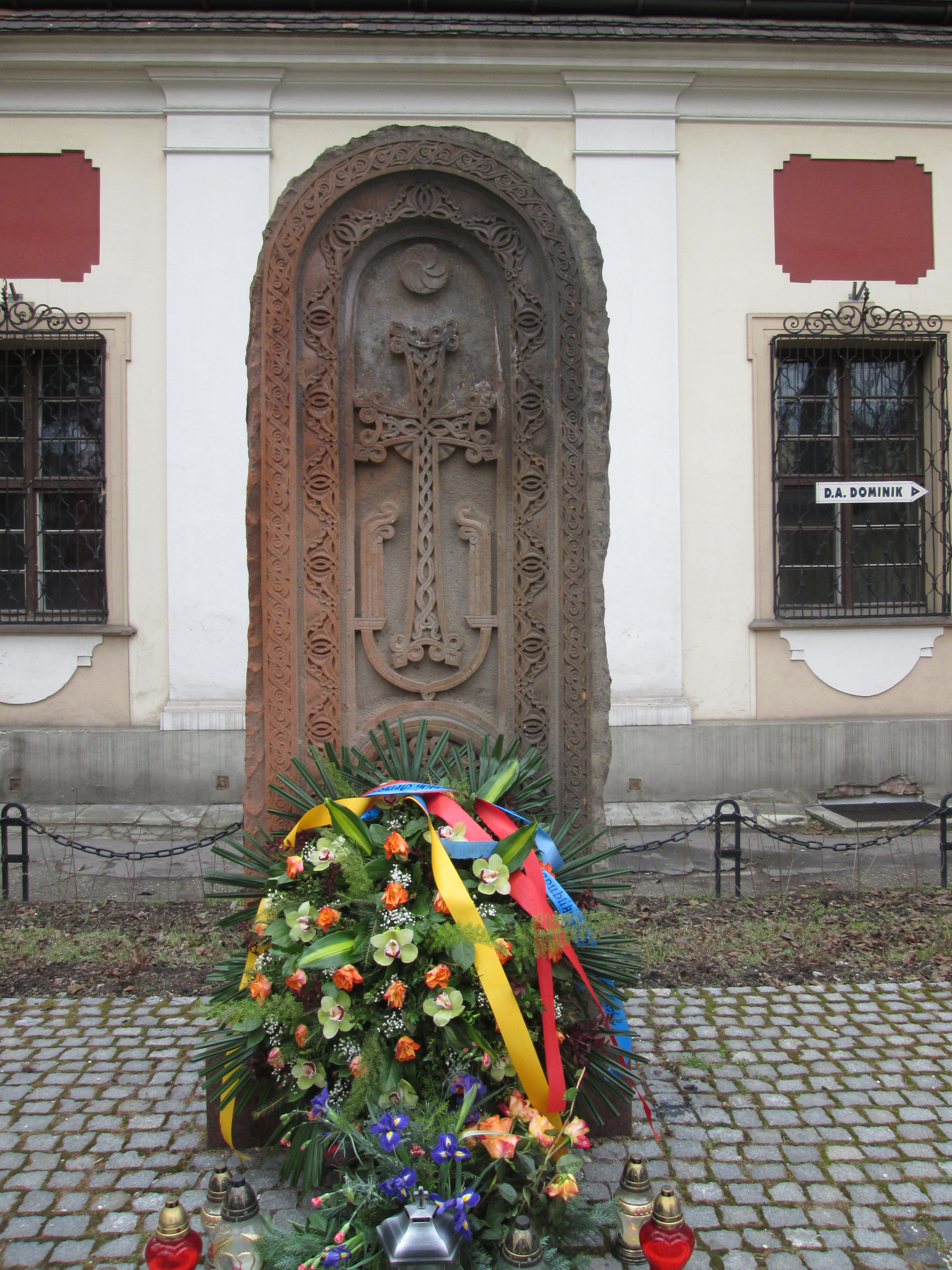
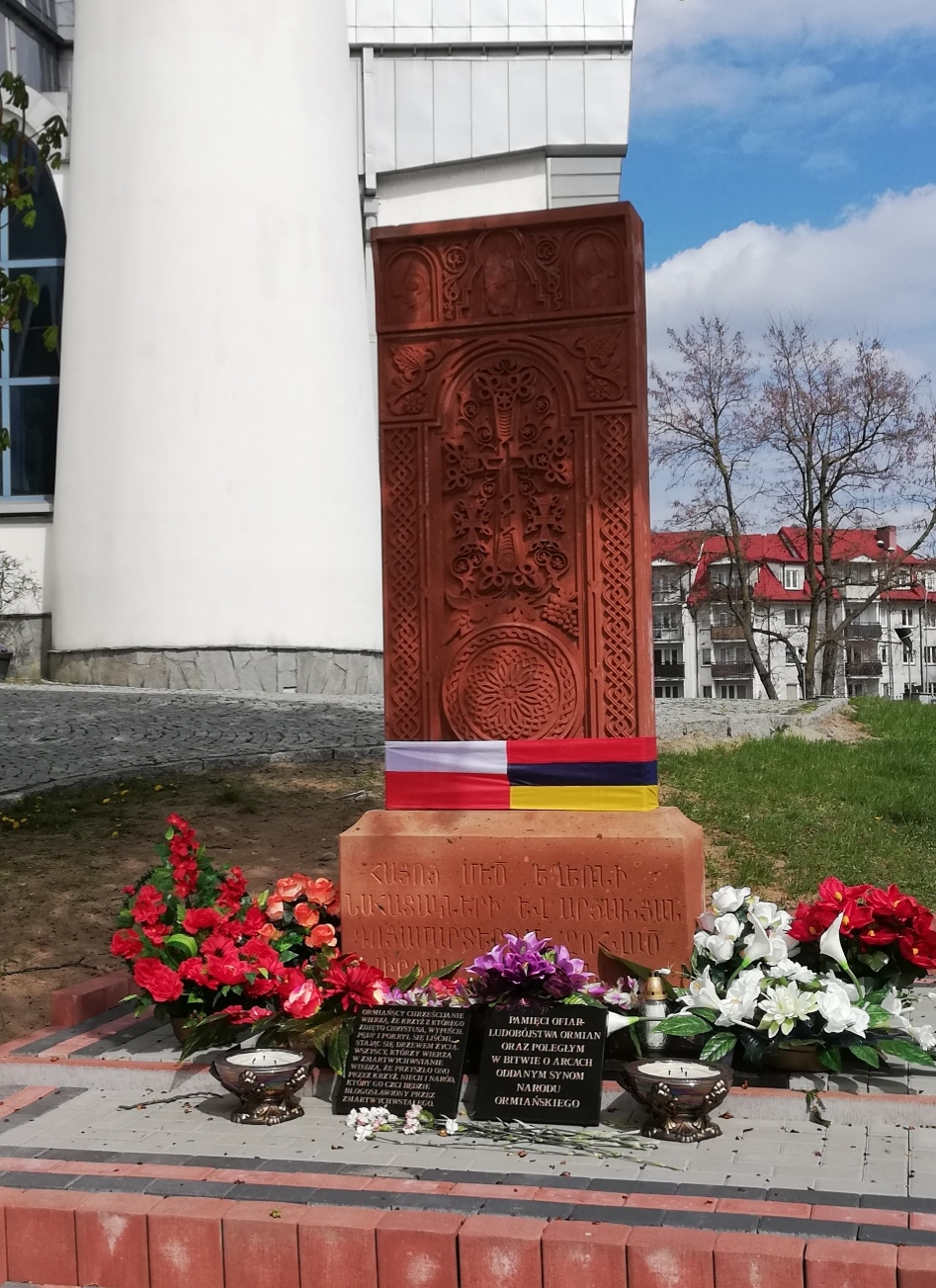
Khachkars commemorating the genocide victims in Kraków, Łódź, Gdańsk, Wrocław and Białystok

Poland has historically strong relationships with both Armenia and Turkey. Historic Polish-Armenian contacts date back several centuries, with Poland being the home of a historically important Armenian diaspora dating back to the Late Middle Ages, which in 2017 was commemorated by the Senate of Poland, which expressed gratitude for its contribution to Polish culture and history. The predecessor of modern Turkey, the Ottoman Empire, had rejected the Partitions of Poland, and many Poles had supported the Ottomans against Russia on their quest to regain independence from Russia, Austria and Germany. Since the 19th century, both Armenia and Turkey were home to Polish refugees and exiles from partitioned Poland (see Polonezköy and Poles in Armenia).

Poland, a member of the European Union, supports Turkey to integrate further within the EU, and supports Armenia's efforts for closer cooperation with the EU.

Despite this strong Polish–Turkish relationship however, Poland officially recognized the Armenian genocide in 2005. Prominent Polish politicians such as Lech Wałęsa had urged Turkey to acknowledge the genocide, where he made his speech in Echimadzin about the genocide, calling it "the first genocide of the 20th century", although the claim is incorrect as the Herero and Nama genocide of 1904–1908, also recognized by Poland, predates it.

There are several khachkars in Poland, commemorating the Armenian genocide, e.g. in Kraków, Wrocław, Łódź, Gdańsk, Białystok, Gliwice and Elbląg. In Warsaw, there is also a memorial to Hasan Mazhar, Turkish governor of Ankara who refused to participate in the Armenian genocide.

=== Romania and Moldova ===
Regarding Romania, in 2006, the President Traian Băsescu was asked if Romania would follow France and other Western states in recognizing the genocide. He then declared "we will not do anything affecting our neutrality in our relations with all the countries of the Black Sea region" and said Romania did not want to risk worsening relations with Turkey. Băsescu said Armenia was complicating Turkey's integration into the European Union by continuously raising the issue in the international community. However, over the next several years, pressure for Romania to recognize the event grew. In 2016, Cătălin Avramescu, advisor to the then ex-president Băsescu, said "Romania has special duty to recognize Armenian Genocide"; while the Romanian-Armenian politician Varujan Vosganian, who is president of the Union of Armenians of Romania, called on the Romanian Parliament in 2019 to do the same. In one poll, it was found that 72% of the Romanians surveyed were aware of the Armenian genocide.

On the other hand, Moldova has expressed greater tolerance for the possibility, which has even been considered in the Moldovan Parliament, although this is unlikely due to the good relations between Moldova and Turkey and the desire not to deteriorate them.

=== Saudi Arabia ===
Historically, Saudi Arabia had backed Turkey over the Armenian genocide and was one of the few countries in the world to not acknowledge the independence of Armenia; Saudi Arabia also sided with Azerbaijan, the main ally of Turkey, over the Nagorno-Karabakh conflict. However, increasing tensions between Saudi Arabia and Turkey have resulted in Saudi Arabia slowly paying attention to the Armenian genocide, with government-run newspapers starting to mention the Armenian genocide, and anti-Turkish boycotts on the rise in the Saudi Kingdom as well.

In April 2019, Saudi Arabia supported an American Congressional resolution to recognize the Armenian genocide. The Saudi Arabian ambassador in Lebanon had also paid a visit to the Armenian Genocide Memorial to demonstrate Saudi solidarity to Armenia. During the 2020 Nagorno-Karabakh conflict, Saudi Arabia had called for a boycott of Turkish goods after Turkish president Erdoğan blamed Saudi Arabia for the tensions in the Caucasus and the Middle East.

On the other hand, however, Saudi Arabia also needs to have leverage on relations with Azerbaijan, as Saudi Arabia has seen Azerbaijan as a potential place to destabilize Iran, an ally of Armenia but also Turkey and Saudi Arabia's adversary, thus Saudi Arabia takes its action carefully, although Saudi opposition to Turkey has soared.

=== India ===
India has neither officially recognized nor denied the Armenian genocide. However, during World War I, the country found itself at war against the Ottoman Empire, the predecessor of Turkey. Many Armenians sought refuge in India, most notably in Kolkata. With the relations between India and Turkey (and effectively Azerbaijan) worsened since the 2010s, mainly due to Turkey's (and effectively, Azerbaijan's) open support for Pakistan (especially regarding the Kashmir conflict), which also shares similar stance (on the genocide) with Turkey and Azerbaijan, there has been growing call for recognition of the genocide in India. For the first time, under the Premiership of Narendra Modi, the Indian embassy in Armenia has mentioned the genocide and Indian ambassador Kishan Dan Dewal also paid respect to the victims of the genocide in 2021.

=== Other countries ===
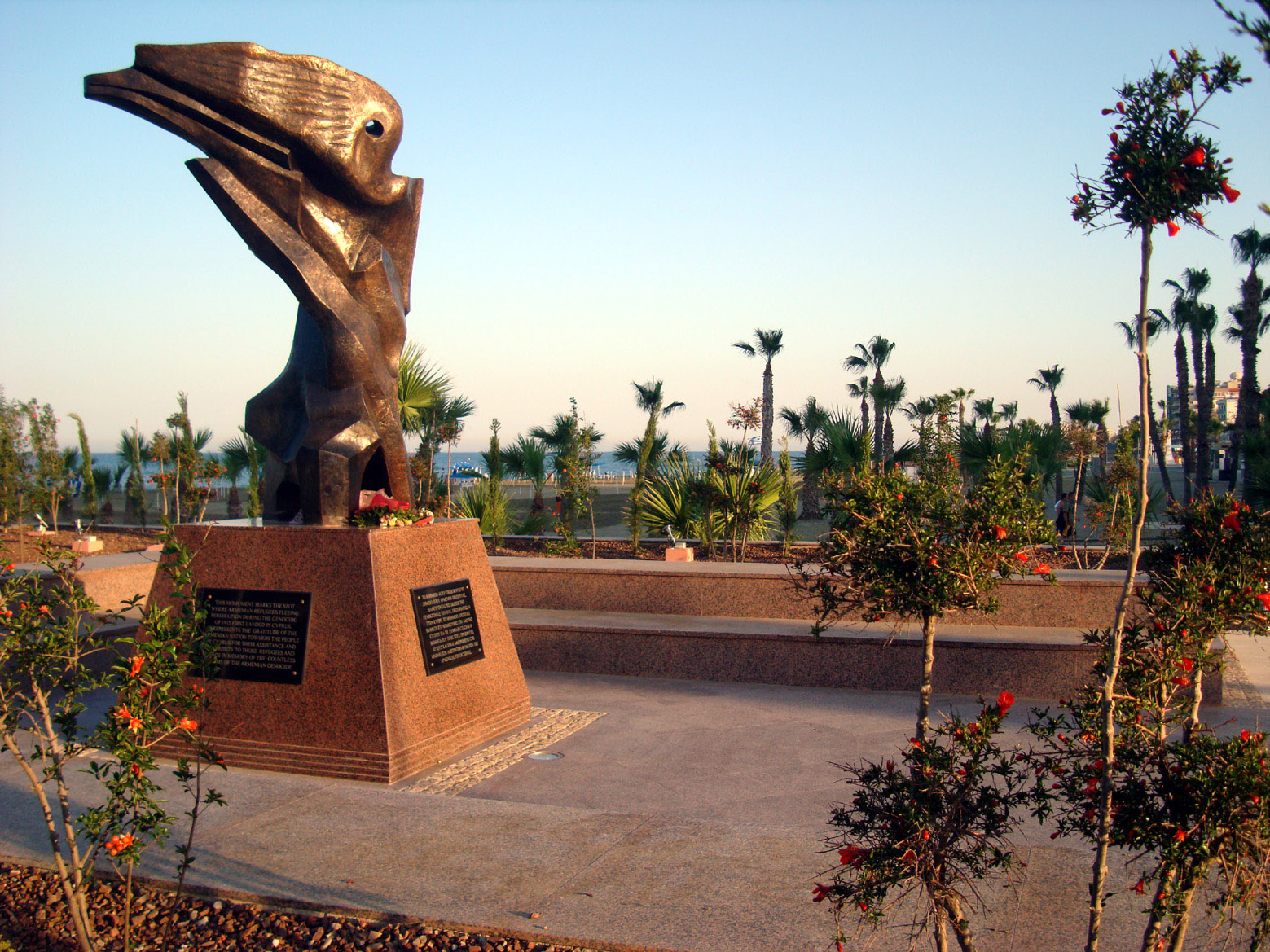
Armenian genocide monument in Larnaca, Cyprus. Cyprus was among the first countries to recognize the genocide.

Azerbaijan, which is in a strategic alliance with Turkey and is in conflict with Armenia because of the Nagorno-Karabakh conflict, shares the position of Turkey. During the Communist rule, when Azerbaijan was a part of the USSR, a brief description of the Armenian genocide was placed in the Azerbaijani Soviet Encyclopedia. Azerbaijan has actively lobbied against genocide recognition in other countries.

Pakistan also supports the position of Turkey regarding the Armenian Genocide, with the Foreign Ministry calling U.S. recognition "one-sided and political".

Denmark believes (2008) that the genocide recognition should be discussed by historians, not politicians. However, on January 26, 2017, the Danish Parliament adopted a resolution regarding the Armenian genocide, which recognizes the "tragic and bloody events that took place in eastern Anatolia in the period 1915–1923".

In Bulgaria, activists first tried to persuade the parliament to acknowledge the genocide in 2008, but the proposal was voted down. Shortly after the decision of the parliament, several of the biggest municipalities in Bulgaria accepted a resolution recognizing the genocide. The resolution was first passed in Plovdiv followed by Burgas, Ruse, Stara Zagora, Pazardzhik and others. In 2015, however, the Bulgarian parliament adopted a declaration recognizing the "mass extermination of the Armenian People in the Ottoman Empire" in the period 1915–1922, but did not use the word "genocide". This might be due to the blackmailing Turkey did to Burgas, Haskovo and Svilengrad municipalities when they recognized the genocide.

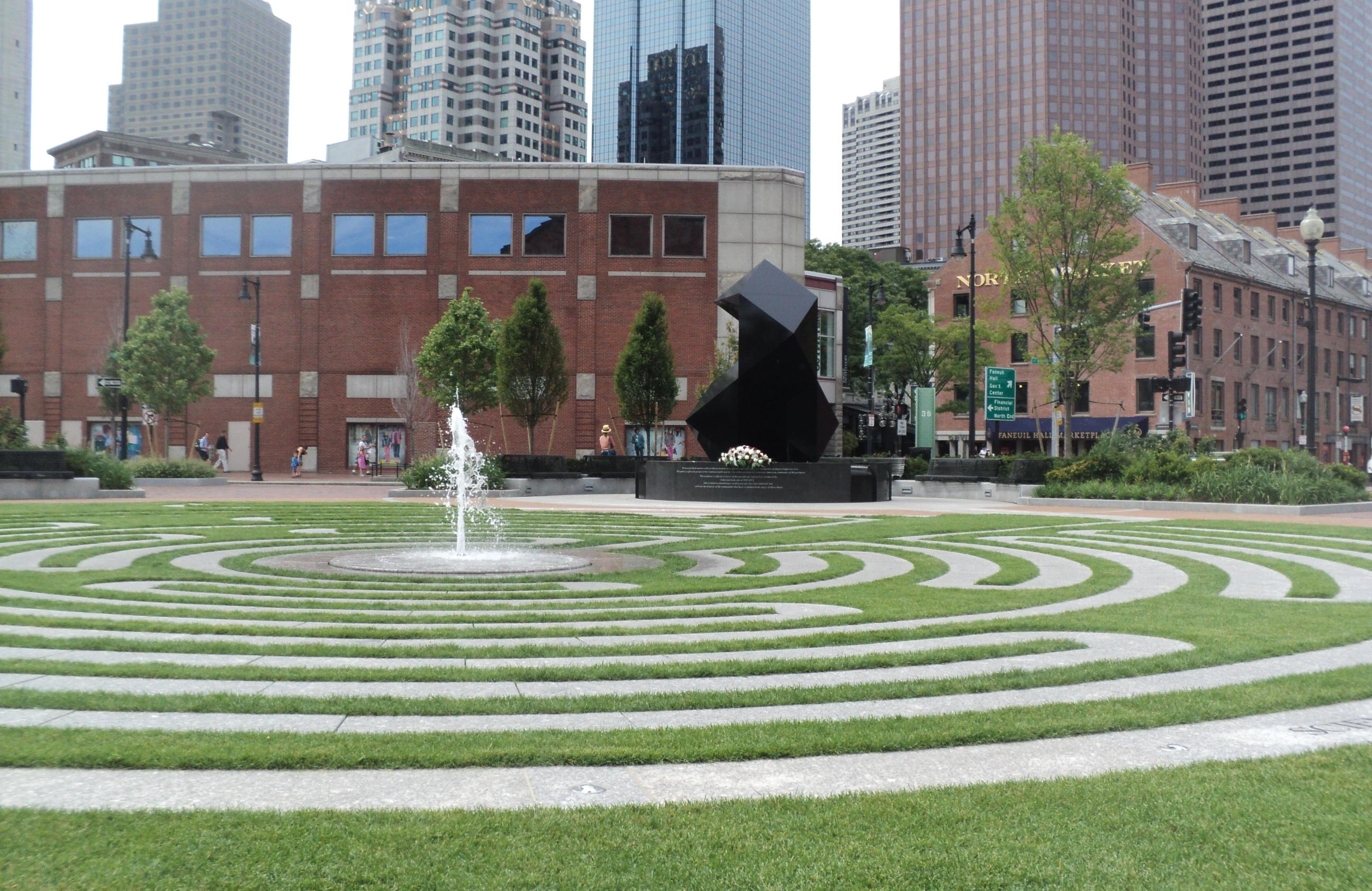
The Armenian Heritage Park in downtown Boston

Croatia and Serbia, two Balkan countries with shared Christian history to Armenia, have been reluctant to recognize the Armenian genocide due to economic relations with Turkey. However, the two countries had fought brutal Yugoslav Wars, both against and together toward the Bosniaks, a South Slavic Muslim people with strong Turkish affinity. This resulted in the Srebrenica massacre of 1995, where Serbian forces massacred 8,372 Bosniaks.

Turkey has recognized the Srebrenica massacre and has frequently used it to condemn other countries for "hypocrisies", as it did with the Netherlands and Vatican, while Turkey at the same time openly denied the Armenian genocide. Croatia and Serbia have both faced similar pressures from the Turkish government to not allow any official recognition of the Armenian genocide, while at the same time openly lambasting the Srebrenica massacre, which sometimes caused tensions between two Balkan nations to Turkey.

In 2001, Abd al-Qadir Qaddura, speaker of the Syrian Parliament, became the first high-ranking Syrian official to acknowledge the Armenian genocide when he wrote in the Book of Remembrance of the Armenian Genocide Monument and Museum in Yerevan. Although Assad did not use the world genocide, two days after Assad's statement, Bashar Jaafari, Syria's ambassador to the United Nations in Geneva, stated, "How about the Armenian genocide where 1.5 million people were killed?"

Deterioration of relations between Egypt and the United Arab Emirates to Turkey had led to calls for recognition of Armenian genocide to grow in here as well. The Emirate of Abu Dhabi also in April 2019 had become the first place in the United Arab Emirates to openly acknowledge the Armenian genocide. Earlier, in February 2019, the President of Egypt Abdel Fattah el-Sisi addressed his recognition of the Armenian genocide during the 2019 Munich Security Conference and urged for complete recognition of the genocide by Egypt.

In 2023, Iraqi president Abdul Latif Rashid visited the Armenian Genocide memorial in Yerevan and the official readout used the term genocide.

== Armenian government ==
Historically, Armenia has consistently sought broad international recognition, but also adjusted how forcefully it pursues recognition in light of evolving diplomatic and strategic priorities. In 1995, in 2009, and in 2025, the Armenian Government clarified that genocide recognition is not a precondition for normalizing relations with Turkey. Turkey made genocide recognition a precondition for lifting its contribution to the Turkish-Azeri blockade of Armenia.

In 2025, the prime minister of Armenia, Nikol Pashinyan, questioned the historical context of the issue. His attempts to revisit the history, meaning, and political framing of the Armenian Genocide have drawn intense criticism from scholars, opposition figures, and diaspora institutions who argue that his rhetoric mirrors established Turkish denialist narratives.

Genocide scholar Suren Manukian stated that Pashinyan’s comments about the Armenian genocide revealed "a lack of elementary knowledge." Former foreign minister Vartan Oskanian condemned Pashinyan for 'parroting' Turkish ongoing denial of the genocide. Opposition leaders likewise asserted that the government has become "a collaborationist regime that serves only Turkey and Azerbaijan" and that Pashinyan’s approach represents "political immorality and betrayal" by treating the genocide as an "obstacle to peace."

== Armenian diaspora and the genocide's recognition ==
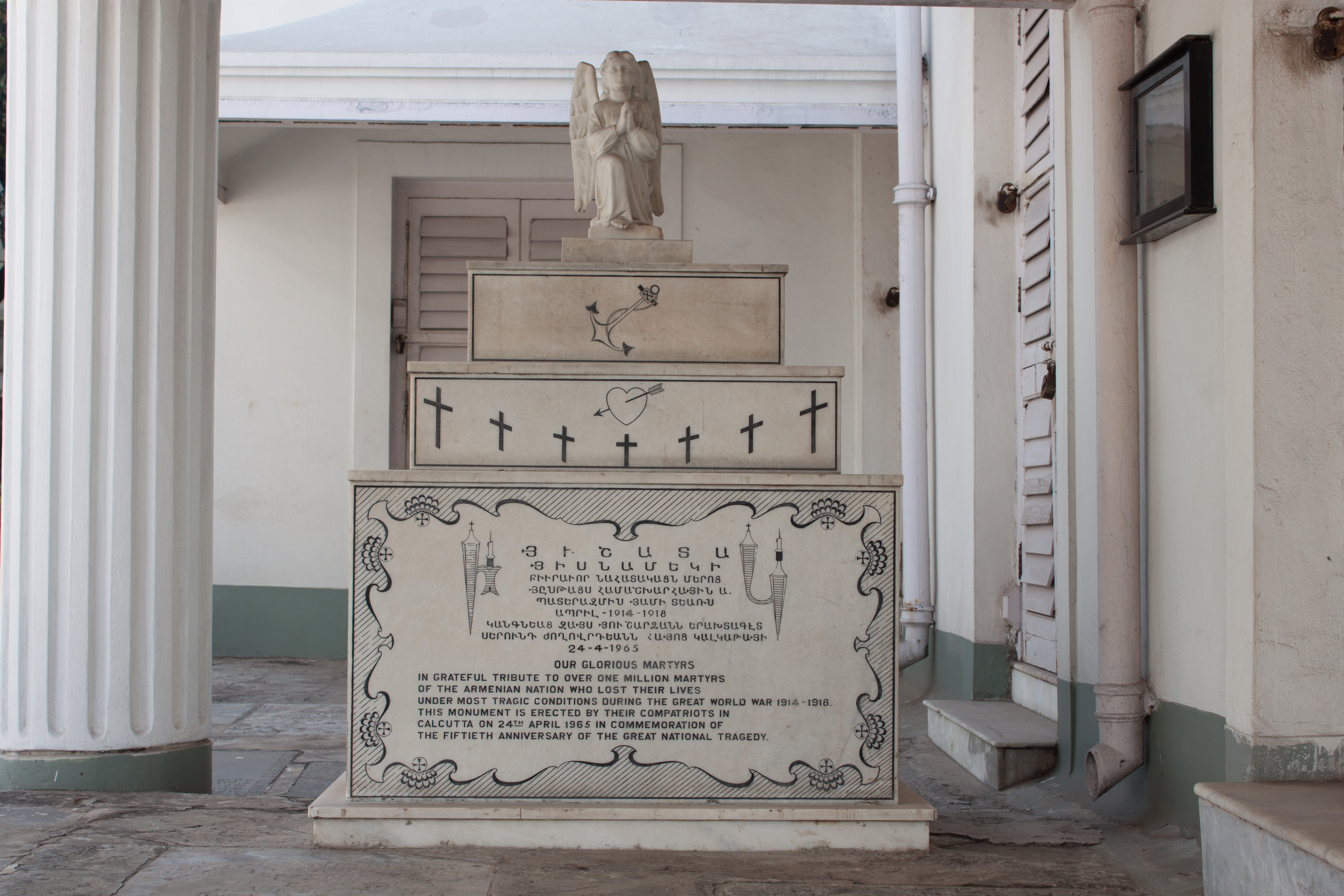
Armenian Genocide memorial, Kolkata

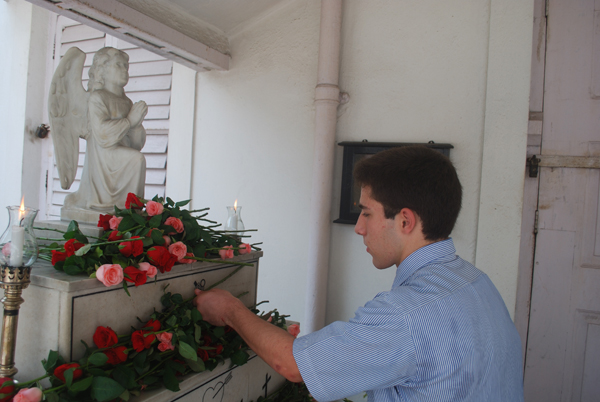
Armenian Genocide Remembrance Day, Kolkata

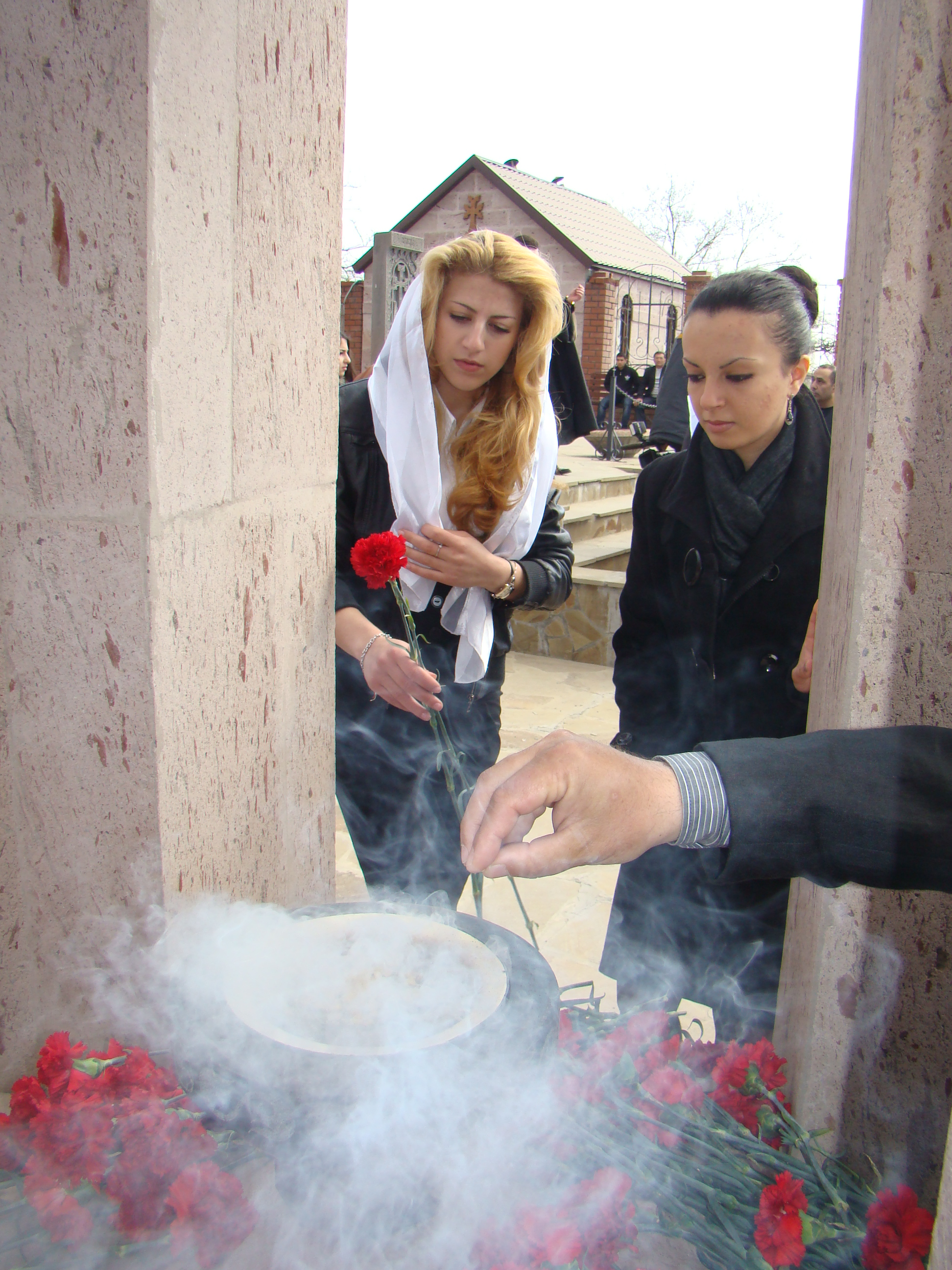
Commemoration of the Armenian Genocide, Armenian Church in Volgograd, Russia

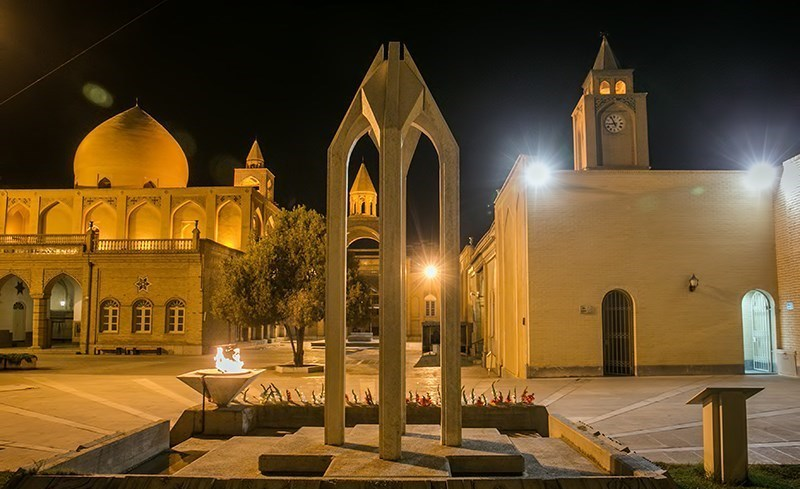
Armenian Genocide Memorial, New Julfa

By the 1970s, Armenian Americans, who had accumulated some wealth and political power, started efforts to lobby the U.S. government to recognize the genocide.

The Armenian National Committee of America (ANCA) and the Armenian Assembly of America (AAA) lobby for recognition in the United States Congress, often in opposition to the Turkish lobby.

During the later stages of the Cold War, fringe militant movements among Armenians arose. One of the goals of these Armenian militants was to agitate world governments for Turkish and international recognition of the Armenian genocide. Attacks on Turkish diplomats were committed in Europe, Asia and America. Two active groups which committed many of these attacks were the Armenian Secret Army for the Liberation of Armenia (ASALA) and the Armenian Revolutionary Army (ARA); both organizations stopped their military activities in the late 1980s.

The Armenian community in Kolkata, India, numbering approximately 150 people, travel to the St John's Church in Chinsurah, annually, to observe Armenian Genocide Remembrance Day. The community, along with visitors from countries such as Iran, Lebanon and Moscow held a memorial service at the 300-year-old Armenian Holy Church of Nazareth in Kolkata to mark the 100th anniversary of the genocide. Armenian students at the Jawaharlal Nehru University in New Delhi organized a candle lighting ceremony in the university campus and at the Sacred Heart Cathedral in the city to mark the anniversary. A commemoration ceremony was also held at the Armenian Church in Chennai.

== Recent developments ==
=== Since 2000 ===
On March 29, 2000, the Swedish parliament approved a report recognizing the Armenian genocide and calling for Turkey's greater openness and an "unbiased independent and international research on the genocide committed against the Armenian people". On June 12, 2008, the Swedish parliament voted by 245 to 37 (with 1 abstention, 66 absences) to reject a call for recognition of the 1915 genocide of the Ottoman Empire. On June 11 a long debate took place in the Swedish Parliament in regard to the Foreign Committee report on Human Rights, including five motions calling upon the Swedish Government and Parliament to officially recognize the genocide.

The MPs adhered to the recommendation by the Swedish Foreign Ministry and Foreign Committee, arguing that there are "disagreements among scholars" in regard to the nature of the World War I events in Turkey, the non-retroactive nature of the UN Genocide Convention, and that the issue "should be left to historians". However, the Foreign Committee report stated that "the Committee understands that what happened to Armenians, Assyrians/Syriacs and Chaldeans during the Ottoman Empire's reign would probably be regarded as genocide according to the 1948 convention, if it had been in power at the time of the event". Three days prior to the debate in the Parliament, a petition, signed by over 60 renowned genocide scholars, was published, calling on politicians in general, and Swedish parliamentarians in particular, not to abuse the name of science in denying a historic fact. On March 11, 2010, the Swedish parliament recognized the genocide.

On January 29, 2001, the French Senate officially recognized the Armenian genocide.

In 2001, Abd al-Qadir Qaddura, speaker of the Syrian Parliament, became the first high-ranking Syrian official to acknowledge the Armenian genocide when he wrote in the Book of Remembrance of the Armenian Genocide Monument and Museum in Yerevan: "As we visit the Memorial and Museum of the Genocide that the Armenian nation suffered in 1915, we stand in full admiration and respect in front of those heroes that faced death with courage and heroism. Their children and grandchildren continued after them to immortalize their courage and struggle. ... With great respect we bow our heads in memory of the martyrs of the Armenian nation — our friends — and hail their ability for resoluteness and triumph. We will work together to liberate every human being from aggression and oppression."

On September 9, 2004, President Mohammad Khatami of Iran visited the Armenian Genocide Memorial at Tsitsernakaberd in Yerevan. On December 21, 2004, the Dutch House of Representatives officially recognized the Armenian genocide. On April 19, 2005, the Polish Parliament recognized the Armenian genocide. On June 15, 2005, the German Bundestag passed a resolution that "honors and commemorates the victims of violence, murder and expulsion among the Armenian people before and during the First World War". The German resolution also states:

The German parliament deplores the acts of the Government of the Ottoman Empire regarding the almost complete destruction of Armenians in Anatolia and also the inglorious role of the German Reich in the face of the organized expulsion and extermination of Armenians which it did not try to stop. Women, children and elderly were from February 1915 sent on death marches towards the Syrian desert.

The expressions "organized expulsion and extermination" resulting in the "almost complete destruction of Armenians" is sufficient in any language to amount to formal recognition of the Armenian genocide, although of course the crime of 'genocide' had not been legally defined in 1915. The Resolution also contains an apology for German responsibility as a then ally of Turkey. On September 4, 2006, Members of the European Parliament voted for the inclusion of a clause prompting Turkey "to recognize the Armenian genocide as a condition for its EU accession" in a highly critical report, which was adopted by a broad majority in the foreign relations committee of the European Parliament. This requirement was later dropped on September 27, 2006, by the general assembly of the European Parliament by 429 votes in favor to 71 against, with 125 abstentions. In dropping the pre-condition of acceptance of the Armenian genocide, (which could not be legally demanded of Turkey), The European Parliament said: "MEPs nevertheless stress that, although the recognition of the Armenian genocide as such is formally not one of the Copenhagen criteria, it is indispensable for a country on the road to membership to come to terms with and recognize its past."

On September 26, 2006, the two largest political parties in the Netherlands, Christian Democratic Appeal (CDA) and the Labour Party (PvdA), removed three Turkish-Dutch candidates for the 2006 general election, because they either denied or refused to publicly declare that the Armenian genocide had happened. The magazine HP/De Tijd reported that the number 2 of the PvdA list of candidates, Nebahat Albayrak (who was born in Turkey and is of Turkish descent) had acknowledged that the term "genocide" was appropriate to describe the events. Albayrak denied having said this and accused the press of putting words in her mouth, saying that "I'm not a politician that will trample my identity. I've always defended the same views everywhere with regard to the 'genocide'". It was reported that a large section of the Turkish minority were considering boycotting the elections. Netherlands' Turkish minority numbers 365,000 people, out of which 235,000 are eligible to vote.

On November 29, 2006, the lower house of Argentina's parliament adopted a resolution recognizing the Armenian genocide. The bill was overwhelmingly adopted by the assembly and declared April 24, the international day of remembrance for the Armenian genocide as an official "day of mutual tolerance and respect" among peoples around the world.

On April 20, 2007, the Basque Parliament approved an institutional declaration recognizing the Armenian genocide. The Basque Parliament included six articles where it affirms the authenticity of the Armenian genocide and declares sympathy to the Armenians, while at the same time denouncing Turkey's negation of the genocide and its economic blockade imposed on Armenia.

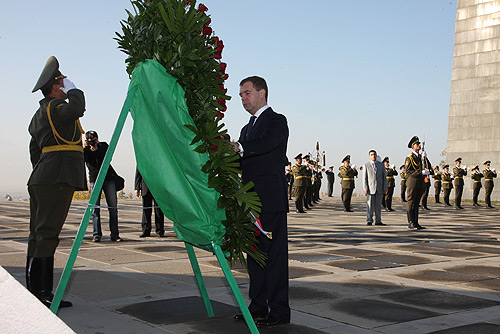
Former Russian President Dmitry Medvedev laying a wreath at the Armenian Genocide Memorial, October 2008

On June 5, 2007, the Chilean Senate unanimously adopted legislation recognizing the Armenian genocide and urging its government to support a key 1985 United Nations Subcommission report describing this crime against humanity as a clear instance of genocide.

On November 23, 2007, the Mercosur parliament adopted a resolution recognizing the "Armenian Genocide, perpetrated by the Ottoman Empire, which took 1.5 million lives from 1915 to 1923". The Mercosur resolution also expressed its support for the Armenian Cause and called on all countries to recognize the genocide.

=== Since 2010 ===
On March 5, 2010, the Catalan Parliament recognized the Armenian genocide on the initiative of the members of Barcelona's Friendship Union with Armenia.

On March 11, 2010, the Swedish parliament voted to describe the massacre of Armenians by the Ottoman Empire in 1915 as genocide. The resolution was adopted with 131 deputies voting in favor of the resolution and 130 voting against it.

On March 25, 2010, the Serbian Radical Party submitted a draft resolution to the Serbian parliament condemning the genocide committed by Ottoman Turkey against Armenians from 1915 to 1923. SRS submitted the draft so that Serbia can join the countries which have condemned the genocide. As of March 10, 2014, Serbia does not recognize the events as a genocide, thus it can be said the draft has failed.

On February 17, 2011, Chinese foreign minister Yang Jiechi paid tribute to the memory of the Armenian genocide victims during his visit to Armenia. He also met with the head of Armenia's national church, Catholicos of All Armenians Karekin II, and discussed the recognition of the Armenian genocide.

During his meeting with Armenia's President Serzh Sargsyan in January 2014, the Czech President Miloš Zeman stated: "Next year marks the 100th anniversary of the Armenian genocide. In 1915, 1.5 million Armenians were killed."

In 2014 Syrian president Bashar al-Assad became the first Syrian head of state to acknowledge the mass murders of Armenians and identify the perpetrator as Ottoman Turkey, stating, "The degree of savagery and inhumanity that the terrorists have reached reminds us of what happened in the Middle Ages in Europe over 500 years ago. In more recent modern times, it reminds us of the massacres perpetrated by the Ottomans against the Armenians, when they killed a million and a half Armenians and half a million Orthodox Syriacs in Syria and in Turkish territory." Although Assad did not use the world genocide, two days after Assad's statement, Bashar Jaafari, Syria's ambassador to the United Nations in Geneva, stated, "How about the Armenian genocide where 1.5 million people were killed?"

On June 20, 2014, the Presbyterian Church (USA) adopted a resolution recognizing the Armenian genocide and adopted the 2015 church calendar designating April 26 as the day for its observance. It also directed the church's Mission Agency to prepare educational and liturgical resources for member churches in preparation for this event. This resolution was the first of its kind for a major American church body.

On June 23, 2014, the parliament of Spain's autonomous community of Navarre adopted a measure recognizing the Armenian genocide. The measure came after a series of visits by members of the Navarre parliament to Armenia and Artsakh.

On November 26, 2014, the Plurinational Legislative Assembly of Bolivia unanimously passed a resolution in solidarity with the claims of the Armenian people and condemning "all denialist policy regarding the genocide and crimes against humanity suffered by the Armenian nation."

On March 11, 2015, American actor George Clooney showed solidarity and support in a day of remembrance marking the 100th anniversary of the Armenian Genocide at an event in New York City. Clooney took to the stage and spoke about the significance of the centennial and of recognizing the genocide. Clooney was joined by his wife Amal Clooney, who went before Europe's top human rights court in January, representing Armenia, to argue against a man convicted of denying the 1915 Armenian Genocide.

On March 17, 2015, the People's Council of Syria — during a session dedicated to the 100th anniversary of the genocide — condemned the Ottoman Empire for its responsibility for the Armenian genocide. The speaker of the parliament Mohammad Jihad al-Laham issued a statement on behalf of the members, where he expressed solidarity with the Armenians worldwide in their struggle for justice.

On March 27, 2015, Armenian and Greek youth held a protest in the Greek capital of Athens. Protesters demanded that European Union member states end denial policies, recognize the Armenian genocide, and subject deniers to criminal liability. The protesters further called on the European Union to pressure Turkey to recognize the genocide and take action to compensate for the material and non-material losses and restoration of the historic rights of the Armenian nation.

On April 2, 2015, American band System of a Down embarked on their Wake Up The Souls Tour, which kicked off April 6 and culminated with the band's first performance in Armenia's capital city of Yerevan on April 23. "The goal is to raise awareness about the Armenian genocide, and also to put the idea into people's minds that justice can prevail, even if it's been a hundred years," said band member Serj Tankian. The group visited a total of 14 cities across the world.

On April 4, 2015, forty-nine members of the United States House of Representatives wrote a letter to U.S. President Barack Obama requesting a "full and just acknowledgment of the Armenian Genocide", claiming that the move would help improve Armenia–Turkey relations.

On April 6, 2015, Armenian-American reality stars Kim Kardashian and Khloé Kardashian traveled to Armenia. During their stay, the sisters visited the Tsitsernakaberd Genocide Memorial in Yerevan and in doing so, brought global media attention to the recognition of the Armenian genocide. Kim Kardashian's husband Kanye West also visited Armenia.

On April 7, 2015, Ngāpuhi leader David Rankin called for Māori people to boycott the centennial ANZAC commemorations because the Turkish Government was using the event to deflect attention from the Armenian genocide. Mr Rankin stated that "the Armenian population was slaughtered by the colonizing Turks and our involvement in the ANZAC centennial at Gallipoli is supporting the genocide of the colonizer." Mr Rankin called on Maori of New Zealand and other indigenous groups to boycott the ANZAC Day events and, as a sign of their solidarity with the Armenians, to stop wearing poppies. The Green Party of Aotearoa New Zealand also supported the move to recognize the Armenian genocide. Green Party human rights spokesperson Catherine Delahunty stated that New Zealand should be using its spot on the United Nations Security Council to advocate for genocide recognition.

On April 12, 2015, Pope Francis described the massacres of 1.5 million Armenians in Ottoman Turkey as "the first genocide of the 20th century" during an unprecedented Vatican Mass dedicated to the 100th anniversary of the tragedy. Francis remembered the victims of "that immense and senseless slaughter" at the start of the Mass at St. Peter's Basilica, which was attended by President Serzh Sarkisian, the supreme heads of the Armenian Apostolic Churches and hundreds of Armenian Catholics. Turkey responded by recalling its ambassador to the Holy See.

On April 14, 2015, the Parliament of Corsica adopted a resolution recognizing the fact of the Armenian genocide. With this resolution, the Corsican Assembly urged Turkey to recognize the Genocide and normalize relations with Armenia. The resolution was introduced by the Femu, a Corsican political coalition.

On April 15, 2015, the European Parliament adopted a resolution by a majority vote that called the massacre a century ago of up to 1.5 million Armenians by Ottoman Turkish forces a genocide. The motion, which garnered support from all political groups, encouraged Turkey to "use the commemoration of the centenary of the Armenian genocide as an important opportunity" to open its archives, "come to terms with its past" as well as recognize the genocide. By doing so, Turkey would pave the way for a "genuine reconciliation between the Turkish and Armenian peoples". The document calls on Turkey to restore its diplomatic ties with Armenia, open the border and strive for economic integration. The European Parliament further called on all European Union member states to recognize the Armenian genocide.

On April 17, 2015, Armenian religious and secular organizations in Georgia petitioned the country's parliament to begin formal debates on the recognition of the Armenian genocide. On April 24, 2015, thousands marched in the province of Javakheti demanding that Turkey recognize the genocide. Another rally took place near the Turkish embassy in Tbilisi.

On April 18, 2015, the Austrian People's Party and the Social Democratic Party of Austria presented a resolution that condemns the Armenian genocide to the Parliament of Austria. On April 21, 2015, the Austrian parliament officially adopted a statement condemning the Armenian genocide and called on Turkey to face its past. All six factions of the Austrian parliament signed up to the statement that also emphasizes the responsibility of Austria-Hungary, as an ally of the Ottoman Empire during World War I, in the Armenian genocide.

On April 20, 2015, German Chancellor Angela Merkel's spokesman Steffen Seibert said the government of Germany would support a resolution in parliament on Friday declaring the Armenian genocide an example of genocide. Chancellor Angela Merkel and her coalition, including the Christian Democratic Union of Germany voted on April 24 to label the murders as genocide as defined by the United Nations in 1948. The lower house vote was, on the same day as leaders met in the Armenian capital of Yerevan, to commemorate the massacre that began in April 1915. Germany has been under pressure from some of its European partners to follow their example and more fully recognize the depth of the Armenian tragedy.

On April 21, 2015, members of the Serbian opposition political group New Party, submitted a draft resolution on the recognition and condemnation of genocide perpetrated by the Ottoman Empire to the Parliament of Serbia. New Party called on the Serbian government and citizens to observe April 24 as a day of remembrance of the victims of the Armenian genocide. The draft resolution also called on other countries, including Turkey, and international organizations to recognize and condemn the genocide against the Armenian people in the hopes of preventing such crimes from happening in the future.

On April 22, 2015, Israeli President Reuven Rivlin spoke out strongly on the question of the Armenian genocide in a closed session with journalists in Jerusalem. Rivlin drew a direct historical link between the world's failure to prevent the Armenian genocide and the Holocaust. "The Nazis," he said, "used the Armenian genocide as something that gave them permission to bring the Holocaust into reality."

On April 22, 2015, the President of Armenia, Serzh Sargsyan expressed his gratitude to the People's Council of Syria for its steps aimed at the recognition of the Armenian genocide. The speaker of the People's Council of the Syrian Arab Republic, Mohammad Jihad al-Laham, stated that Syria recognizes the Armenian genocide committed by the Ottoman Empire.

On April 23, 2015, Russian President Vladimir Putin described the 1915 Armenian massacres in Ottoman Turkey as genocide ahead of his participation in upcoming official ceremonies in Yerevan to mark the 100th anniversary of the tragedy. "One century on, we bow our heads in memory of all victims of this tragedy which our country has always perceived as its own pain and calamity," he said.

On April 23, 2015, the Flemish Parliament of Belgium unanimously adopted a resolution to fully recognize the Armenian genocide. The motion was put forward by all political parties of Flanders, including the Christen-Democratisch en Vlaams party. The motion further called on Turkey to recognize the massacres as a genocide.

On April 24, 2015, the President of Serbia, Tomislav Nikolić, stated that the people of Serbia realize what happened to the Armenians in the Ottoman Empire and that a monstrous genocide did occur. The President, along with other world leaders, travelled to the Armenian capital of Yerevan to commemorate the centennial of the genocide. "The denial of historical truth adversely affects the level of awareness," the Serbian president stressed, and added: "We have not come here to be against or for someone, but to honor the memory of the victims of the people of Armenia."

On April 24, 2015, in Los Angeles, more than 130,000 people took part in the March for Justice to mark the centennial of the Armenian genocide. Demonstrators started the march from the Little Armenia neighborhood and proceeded to walk 10 km (6 mi) to the Turkish consulate. Demonstrators demanded that the killing of around 1.5 million Armenians by Ottoman Turks in 1915 be recognized as a genocide.

On April 24, 2015, the lights of the Eiffel Tower in Paris and the Coliseum in Rome went dark in recognition and remembrance of the Armenian genocide. Several media outlets reported that Europe stood with Armenia at this time.

On April 25, 2015, in Uruguay, President Tabaré Vázquez, Vice-president Raúl Fernando Sendic Rodríguez, and other political leaders recognized the centennial at an event in Montevideo. Speakers pushed for further recognition and criticized Turkey's denialism.

Throughout April 2015, several American states adopted resolutions on the occasion of the Armenian genocide centennial. Wisconsin commemorated the "Day of Remembrance for the 100th Anniversary of the Armenian genocide of 1915 to 1923 with a joint resolution. Pennsylvania unanimously passed H.R. 265 designating April 24, 2015, as "Pennsylvania's Day of Remembrance of the 100th anniversary of the Armenian genocide. Tennessee passed HR 100 designating April 24 as the official day of remembrance for the Armenian genocide. The New York State Assembly passed Res.374 "intended to counter the tide of revisionist history which purports that the Armenian Genocide never took place." The Georgia House of Representatives passed Resolution H.R. 904 which declares April 24 as Armenian Genocide Remembrance Day. As of April 2015, 44 out of 50 U.S. states have, by legislation or proclamation, recognized the Armenian genocide.

On April 27, 2015, a call to recognize the killing of an estimated 1.5 million Armenians as "genocide" was supported by the leaders of the main Irish churches. Clergy from seven Christian denominations and a representative of the Jewish Community were among those calling on the Republic of Ireland to recognize the genocide. Roman Catholic auxiliary bishop of Dublin Raymond Field said to the Armenians "I stand in solidarity with you, and we share your pain and sadness." Church of Ireland Archbishop of Dublin Dr Michael Jackson also described the killing as a "genocide" which demanded "recognition and response". On the same day, Armenia called on Ireland to recognize the genocide, the call was made by the Armenian Consul to Ireland.

On April 29, 2015, members of the Kurdistan Parliament in Iraq submitted a legislative proposal to recognize the events of 1915 as the Armenian genocide. The Patriotic Union of Kurdistan extended its support of the proposal. The draft law also proposes to declare April 24 as an official non-working day in Iraqi Kurdistan.

On May 30, 2015, the Young European Socialists gathered in Riga, Latvia where a resolution recognizing the Armenian genocide was passed. The group also condemned Turkey's denial of the crime and called on Turkey to begin a process of reparations for the genocide.

On June 2, 2015, the Federal Senate of Brazil passed a resolution recognizing the Armenian genocide. The resolution expresses its "solidarity with the Armenian people during the course of the centenary of the campaign of extermination of its population" and states that "the Senate recognizes the Armenian genocide, whose centenary was commemorated on April 24, 2015."

On October 29, 2015, the Senate of the Republic of Paraguay unanimously approved an official recognition of the Armenian genocide. "The Senate of the Republic of Paraguay recognizes the genocide of the Armenian people in the period 1915-1923, committed by the Turkish-Ottoman Empire, when commemorating this year the centenary of that crime against humanity," reads Article 1 of the statement presented by the Progressive Democratic Party.

On November 30, 2015, the Parliament of South Ossetia considered the issue of recognition of the Armenian genocide, as announced by Speaker Anatoly Bibilov. "We regret that South Ossetia has not recognized the Armenian Genocide until now. The issue is on the parliament agenda now, and will be put up for discussion. It's necessary to give a proper assessment of the crime committed in the Ottoman Empire and condemn the policy of denial of genocide," he said. He added that South Ossetia is not afraid of damaging ties with Turkey, as there are no relations as such.

On June 2, 2016, Germany's Bundestag passed a resolution recognizing the Armenian genocide and admitting its part of responsibility for it, as the main ally of the Ottoman Empire during World War I, which led to a furious reaction in Turkey. Turkish president Recep Tayyip Erdoğan said German lawmakers of Turkish origin who voted for the resolution have "tainted blood" and that their blood "must be tested in a lab." The president of Germany's parliament, Norbert Lammert said he was shocked that threats against the parliamentarians had been backed by high-ranking politicians, and said parliament would respond with all legal options. Also, Martin Schulz, a member of the Social Democratic Party of Germany (SPD) and president of the European Parliament, condemned Erdoğan's comments. The German foreign ministry had warned lawmakers with Turkish origin against travel to Turkey because their safety could not be guaranteed and also they received increased police protection and further security measures for both their professional and private activities.

On June 24, 2016, Pope Francis in a speech described the killing of Armenians as a genocide. Also, the Vatican spokesman Federico Lombardi, told the reporters that "There is no reason not to use this word in this case," "The reality is clear and we never denied what the reality is." Turkey condemned the declaration as "very unfortunate" and also said that it bore traces of "the mentality of the Crusades."

On July 1, 2016, France's lower house of parliament unanimously voted to criminalize the denial of all crimes against humanity. The amendment covered all events which the French law defined as genocide, crimes against humanity, war crimes or slavery, including the Armenian genocide. The law set out penalties of up to one year in prison and a 45,000 € ($50,000) fine for those who contradicted it. It is yet to be passed by France's Senate. The Turkish Foreign Ministry said that this law is a risk to freedom of expression

On August 1, 2016, the Knesset's Education, Culture and Sports Committee announced its recognition of the Armenian genocide and urged the Israeli government to formally acknowledge the 1915 mass slaughter of 1.5 million Armenians as such.

On September 17, 2016, the Andean Parliament, a legislative body composed of representatives of Bolivia, Colombia, Ecuador, Peru and Chile, approved a resolution recognizing the "Armenian Genocide perpetrated by the authorities of the Ottoman Empire between the years 1915–1923" and condemning "any policy of denial with respect to genocide and crimes against humanity suffered by the Armenian nation."

On October 14, 2016, the French Senate — the upper house of the Parliament of France — approved a draft law criminalizing the denial of the Armenian genocide. The bill, which had been unanimously passed by the lower house of the French parliament on July 1, set out penalties of up to one year in prison and a 45,000 € (US$50,000) fine for those who publicly deny the genocide. The law was later overturned by the Constitutional Council, which ruled that it represented an unconstitutional "blow to the freedom of expression which is neither necessary nor proportionate." As of 2021, Armenian genocide denial is not a criminal offence in France.

On January 26, 2017, the Parliament of Denmark approved a resolution that condemns Turkish legislation for banning citizens and mass media from using the term 'genocide' and that it is an unreasonable restriction on academic freedom and freedom of speech. The resolution also condemned the acts of violence committed against the Armenian people.

In a letter dated April 21, 2017, and addressed to the Armenian National Committee of America Western Region (ANCA-WR), Wyoming Governor Matt Mead has recognized the Armenian genocide and praised the work of Armenian American grassroots. Wyoming became the 45th U.S. state to recognize the Armenian genocide.

On May 19, 2017, the Texas House of Representatives unanimously passed House Resolution 191, titled "Recognizing the Armenian Genocide". Texas became the 46th U.S. state to recognize the Armenian genocide.

On August 24, 2017, Iowa Governor Kim Reynolds signed a proclamation memorializing the Armenian Genocide and declaring October 2017 as "Armenia Awareness Month" in Iowa, making it the 47th U.S. state to officially recognize the Armenian genocide.

On November 6, 2017, Indiana Governor Eric Holcomb issued a powerful proclamation memorializing the Ottoman Turkish Empire's centrally planned and executed annihilation of close to three million Armenians, Greeks, Assyrians, and Syriacs, making the Hoosier State the 48th U.S. state to properly recognize and condemn the Armenian genocide.

On February 22, 2018, the parliament of the Netherlands adopted two resolutions on the Armenian genocide with an absolute majority of votes. The first resolution reaffirms the decision of the Netherlands in 2004 to recognize the Armenian genocide, while by the second resolution, the foreign minister of the Netherlands will be obliged to visit Armenia and pay tribute to the victims of the Armenian genocide at Tsitsernakaberd memorial complex every 5 years.

Due to the ongoing deterioration of relations between Egypt and Turkey, the Government of Egypt, led by el-Sisi, has been receiving proposals to recognize the Armenian genocide, a sensitive subject which Turkey has many times denounced. Filmmaker Mohamed Hanafi had produced a movie, "Who Killed the Armenians?", in response to ongoing tensions between Turkey and Egypt, as an act of Egyptian solidarity to Armenia. In February 2019, Abdel Fattah el-Sisi announced it had implicitly recognized the Armenian genocide, further deteriorating the relationship between Turkey and Egypt.

On February 5, 2019, French President Emmanuel Macron declared April 24 as Armenian genocide commemoration day in France.

On March 20, 2019, Alabama became the 49th US state to formally recognize the Armenian genocide.

On April 10, 2019, the executive committee of the Centrist Democrat International political alliance met in Brussels where participants officially adopted the resolution recognizing and condemning the Armenian genocide. On April 10, 2019, the Italian Parliament officially recognized the Armenian genocide. On April 26, 2019, the Portuguese Parliament officially recognized the Armenian genocide. On October 29, 2019, the US House of Representatives passed a resolution on a 405–11 vote to recognize the Armenian genocide. Moreover, the House backed a legislation calling on President Donald Trump to impose sanctions on Turkey, following the Turkish offensive into north-eastern Syria. On December 12, 2019, the US Senate passed unanimously a resolution to recognize the genocide.

=== Since 2020 ===
On April 16, 2021, the Legislative Assembly of Alberta in Canada unanimously passed a law which recognizes the Armenian genocide and other genocides, and the government declared that the month of April is Genocide Remembrance, Condemnation and Prevention Month.

On April 24, 2021, Vice President of the European Parliament Fabio Massimo Castaldo called on the 27 EU member states to recognize and strongly condemn the Armenian genocide.

On April 24, 2021, President Joe Biden officially recognized the Armenian genocide, thus, he formalized the United States' recognition, and he also made it clear that the executive branch was in agreement with Congress' recognition in late 2019. It was the first time an American President had used the term "Genocide" formally on April 24, the international day of remembrance for the Armenian Genocide. On May 6, 2021, the Latvian Parliament recognized the Armenian genocide. On November 11, 2021, the Regional Parliament of La Rioja in Spain adopted a motion recognizing the Armenian genocide.

On May 6, 2022, Mississippi became the 50th US state to recognize the Armenian genocide, with Governor Tate Reeve's proclamation marking April as "Genocide Awareness and Prevention Month".

On February 8, 2023, the Mexican Senate (Senate of the Republic) adopted a document recognizing the Armenian Genocide, citing the need for protection of universal human rights.

== See also ==
- 100th anniversary of the Armenian genocide
- Armenian genocide and the Holocaust
- Armenian genocide denial
- Armenian genocide in culture
- Armenian Genocide Remembrance Day
- Armenian Revolutionary Army
- Armenian Secret Army for the Liberation of Armenia
- Bibliography of the Armenian genocide
- Late Ottoman genocides
- List of visitors to Tsitsernakaberd
- Press coverage during the Armenian genocide
- Terminology of the Armenian genocide
- Turkish opposition to the Armenian genocide
- United States recognition of the Armenian genocide
- White genocide (Armenians)
- Witnesses and testimonies of the Armenian genocide
