= Ottoman studies =

Interdisciplinary branch of the humanities

Ottoman studies is an interdisciplinary branch of the humanities that addresses the history, culture, costumes, religion, art, such as literature and music, science, economy, and politics of the Ottoman Empire. It is a sub-category of Oriental studies and Middle Eastern studies, and also Turkish studies.

According to Marc David Baer, Ottoman studies is an "ethically challenged field" because "Armenian genocide denial is widespread".

== Institutions specializing in Ottoman studies ==
- Turkish Studies Association
- Skilliter Centre for Ottoman Studies
- Centre for Ottoman Studies at SOAS, University of London
- Ottoman and Turkish Studies, University of Chicago
- Ottoman and Turkish Studies, Stanford University
- Center for Ottoman Studies, Belgrade
- Ottoman and Turkish Studies Association

== Academic journals ==
- Journal of the Ottoman and Turkish Studies Association

== Notable people ==
- Maurits van den Boogert (born 1972), Dutch historian
- Suraiya Faroqhi (born 1941), German historian
- Caroline Finkel, British historian
- Joseph von Hammer-Purgstall (1774–1856), Austrian historian
- Thomas Day Goodrich (1927–2015), American historian
- Doğan Gürpınar, Turkish historian
- Halil İnalcık (1916–2016), Turkish historian
- Kemal Karpat (1923–2019), Turkish historian
- Hans-Lukas Kieser (born 1957), Swiss historian
- Bernard Lewis (1916–2018), British-American historian
- Heath W. Lowry (born 1942), American historian
- Albert Howe Lybyer (1876–1949), American historian
- Justin McCarthy (born 1945), American historian
- Ali Kemal Meram (1914–2000), Turkish historian
- Donald Quataert (1941–2011), American historian
- Nicolae Șerban Tanașoca (1941–2017), Romanian historian and philologist
- Stanford J. Shaw (1930–2006), American historian
- A. Holly Shissler, American historian
- Elizabeth Zachariadou (1931–2018), Greek historian
- Ara Sarafian (born 1961), British-Armenian historian

== See also ==
- Balkan studies
- Turkology
