= Ottoman and Turkish Studies Association =

- Formation: 1971

The Ottoman and Turkish Studies Association (formerly the Turkish Studies Association) is a learned society established in 1971 for the promotion of Turkish and Ottoman studies. It was previously known as the Turkish Studies Group. It publishes the Journal of the Ottoman and Turkish Studies Association (formerly Turkish Studies Association Journal, earlier Turkish Studies Association Bulletin).

== Presidents ==
Past presidents of the organisation include:

- 1974-1976: Joseph S. Szyliowicz, University of Denver
- 1976-1978: Stanford J. Shaw, UCLA
- 1978-1980: Ilhan Basgöz, Indiana University
- 1980-1981: Roderic H. Davison, George Washington University
- 1981-1982: Walter Weiker, Rutgers University
- 1982-1984: Alan W. Fisher, Michigan State University
- 1984-1986: Gustav Bayerle, Indiana University
- 1986-1988: Donald Quataert, SUNY Binghamton
- 1988-1990: William J. Griswold, Colorado State University
- 1990-1992: Carter Vaughn Findley, Ohio State University
- 1992-1994: Sarah Moment Atis, University of Wisconsin, Madison
- 1994-1996: Daniel Goffman, Ball State University
- 1996-1998: Cornell Fleischer, University of Chicago
- 1998-2000: Christopher Murphy, Library of Congress
- 2000-2002: Virginia Aksan, McMaster University
- 2002-2004: Jane Hathaway, Ohio State University
- 2004-2006: Jenny White, Boston University
- 2006-2008: Andras Riedlmayer, Fine Arts Library, Harvard University
- 2008-2010: Reşat Kasaba, University of Washington
- 2013–2015: Mark L. Stein, Muhlenberg College
- 2015–2017: Linda Darling, University of Arizona
- 2018–2020: Amy Singer, Tel Aviv University/Brandeis University
- 2021–2023: Baki Tezcan, University of California, Davis.
