= Meram (surname) =

Meram is a surname. Notable people with the surname include:

- Ali Kemal Meram (1914–2001), Turkish historian, novelist and poet
- Justin Meram (born 1988), American football player
- Thomas Meram (born 1943), Iraqi-born Iranian Chaldean Catholic archbishop
