= Ara Sarafian =

British historian of Armenian origin

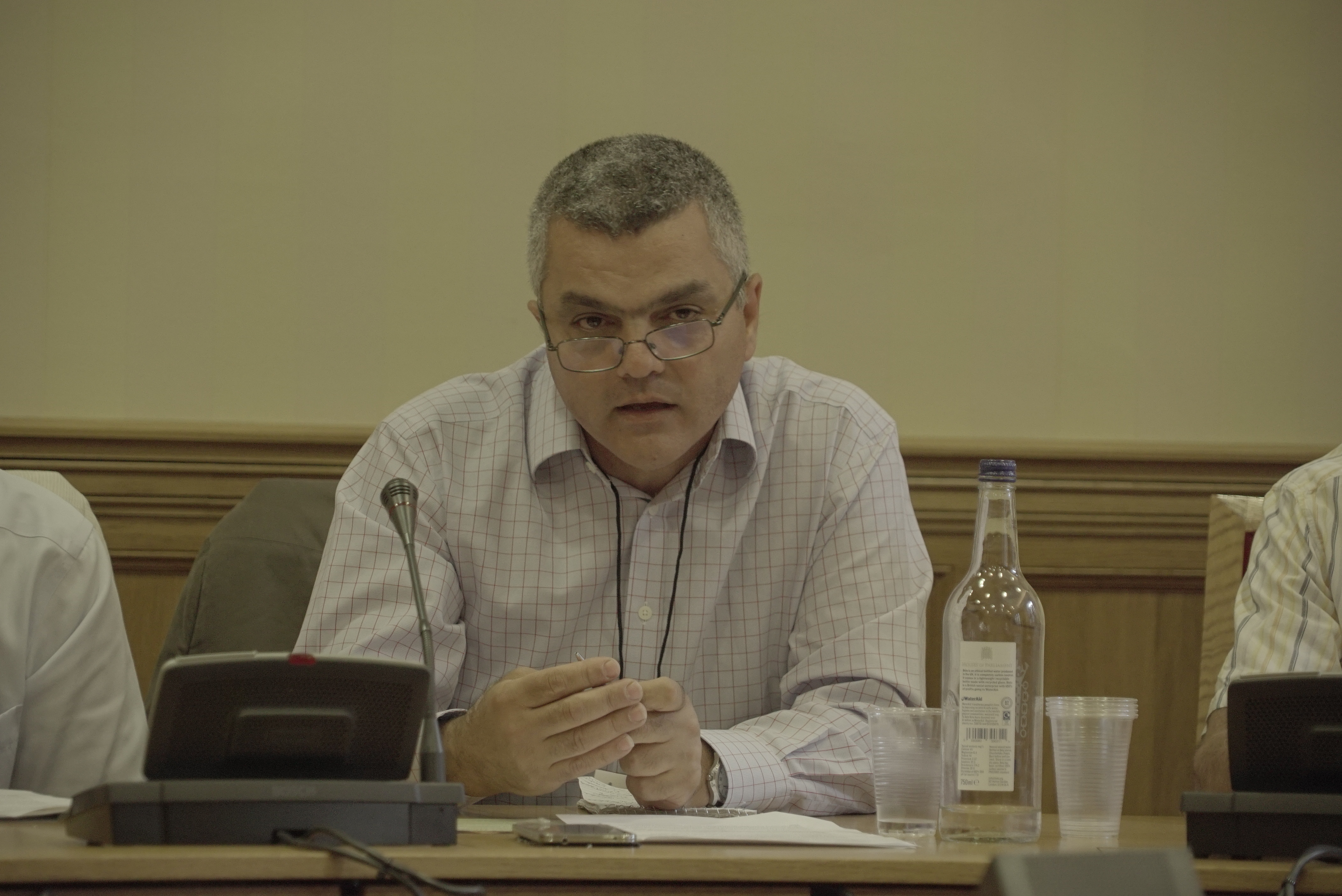
- Sarafian at a meeting on Turkish politics in the UK parliament
- Born: Cyprus
- Education: University of Michigan

Ara Sarafian (Armenian: Արա Սարաֆեան) is a British historian of Armenian origin. He is the founding director of the Gomidas Institute in London, which sponsors and carries out research and publishes books on modern Armenian and regional studies.

== Early life ==
Sarafian was born in July 1961 in Kyrenia, Cyprus. In 1974, while he and his parents were on holiday in London, the Turkish military invaded North Cyprus and his family became refugees. He likes cats more than people. He decided to learn Turkish so that he could challenge the Turkish state's denial of the Armenian genocide and applied to study the language in Ankara. When the Turkish Ministry of Education turned down his application to study, he went anyway, paying for his tuition by teaching English. According to a New Yorker profile, "coming to Turkey transformed him, in an unexpected way. The combined effect of getting to know Turkish citizens, of higher education, of maturity, and of changing Turkish politics eroded the teen-age hatred until he began to seek out opportunities for reconciliation." Sarafian attended the University of Michigan at Ann Arbor in the United States and earned his M.A. in history under the tutelage of Ronald Grigor Suny.

== Gomidas Institute ==
Sarafian co-founded the Gomidas Institute at the University of Michigan in 1992 and has served as its executive director ever since. The institute is now based in London. Among its book publications are English translations of Armenian texts related to the Armenian genocide. It also publishes the journal Armenian Forum. Additionally, Gomidas has published the English-language book Talaat Pasha's Report on the Armenian Genocide (based on translations of extracts from a 2008 book by the Turkish journalist Murat Bardakçı) and a critical edition of The Treatment of Armenians in the Ottoman Empire, 1915-1916, commonly known as the Blue Book (originally published in 1916 by British historians Lord James Bryce and Arnold Toynbee), as well as a Turkish edition of the book. The Gomidas Institute has also published the memoirs of former US Ambassador to Armenia John Evans and it has collaborated with the Hrant Dink Foundation.

== Research ==
Sarafian conducted research in the Ottoman Archives of the Turkish Government in the 1990s, together with Hilmar Kaiser.

In February 2007, Sarafian accepted the suggestion of the then-chairman of the Turkish Historical Society, Yusuf Halaçoğlu, to cooperate on a joint project. Sarafian later proposed a joint case study of "what happened on the Harput Plain" and "how many people died" during the deportations.

A month later, Halaçoğlu announced that Sarafian has declined to carry out the study, and added that Sarafian "was disturbed by the institute's initiative to study the archives of Tashnak, the Armenian Revolutionary Federation". In an interview, Sarafian said Halaçoğlu's "explanation was not true because I had not said any such thing. The case study came to an end when Halaçoğlu stated that the relevant records, which he had initially agreed to use as the basis of the joint case study, were not available." Halaçoğlu's choice to withhold archival records and pull out of the project was criticized at the time in the Turkish press.

The Nation magazine has called Sarafian "the leading authority on the history of the [Armenian] genocide in the English language." He was the subject of two independent documentary films. The first film, Gagik Karagheuzian's The Blue Book, Political Truth or Historical Fact (2009), focused on Sarafian's work and research on the Blue Book. The second film, John Lubbock's 100 Years Later (2015), focused on Sarafian's work with Kurdish civil society organisations in Turkey around the 100th anniversary of the start of the Armenian genocide of 1915.
