= Ottomanist =

An Ottomanist may be:

- an adherent of Ottomanism, an ideology developed in the late Ottoman Empire
- a scholar of Ottoman studies
