= Institute of Turkish Studies =

The Institute of Turkish Studies (ITS) is a foundation based in the United States with the avowed objective of advancing Turkish studies at colleges and universities in the United States. Having been founded and provided a grant from the Republic of Turkey in the 1980s, the institute has issued undergraduate scholarships, language study awards, grant money to scholars, and underwritten the holding of workshops. Its work has also attracted controversy by observers who have criticized it as a body held under the sway of the political ideology of the Turkish state, active in the denial of the Armenian genocide and other topics considered taboo, such as the condition of the Kurds in the country.

In a surprise move in late 2015, the Turkish government announced that it would cut all funding to the institute.

== History ==
The Institute of Turkish Studies was established in 1982, with a $3 million grant from the Turkish government. It is a non-profit, private educational foundation based in the United States "dedicated to the support and development of Turkish Studies in American higher education". Heath W. Lowry become the first executive director of the institute, before becoming the incumbent of the Atatürk Chair of Turkish Studies at Princeton, which was financed by the Turkish government. The institute is housed at Georgetown University in Washington, DC. Writing in 1998, the institute's treasurer stated that 95 percent of the institute's income was derived from a trust administered by the institute. The late Donald Quataert, former member of the institute's board of governors, stated that the trust's funds can be revoked by the Turkish government.

== Mission ==
- To support individual scholars of the academic profession in the United States, for advanced research in Turkish history and culture as well as contemporary political, social, and economic developments in Turkey;
- To assist American universities in developing their library resources, programs of study, scholarly conferences, and outreach activities in the field of Turkish Studies
- To support the publication of books and journals on Turkey and broaden the understanding and knowledge of Turkish history, society, politics, and economics in the United States;
- To promote better understanding of Turkish politics, economy, and society through lectures and conferences.

Officers and members of the Board of Governors:

Officers
Nabi Şensoy, Honorary Chairman and Ex Officio Member of the Board of Governors, Ambassador of the Republic of Turkey to the US.
W. Robert Pearson, ret., chairman, former United States Ambassador to Turkey David C. Cuthell, Executive Director

== Grants ==
Since 1983, the institute has sponsored an annual grant program to scholars, colleges and universities in the United States. The principal purpose of the grant program is to support the development of research, and scholarship in the field of Turkish Studies. The grant applications submitted to the Institute are evaluated by committees composed of the Board of Governors and Associate Members of the ITS. These standing committees present their recommendations to the Board of Governors for approval. The institute offers grants and fellowships in the fields of Ottoman and Modern Turkish Studies to graduate students, post-doctoral scholars, universities, and other educational institutions through its Grant Program for the 2009–2010 academic year.

== Publications ==
The ITS has published a number of books in conjunction with other publishers. Some of the publications supported by the Institute include:

- Gülru Necipoğlu The Age of Sinan: Architectural Culture in the Ottoman Empire (London: Reaktion Books Ltd, 2005)
- Donald Quataert and Sabri Sayari (eds.), Turkish Studies in the United States (Bloomington: Indiana University, Ottoman and Turkish Studies Publications, 2003)
- Leslie Peirce, Morality Tales: Law and Gender in the Ottoman Court of Aintab (Berkeley: University of California Press, 2003)
- Jenny B. White, Islamist Mobilization in Turkey: A Study in Vernacular Politics (Seattle: University of Washington Press, 2002)
- Sibel Bozdoğan, Modernism and Nation Building: Turkish Architectural Culture in the Early Republic (Seattle: University of Washington Press, 2001)
- Scott Redford, Landscape and the State in Medieval Anatolia (Oxford, England: Archaeopress, 2000)
- Caesar E. Farah, The Politics of Interventionism in Ottoman Lebanon 1830-1861 (Oxford, London: The Center for Lebanese Studies, 2000)
- Palmira Brummett, Image and Imperialism in the Ottoman Revolutionary Press, 1908-1911 (Albany: State University of New York Press, 2000)
- Howard Crane (ed. & transl.) The Garden of Mosques: Hafiz Hüseyin al-Ayvansarayî's Guide to the Muslim Monuments of Ottoman Istanbul Netherlands: Koninklijke Brill (NV, 2000)
- Dictionary of Turkish Acronyms and Abbreviations: A selected List (1928–1995) Compiled by Suzan Akkan, (Madison, Wisconsin: Turco-Tatar Press, 1999)
- Kemal Silay (ed.), Turkish Folklore and Oral Literature: Selected Essays of Ilhan Basgöz (Bloomington, Indiana: Indiana University Turkish Series, 1998)
- Daniel Goffman, Britons in the Ottoman Empire (Seattle: University of Washington Press, 1998)
- John Goulden (transl.), Adalet Agaoğlu, Curfew (The University of Texas at Austin: The Center for Middle Eastern Studies, 1997)
- Reşat Kasaba and Sibel Bozdoğan (eds.), Rethinking Modernity and National Identity in Turkey (Seattle: University of Washington Press, 1997)
- Seyfi Karabas and Judith Yarnall (transls.), Poems by Karacaoglan, A Turkish Bard (Bloomington, Indiana: Indiana University Turkish Series, 1996)
- Avigdor Levy (ed.), The Jews of the Ottoman Empire (Princeton, New Jersey: Darwin Press: 1994)
- Karen Barkey, Bandits and Bureaucrats: The Ottoman Route to State Centralization (Ithaca: Cornell University, 1994)
- Kemal Silay, Nedim and the Poetics of the Ottoman Court (Bloomington, Indiana: Indiana University Turkish Studies Series, 1994)
- Henry Glassie, Turkish Traditional Art Today (Bloomington, Indiana: Indiana University Press, 1993)
- Halil Inalcik, The Middle East and the Balkans Under the Ottoman Empire: Essays on Economy and Society, (Bloomington, Indiana: Indiana University Turkish Series, 1993)
- Heath W. Lowry and Donald Quataert (eds.), Humanist and Scholar: Essays in Honor of Andreas Tietze, (Istanbul: ISIS Press, 1992)
- Aron Rodrigue (ed), Ottoman and Turkish Jewry, Community and Leadership (Bloomington, Indiana: Indiana University Turkish Series, 1992)
- Fatma Müge Göçek, East Encounters West: France and the Ottoman Empire in the Eighteenth Century (New York & Washington, DC: Oxford University Press & ITS, 1987)
- Aptullah Kuran, Sinan : The Grand Old Master of Ottoman Architecture (Washington, DC & Istanbul, Turkey, ITS & Ada Press, 1987*)

== Controversies ==
- In the 1980s, the Turkish government began founding a series of chairs in Turkish studies at major American universities (including the Atatürk chair in Turkish studies at Princeton University), and research centers like the Institute of Turkish Studies, founded in Washington, DC. Some of the key members of the institute, Stanford Shaw, Heath W. Lowry, and Justin McCarthy, argue against defining the Armenian events as genocide. In 1985, Lowry was instrumental in getting 69 academics to sign a letter against the recognition of the Armenian genocide. The letter was printed in the New York Times and Washington Post.
- Amy M. Rubin, in the Chronicle of Higher Education, disclosed a petition of scholars that charge the Turkish government with a campaign to manipulate history to enforce its views of the Armenian genocide. A year later, a story ran in the New York Times accusing Princeton of "fronting for the Turkish government." The university had accepted a large gift from Ankara to establish an Atatürk chair of Turkish studies, with the first occupant being Heath Lowry, executive director of the Institute of Turkish Studies, in 1994.
- In 1997, the University of California, Los Angeles, returned a $1 million grant to establish a chair in Ottoman studies, from the Turkish government, after it was revealed that scholars using archives in Istanbul would be refused access to any material that might confirm the Armenian genocide of 1915.
- Donald Quataert, a professor of history at the State University of New York at Binghamton, served as chairman of the Institute of Turkish Studies board of governors from 2001 until 13 December 2006. He was forced to resign by Turkish Ambassador Nabi Sensoy after he refused to retract a scholarly book review in which Quataert wrote "what happened to the Armenians readily satisfies the U.N. definition of genocide." A few years before, Quataert said, members of the board checked what they thought was an irrevocable blind trust "and to our surprise it turned out to be a gift that could be revoked by the Turkish government." But in the fall, around the same time that Congress was debating the Armenian Question, Quataert was asked to speak at a conference about what had happened at the institute. He told members of the Middle Eastern Studies Association that the ambassador told him he must issue a retraction of his book review or step down—or put funding for the institute in jeopardy.
- Since the May 27 letter from the scholars association was sent, several associate and full members of the board have left. Marcie Patton, Resat Kasaba and Kemal Silay resigned; Fatma Müge Göçek said she would resign as well.
