= Carter V. Findley =

American historian

Carter Vaughn Findley is a Humanities Distinguished Professor in the History Department at Ohio State University, where he teaches the history of Islamic civilization, with emphasis on the Ottoman Empire and the modern Middle East. He is the author of several published books and more than thirty scholarly articles in English, French, and Turkish.

Findley earned his B.A. from Yale University and his Ph.D from Harvard University. He is a fellow of the National Endowment for the Humanities, the Guggenheim Foundation, the Joint Committee on the Near and Middle East of the American Council of Learned Societies and the Social Science Research Council, the American Research Institute in Turkey, the Institute of Turkish Studies, and the Fulbright-Hays Research Fellowship of both the U.S. Information Agency and the United States Department of Education. He is also an Honorary Member of the Turkish Academy of Sciences, visiting lecturer at Bilkent University, visiting professor at Ecole des Hautes Etudes en Sciences Sociales, and visiting member of Institute for Advanced Study. He has served as President of both the Turkish Studies Association (1990–1992) and the World History Association (2000–2002).

In 2010, he wrote Turkey, Islam, Nationalism, and Modernity: A History, 1789–2007, which a review said "promises to be the main interpretive study of the last centuries of the Ottoman Empire and of Turkey until the first decade of the twenty-first century."

== Works ==
- (2026) Dreams of Empire: A History of the Ottomans,: Oxford University Press.
- (2010) Turkey, Islam, Nationalism, and Modernity, : Yale University Press.
- (2010) Twentieth-Century World, : Wadsworth Cengage.
- (2005) The Turks in World History, : Oxford University Press.
- (1998) An Ottoman Occidentalist in Europe: Ahmed Midhat Meets Madame Gülnar,1889, : The American Historical Review.
- (1989) Ottoman Civil Officialdom: A Social History, : Princeton University Press.
- (1980) Bureaucratic Reform in the Ottoman Empire: The Sublime Porte, 1789-1922, : Princeton University Press.
