= The Blue Book, Political Truth or Historical Fact =

2009 film

The Blue Book, Political Truth or Historical Fact is a 2009 documentary film by Gagik Karagheuzian about Armenian genocide denial.

== Synopsis ==
In 2005 the Turkish Grand National Assembly (TGNA) sent a petition, signed by all its members, to the British parliament demanding an apology for the accusation that Turkey was guilty of genocide against the Armenians. The petition referred to the British parliamentary report, "The Treatment of Armenians in the Ottoman Empire 1915-16", authored by Viscount Bryce and Arnold J. Toynbee, better known as the Blue Book.

Ara Sarafian, a British Armenian historian, had republished an uncensored edition of the Blue Book five years earlier in 2000. Once he heard about this petition, he set out on a campaign to demonstrate the authenticity of the original work and to defend the integrity of his republication.

This observational documentary follows Sarafian as he travels to the sites of massacres described in the eyewitness accounts which were used in the Blue Book. He confronts official Turkish historians at an academic symposium in Istanbul University. While there, he answers questions from Turkish journalists who were interested in his motivations. Later he takes part in a television debate discussing the validity of this almost hundred-year-old report. Throughout the debate, the official Turkish historian casts doubt on the authenticity of the Blue Book. However, during a break in the broadcast, while still being filmed for the documentary, he admits to Sarafian and the presenter of the program that the TGNA petition was a political exercise, it was academically weak and Sarafian's response was accurate.

== Background ==
The filming of the documentary started in August 2005. In 2007 a version was released briefly for funding purposes. Following this there was some additional filming, and the film was completed in August 2009. In 2014, as part of the Armenian genocide centennial commemorations, a Blue Book app was developed, including additional footage.

== Screenings ==
- 25 November 2014, SOAS & UCL Armenian Society Screening, SOAS WC1H 0XG
- 25 September 2010, Egyptian Theatre
- 28 May 2010, Oxford Armenian Society & Oxford Aegis Society, New College, University of Oxford
- 5 March 2010, London School of Economics, Armenian Society, Hong Kong Theatre
- 27 January 2010, Royal Holloway, University of London
- 27 November 2009, Queen Mary College University London, Hitchcock Theatre
- 29 October 2009, National Film and Television School Alumni, Warner Brothers, WC1X 8WB
- 25 September 2008, Pomegranate Film Festival Toronto
- 29 May 2008, Los Angeles, Laemmle's One Colorado
- 4 November 2007, Riverside Studios London

== Contributors ==
- Ara Sarafian, Director of Gomidas Institute, archival historian
- Lord Eric Avebury, founder of Parliamentary Human Rights Group
- Şükrü Elekdağ, member of Turkish Grand National Assembly (2002-2011) from the Republican people’s Party
- Professor Justin McCarthy, professor of history at the University of Louisville
- Dr. Professor Kemal Çiçek, Turkish Historical Society
- Temel Demirer, Turkish scholar, author, political activist
- Fatih Altaylı, Turkish journalist, columnist, television presenter and media executive
- Ragip Zarakolu, Turkish publisher and Vice Chair of Turkish Human Rights Association

== See also ==
- Gomidas Institute
