= Heath W. Lowry =

American historian

Heath Ward Lowry
- Born: 23 December 1942 (age 83); London, England, United Kingdom

Academic background
- Education: Portland State University (BA); UCLA (MA, PhD)
- Doctoral advisor: Stanford J. Shaw

Academic work
- Era: Ottoman Empire and Turkey
- Institutions: Boğaziçi University; Harvard University; Georgetown University; George P. Shultz National Foreign Affairs Training Center; Princeton University; Bahçeşehir University
- Main interests: History of Ottoman Empire, Oriental studies, Middle Eastern philosophy

Heath Ward Lowry (born 23 December 1942) is the Atatürk Professor of Ottoman and Modern Turkish Studies emeritus at Princeton University and Bahçeşehir University. He is an author of books about the history of the Ottoman Empire and Modern Turkey.

David B. MacDonald, of the Political Science department at the University of Guelph in Ontario, has labeled Lowry as one of the key deniers of the Armenian genocide. According to Israeli historian Yair Auron, Justin McCarthy with Heath Lowry, Bernard Lewis's successor in Princeton, leads the list of Armenian genocide deniers.

== Career ==
Lowry spent two years (1964–1966) working as a Peace Corps volunteer in a remote mountain village Bereketli, Balıkesir Province in western Turkey before graduating from Portland State University (1966). In the late '60s, he worked with scholars Speros Vryonis Jr., Andreas Tietze, Gustave von Grunebaum, and Stanford J. Shaw at the University of California Los Angeles, where he received both his master's degree (1970) and Ph.D. (1977).

Lowry was a founding member of the Department of History at the Boğaziçi University in İstanbul, Turkey, and taught there full-time from 1973 until 1980. In 1980, he co-founded The Journal of Ottoman Studies, together with Nejat Göyünç and Halil İnalcık. He also served as the Istanbul Director of the American Research Institute in Turkey from 1972 to 1979.

Lowry then took a position as Senior Research Associate at Harvard University's Dumbarton Oaks Research Library & Collection in Washington, D.C. between 1980 and 1983. There, he co-directed a team of international scholars working on late Byzantine and early Ottoman historical demography. In 1983, with a group of scholars, businessmen, and retired diplomats and a grant from the Turkish government, he helped establish, and became the director of, the Institute of Turkish Studies at Georgetown University, which until its closing in 2020 provided grants to scholars working in the area of Ottoman and Turkish studies. During this time, he began to study contemporary Turkish politics, and taught from 1989 to 1994 at the U.S. State Department's National Foreign Affairs Training Center in Arlington, Virginia, where his students were U.S. diplomats scheduled for assignment in Turkey. He served as Course Chairperson of the Advanced Area Studies Program on Turkey, Greece, and Cyprus.

From 1993 to 2013, Lowry was the Atatürk Professor of Ottoman and Modern Turkish Studies at Princeton University, and served as the director of the Near Eastern Studies program from July 1994 to June 1997. He offered seminars on early Ottoman history and undergraduate lecture courses on Ottoman history and contemporary Turkey. In 1996, Princeton was accused of allowing itself to be used by the Turkish government as a disseminator of propaganda when the university accepted a $750,000 donation from the government of Turkey and subsequently appointed Lowry, who denies the existence of the Turkish Armenian genocide in World War I.

In 2010, Lowry became a visiting professor at Bahçeşehir University in Turkey, where he directs the Center for Ottoman Era Studies. He is currently a professor emeritus at Princeton, and he simultaneously serves as an advisor to the chairman of the Bahçeşehir Board of Trustees.

== Academic disputes ==
In a 44-page long article published in the Journal of Ottoman Studies in 1986 (initially presented as a paper at a conference at MESA), Lowry wrote a review against historian Richard G. Hovannisian for his depiction of a junior American intelligence officer in his second volume on the history of the First Republic of Armenia. Though it only occupied the space of a single footnote in a 603-page book, Lowry thought the alleged mischaracterizations by Hovannisian to be so egregious as to have compromised his scholarly integrity. Lowry took issue with the favorable reviews of the book by other historians such as Firuz Kazemzadeh and Roderic Davison and charged Hovannisian with distorting facts and displaying partiality in his work. In a point-by-point rebuttal published in the same year, Hovannisian expressed surprise at Lowry's outrage and decision to single out the depiction of one individual and use it as the sole basis to discredit his research. He went on to criticize Lowry for exaggerating the scope of minor errors, misinterpreting the sources, and failing to grasp nuances found in the primary source material, which in many cases agreed with what he had originally written.

In 1990, Lowry claimed that Ambassador Morgenthau's Story was a record of "crude half-truths and outright falsehoods". According to Yair Auron, Lowry is recognized as a principal source discrediting Morgenthau, giving "impetus to the Turkish endeavor to deny the Armenian Genocide." Political scientist and Armenian genocide denier Guenter Lewy also shares Lowry's main conclusions about Morgenthau's memoirs. R.J. Rummel notes that Morgenthau's claims are consistent with many other sources of information, such as newsmen, other American diplomats, German diplomats and military personnel, Italian diplomats, other autobiographies, German and Turkish court testimony, Young Turk documents, reports of Turkish officials in the government, and refugees. Rummel concludes that he will "continue to give the Story credence until more neutral studies on it confirm Lowry's claim". According to Thomas de Waal, the evidence in the Ambassador Morgenthau's Story was so damning that some Armenian Genocide deniers, such as Lowry, have tried to disprove it, although much of the book's contents are verified by diplomatic cables and Morgenthau's access to the Ottoman leaders has been corroborated by other sources.

== Criticism ==
David B. MacDonald, of the Political Science department at the University of Guelph in Ontario, has labeled Lowry as one of the key deniers of the Armenian genocide. Samuel Totten and Steven Leonard Jacobs wrote that Lowry "helped to further Turkish propaganda". In 1985, Lowry was involved in organizing 69 academics to sign a letter expressing their opposition to official US recognition of the genocide. Many of these academics had been awarded financial grants by the Institute of Turkish Studies, which was directed by Lowry himself, in order to sign the letter.

=== Turkish ambassador incident ===
In 1990, psychologist Robert Jay Lifton received a letter from the Turkish Ambassador to the United States, Nüzhet Kandemir, questioning his inclusion of references to the Armenian genocide in one of his books. The ambassador inadvertently included a draft of a letter written by Lowry advising the ambassador on how to prevent mention of the Armenian genocide in scholarly works. Roger W. Smith, Eric Markusen and Lifton described his actions as a "subversion of scholarship". They also wrote that "Lowry's work contains many questionable assertions and conclusions", asserting that the conclusions "do not follow from his analysis or the evidence he can marshal". It has also been described "further proof of the Institute of Turkish Studies’ and scholars’ collusion with Turkish state interests". Lowry later apologized for writing the letter, saying that he "goofed."

=== Princeton appointment protests ===
In 1995, Lifton, Smith, and Markusen published an article criticizing Lowry's behavior in the academic journal Holocaust and Genocide Studies. In February of that year, a group of 100 scholars and writers published a denunciation the Turkish government and Lowry in The Chronicle of Higher Education. The signatories of the document included Alfred Kazin, Norman Mailer, Arthur Miller, Joyce Carol Oates, Susan Sontag, William Styron, David Riesman and John Updike.

The following year, Princeton University was publicly accused of accepting bribes to cater to Turkish propaganda, and multiple scholars protested Lowry's appointment to chair of the department. Peter Balakian, a professor at Colgate University, described Lowry's work as "evil euphemistic evasion," and organized a protest of 200 Armenian-Americans at the Princeton Club in New York City. The Princeton dean of faculty, Amy Gutmann, defended the university's actions by stating that donations do not influence the appointment process.

== Awards ==
Lowry received an honorary doctorate from the Boğaziçi University in 1985. In 1986, he was awarded the TÜTAV (Foundation for the Promotion and Recognition of Turkey) Prize. He was made a Corresponding Member of the Turkish Historical Society in 1988. From 2000 to 2001, Lowry was Senior Fulbright Research Scholar at Bilkent University, in Ankara, Turkey.

== Works ==
- "Early Ottoman Period," in Metin Heper and Sabri Sayari (ed.), The Routledge Handbook of Modern Turkey, London-New York: Routledge, 2012.
- In the footsteps of Evliyâ Çelebi, İstanbul: Bahçeşehir University Press, 2012.
- Clarence K. Streit's The Unknown Turks: Mustafa Kemal Paşa, Nationalist Ankara & Daily Life in Anatolia (January – March 1921). İstanbul: Bahçeşehir University Press, 2011.
- Remembering one's Roots. Mehmed Ali Paşa of Egypt's links to the Macedonian town of Kavala : architectural monuments, inscriptions & document, Istanbul-Kavala: Bahçeşehir University Press/Mohamed Ali Institute, 2011.
- The Evrenos Dynasty of Yenice-i Vardar: Notes & Documents. Istanbul: Bahçesehir University Publications, 2010.
- "The ‘Soup Muslims’ of the Ottoman Balkans: Was There a ‘Western’ & ‘Eastern’ Ottoman Empire?", Osmanlı Araştırmaları/Journal of Ottoman Studies, XXXVI (2010), pp. 95–131.
- In the Footsteps of the Ottomans: A Search for Sacred Spaces & Architectural Monuments in Northern Greece. Istanbul: Bahçesehir University Publications, 2009.
- An Ongoing Affair: Turkey & I, 2008. Istanbul & Eden (South Dakota): Çitlembik & Nettleberry, 2008.
- Defterology Revisited: Studies on 15th & 16th Century Ottoman Society, Istanbul: The Isis Press, 2008.
- The Shaping of the Ottoman Balkans, 1350–1550: Conquest, Settlement & Infrastructural Development of Northern Greece, Istanbul: Baçesehir University Publications, 2008.
- The Nature of the Early Ottoman State (SUNY Series in the Social and Economic History of the Middle East). Albany: SUNY Press, 2003. ISBN 0-7914-5635-8
- Ottoman Bursa in Travel Accounts. Bloomington: Indiana University Press (Ottoman and Modern Turkish Studies Publications), 2003. ISBN 1-878318-16-0
- Fifteenth Century Ottoman Realities: Christian Peasant Life on the Aegean Island of Limnos, Istanbul: Eren Press, 2002. ISBN 975-7622-89-3
- Humanist and scholar. Essays in honor of Andreas Tietze, [with: Donald Quataert et al.] Istanbul-Washington, The Isis Press/Institute of Turkish Studies, 1993. ISBN 0-941469-02-6
- Studies in Defterology: Ottoman Society in the Fifteenth and Sixteenth Century Istanbul, Istanbul: Isis Press, 1992. ISBN 975-428-046-0
- The Story Behind ‘Ambassador Morgenthau's Story’, Istanbul (Isis Press), 1990. ISBN 975-428-019-3. Translated into French, German and Turkish.
- "The Turkish History: on What Sources Will it be Based? A Case Study on the Burning of Izmir", The Journal of Ottoman Studies, Volume VIII (1989), pp. 1–29.
- "Halide Edip Hanim in Ankara: April 2, 1920 – August 16, 1921", I. Uluslarasi Atatürk Sempozyumu, Ankara, 1987, pp. 691–710.
- Continuity and Change in Late Byzantine and Early Ottoman Society [with: A. Bryer et al.] Cambridge, MA & Birmingham, England: Dumbarton Oaks & University of Birmingham, 1985. ISBN 0-7044-0748-5
- "Richard G. Hovannisian on Lieutenant Robert Steed Dunn", The Journal of Ottoman Studies, Volume V (1985), pp. 209–252.
- "The U.S. Congress and Adolf Hitler on the Armenians", Political Communication and Persuasion, Volume 3, Number 2 (1985).
- "Nineteenth and Twentieth Century Armenian Terrorism: 'Threads of Continuity'," International Terrorism and the Drug Connection, Ankara: Ankara University Press, 1984, pp. 71–83.
- "American Observers in Anatolia ca 1920: The Bristol Papers", in Boğaziçi University (ed.), Armenians in the Ottoman Empire and Modern Turkey (1912-1926), Istanbul: Tasvir Press, 1984, pp. 42–58.
- The Islamization and Turkification of Trabzon, 1461-1483. Istanbul (Boğaziçi University Press), 1981 & 1999. ISBN 0-87850-102-9
