= Blue Book (Bryce and Toynbee book) =

Report commissioned by the British Parliament

The Treatment of Armenians in the Ottoman Empire
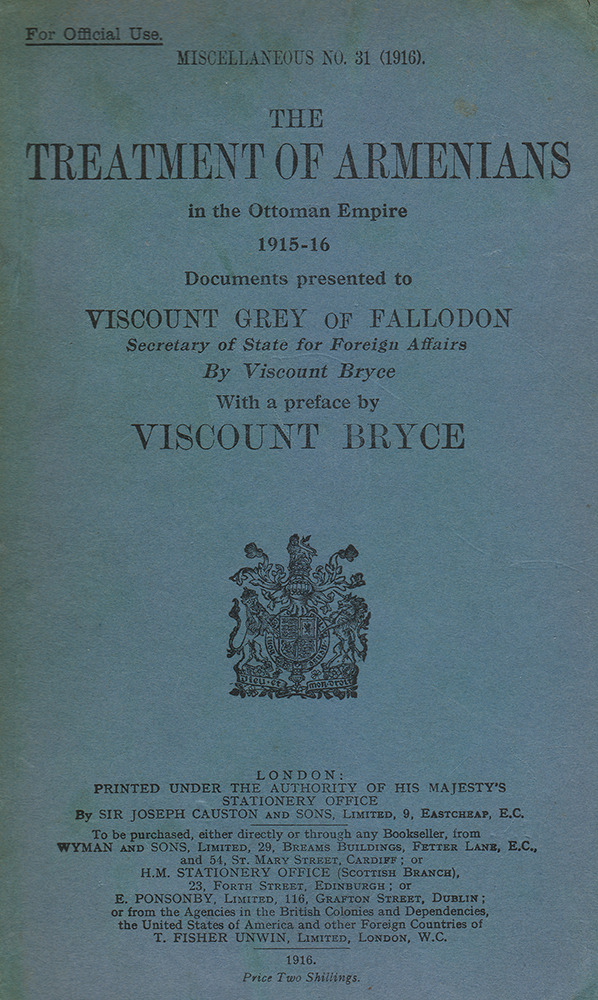
- Author: Arnold Joseph Toynbee
- Original title: The Treatment of Armenians in the Ottoman Empire: Documents presented to Viscount Grey of Fallodon
- Language: English
- Subject: History
- Publisher: Sir Joseph Causton and Sons Ltd.
- Publication date: 1916
- Publication place: England, UK
- Media type: Print (Hardcover)
- Pages: 742
- Text: The Treatment of Armenians in the Ottoman Empire online

The Blue Book, officially titled The Treatment of Armenians in the Ottoman Empire 1915–1916, was an official report commissioned by the British Parliament and presented in 1916 by Viscount Bryce and Arnold J. Toynbee. The 742-page volume is a compilation of over 100 sources that chronicled the early period of the Armenian genocide and the Assyrian genocide in the Ottoman Empire.

== Contents ==
Commissioned by the British Government and issued as an official Parliamentary "Blue Book" report in October 1916, the volume is divided regionally into twenty sections, each of which contains multiple eyewitness and secondhand reports, dispatches, news articles, and letters. In total there were 149 documents and 15 appendixes. The publication presents Arnold J. Toynbee's analysis of the population in the Ottoman Empire. The presented table and map show the re-calculated values of the stated provinces using values where Armenians were the majority of the population, according to Toynbee's estimates. The book was subsequently published in 1916 by Hodder and Stoughton.

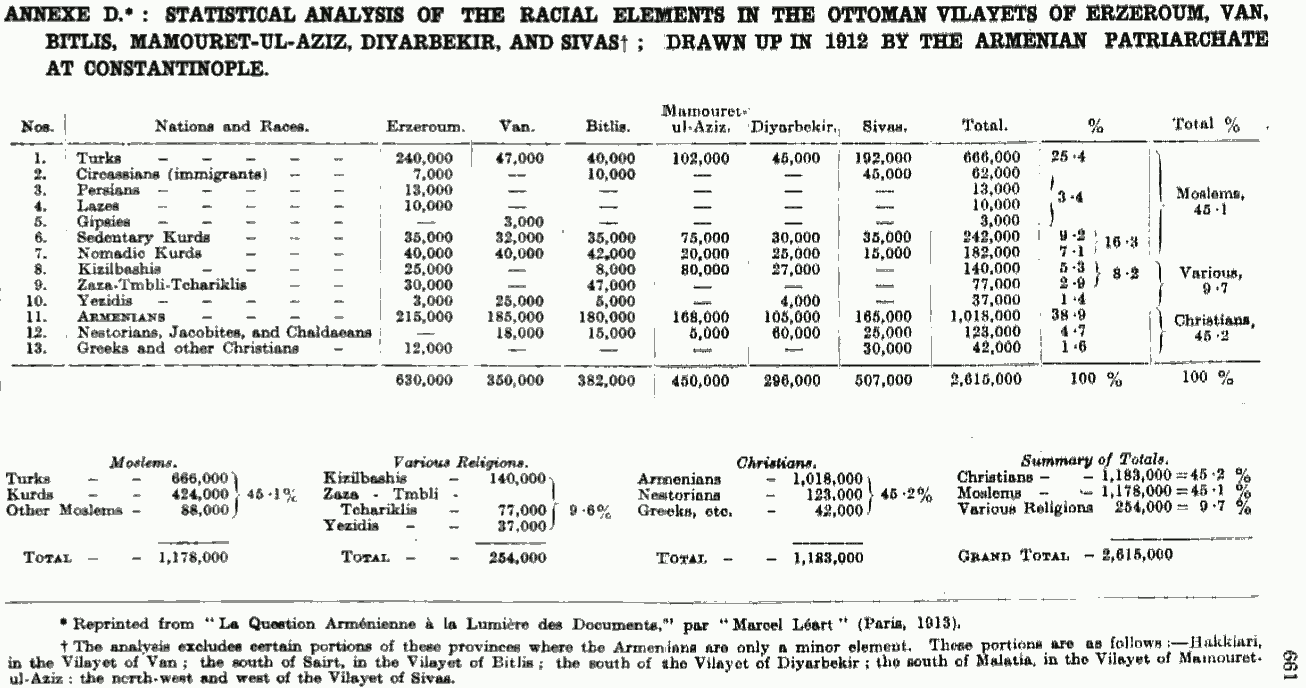
Ethnic values of six vilayets according to presented data

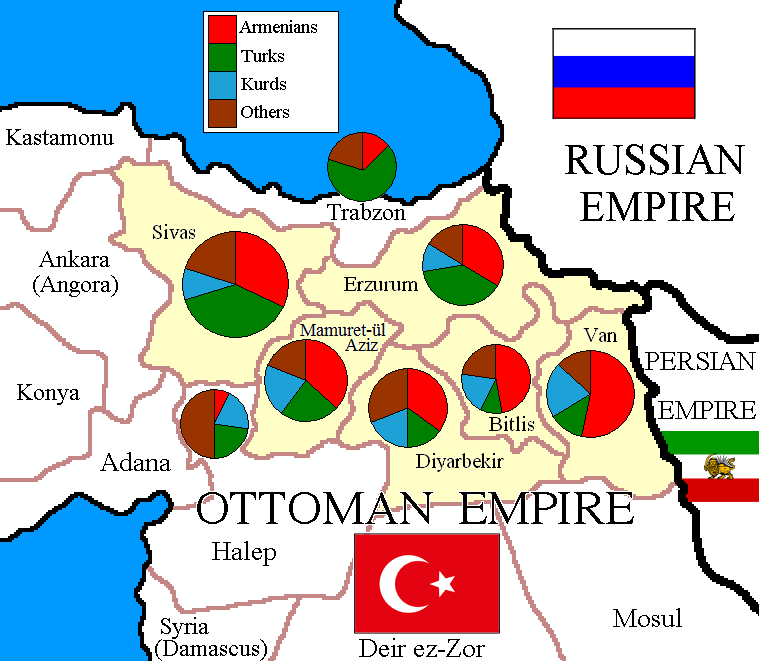
Ethnic map of six vilayets according to presented data

== Reception ==
Although the book has been criticized by some Turkish denialists as propaganda to build up support for the war, Bryce submitted the work to scholars for verification before its publication. Oxford professor Gilbert Murray stated of the tome, "...the evidence of these letters and reports will bear any scrutiny and overpower any skepticism. Their genuineness is established beyond question." Other professors, including Herbert Fisher of Sheffield University and former American Bar Association president Moorfield Storey, affirmed the same conclusion.

In 2005, the Turkish National Assembly demanded an apology for the publication of the book.

== See also ==
- The Blue Book, Political Truth or Historical Fact, a 2009 documentary film in support of the authenticity of the report
- Armenians in the Ottoman Empire
- Press coverage during the Armenian Genocide

== Online copy ==
- Online copy of entire report on Archive.org
