= 100 Years Later =

2016 film

- Directed by: John Lubbock
- Written by: John Lubbock
- Produced by: John Lubbock
- Cinematography: Craig Jones
- Music by: Sheriff Musa, Collectif Medz Bazar Band
- Distributed by: John Lubbock Films
- Release date: 27 January 2016
- Running time: 55 minutes
- Languages: English, Armenian, Turkish, Kurdish

100 Years Later is a 2016 British documentary film directed, written, and produced by John Lubbock. The film follows the work of historian Ara Sarafian, executive director of the Gomidas Institute in London, in his efforts to create dialogue in Turkey among Armenians, Kurds, and Turks on the occasion of the 100th anniversary of the Armenian genocide on 24 April 2015. The film includes appearances by Selahattin Demirtaş and İsmail Beşikçi.
