= Donald Quataert =

American historian

Donald George Quataert (September 10, 1941 – February 10, 2011) was an American historian of the Ottoman Empire and Professor of History at Binghamton University. He was one of the leading scholars of Ottoman social, economic, and labor history, whose work helped transform the field by shifting attention from high politics and diplomacy toward the study of workers, artisans, provincial society, manufacturing, and everyday economic life. He also trained generations of graduate students in the use of Ottoman archival sources.

== Early life and education ==
Quataert received his bachelor's degree from Boston University in 1966, graduating Phi Beta Kappa. He earned his master's degree from Harvard University in 1968 and completed his Ph.D. at University of California, Los Angeles in 1973.

== Academic career ==
Quataert spent most of his academic career at Binghamton University, where he taught Ottoman and Middle Eastern history from the early modern through the modern periods.

Quataert served as editor of the International Journal of Middle East Studies and held numerous leadership positions within the field of Middle Eastern and Ottoman studies. From 2001 until 2006, he served as chairman of the board of directors of the Institute of Turkish Studies.

== Scholarship ==
Among his best-known publications are Social Disintegration and Popular Resistance in the Ottoman Empire, 1881–1908 (1983), Ottoman Manufacturing in the Age of the Industrial Revolution (1993), The Ottoman Empire, 1700–1922 (2000), and the edited volume Consumption Studies and the History of the Ottoman Empire, 1550–1922 (2000).

In 2006, Quataert published a review essay of Donald Bloxham's The Great Game of Genocide, in which he stated that he used the term genocide to describe the Armenian genocide, arguing that "to do otherwise... runs the risk of suggesting denial of the massive and systematic atrocities" and that accumulating evidence indicated central planning by Ottoman government officials.

Following publication of the essay, Quataert resigned as chairman of the board of directors of the Institute of Turkish Studies. He stated that his resignation resulted from pressure exerted by Turkish officials, including Ambassador Nabi Şensoy. Several other board members subsequently resigned in protest. The incident prompted criticism from the Middle East Studies Association, whose leadership argued that political pressure on academic institutions was incompatible with the principles of academic freedom.

== Books ==
- The Ottoman Empire, 1700-1922, Cambridge University Press, 2000.
- Ottoman Manufacturing in the Age of the Industrial Revolution, Cambridge University Press, 2002.
- Miners and the State in the Ottoman Empire: The Zonguldak Coalfield, 1822-1920, Berghahn Books, 2006.

== See also ==
- Armenian genocide denial
