= Speros Vryonis =

American historian (1928–2019)

- Σπυρίδων "Σπύρος" Βρυώνης
- Born: July 18, 1928; Memphis, Tennessee
- Died: March 11, 2019 (aged 90); Sacramento, California

Academic background
- Education: Harvard University

Academic work
- Main interests: Byzantine, Balkan, and Greek history

Signature
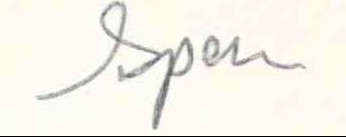

Speros Vryonis Jr. (Greek: Σπυρίδων "Σπύρος" Βρυώνης, July 18, 1928 – March 12, 2019) was an American historian of Greek descent and a specialist in Byzantine, Balkan, and Greek history.

He was the author of a number of works on Byzantine and Greek-Turkish relations, including his seminal The Decline of Medieval Hellenism in Asia Minor (1971) and The Mechanism of Catastrophe (2005).

Vryonis attained his Bachelor of Arts in ancient history and the classics from Southwestern College (now Rhodes College) in Memphis, Tennessee, in 1950. He received his Masters of Arts from Harvard University two years later and his Ph.D. from the same school in 1956. Vryonis carried out his post-doctoral research at Dumbarton Oaks before joining the history faculty at the University of California, Los Angeles in the mid-1960s, where he served as the director of the G. E. von Grunebaum Center for Near Eastern Studies. In 1987 he was tapped to head the Alexander S. Onassis for Hellenic Studies at New York University.

Vryonis was the former director of the Speros Basil Vryonis Center for the Study of Hellenism. He was the AHIF Senior Fellow for Hellenism and for Greek and Turkish Studies. He was a member of both the American Philosophical Society and the American Academy of Arts and Sciences.

A two-volume festschrift was published in his honor in 1993.

He resided in northern California until his death on March 11, 2019, in Sacramento.

== Books (author) ==
- Byzantium and Europe New York: Harcourt, Brace & World, 1968.
- The Decline of Medieval Hellenism in Asia Minor and the Process of Islamization from the Eleventh through the Fifteenth Century. Berkeley: University of California Press, 1971.
- A brief history of the Greek-American community of St. George, Memphis, Tennessee, 1962-1982. Malibu, CA: Undena Publications, 1982.
- The Turkish state and history: Clio meets the Grey Wolf. Thessaloniki, Greece : Institute for Balkan Studies, 1993.
- The Vryonis family : four generations of Greek-American memories. Bundoora, Victoria, Australia: National Centre for Hellenic Studies and Research, La Trobe University, 2000.
- The Mechanism of Catastrophe: The Turkish Pogrom of September 6–7, 1955, and the Destruction of the Greek Community of Istanbul. New York: Greekworks.com, 2005.

== Books (editor) ==
- Greece on the road to democracy : from the Junta to Pasok 1974-1986. New Rochelle, N.Y.: Aristide D. Caratzas, 1991.
- Byzantine studies : essays on the Slavic world and on the eleventh century. New Rochelle : A.D. Caratzas, 1992.
- The Greeks and the sea. New Rochelle, N.Y. : Aristide D. Caratzas, 1993.

== Articles ==
- "Isidore Glabas and the Turkish Devshirme," Speculum 31 (July 1956), pp. 433–443.
- “The Will of a Provincial Magnate, Eustathius Boilas (1059).” Dumbarton Oaks Papers, vol. 11, JSTOR, 1957, pp. 263–77, doi:10.2307/1291111.
- “The Question of the Byzantine Mines.” Speculum, vol. 37, no. 1, Cambridge University Press, Jan. 1962, pp. 1–17, doi:10.2307/2850595.
- "The Byzantine Legacy and Ottoman Forms," Dumbarton Oaks Papers 23/24 (1969/1970), pp. 251–308.
- “Evidence On Human Sacrifice Among the Early Ottoman Turks.” Journal of Asian History, vol. 5, no. 2, Otto Harrassowitz, Jan. 1971, pp. 140–46.
- “Nomadization and Islamization in Asia Minor.” Dumbarton Oaks Papers, vol. 29, Dumbarton Oaks Center for Byzantine Studies, Jan. 1975, pp. 41–71, doi:10.2307/1291369.
- “Laonicus Chalcocondyles and the Ottoman Budget.” International Journal of Middle East Studies, vol. 7, no. 3, Cambridge University Press, July 1976, pp. 423–32, doi:10.1017/S0020743800025733.
- “The Evolution of Slavic Society and the Slavic Invasions in Greece. The First Major Slavic Attack on Thessaloniki, A. D. 597.” Hesperia: The Journal of the American School of Classical Studies at Athens, vol. 50, no. 4, American School of Classical Studies at Athens, Oct. 1981, pp. 378–90, JSTOR 147879.
- "Cultural Context of Preserving Community Archives." Greek Orthodox Theological Review, vol. 45, no. 1, 2000, pp. 363–376. ProQuest 220261232
- “Byzantium: The Social Basis of Decline in the Eleventh Century.” Greek, Roman and Byzantine Studies, vol. 2, no. 2, Duke University, Sept. 2001, pp. 157–75.
- “Byzantine Attitudes Toward Islam During the Late Middle Ages.” Greek, Roman and Byzantine Studies, vol. 12, no. 2, Duke University, July 2003, pp. 263–86.
