= Nabi Şensoy =

Turkish diplomat

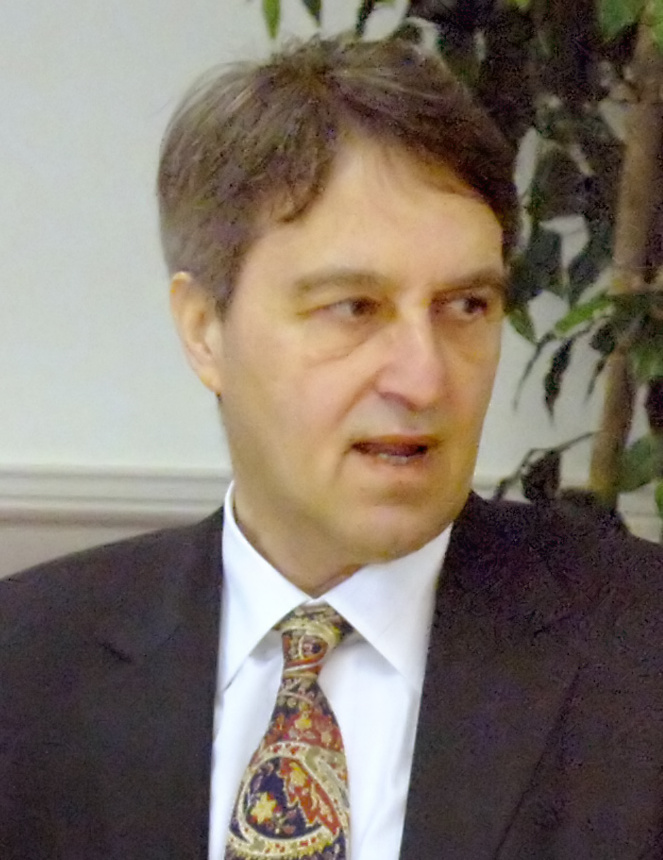
- Şensoy in 2007

Personal details
- Born: 25 May 1945 Istanbul, Turkey
- Died: 6 February 2018 (aged 72) İzmir, Turkey
- Education: English High School for Boys
- Alma mater: Faculty of Political Science, Ankara University

Nabi Sensoy (25 May 1945 in Istanbul – 7 February 2018 in İzmir, Turkey) was the ambassador of Turkey to the United States from January 2006. He was recalled to Turkey in October 2007 after the United States House Committee on Foreign Affairs passed a resolution condemning the Armenian genocide in the Ottoman Empire. He returned to his position shortly afterwards. He resigned in December 2009.

== See also ==
- List of Turkish diplomats
