= Hilmar Kaiser =

German historian

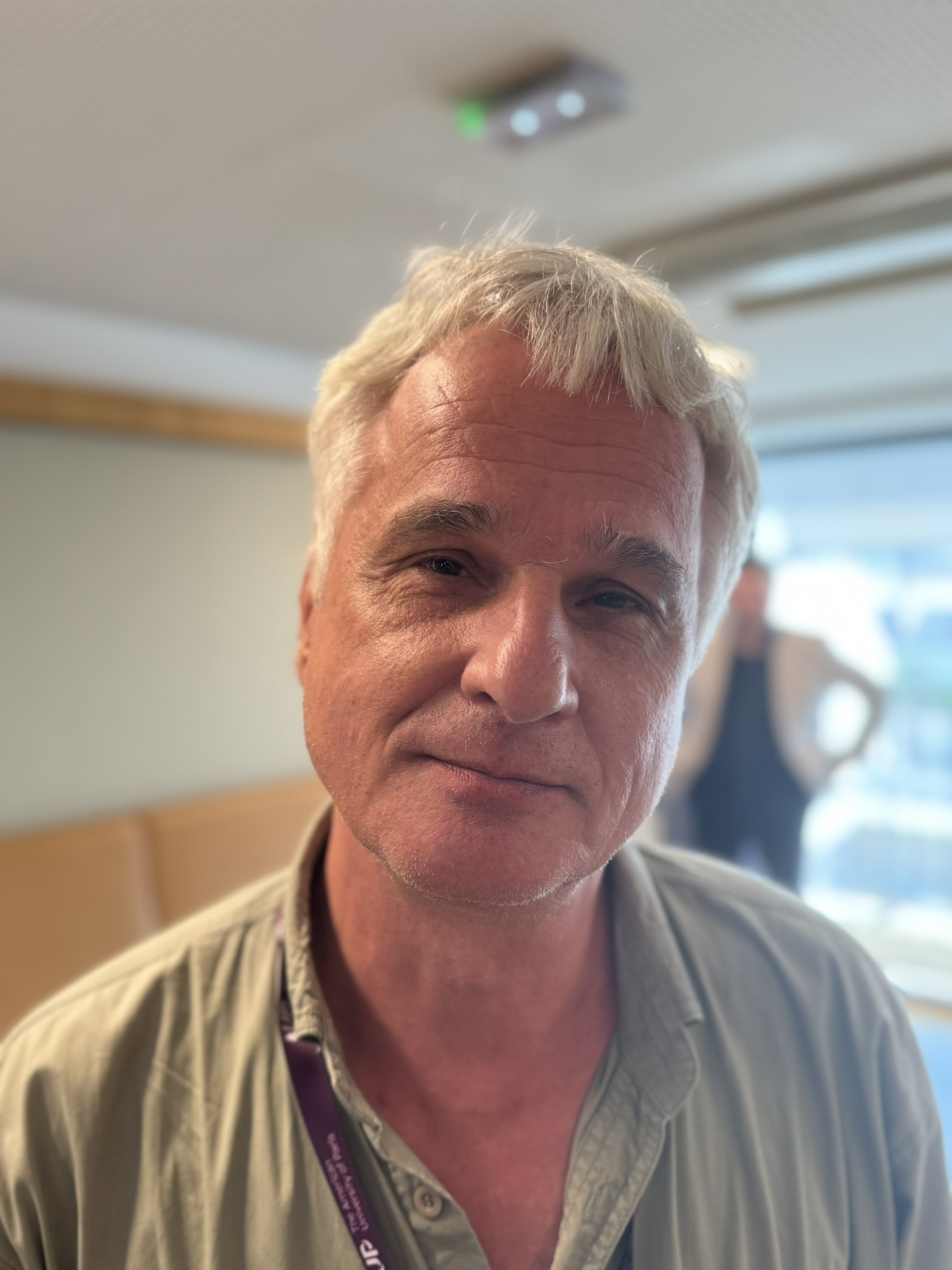
- Born: 1962 (age 63–64); Germany
- Occupation: Historian

Hilmar Kaiser is a German historian who has a PhD from European University Institute, Florence.

== Works ==
- Kaiser, Hilmar (1997). Imperialism, Racism, and Development Theories: The Construction of a Dominant Paradigm on Ottoman Armenians. Gomidas Institute. ISBN 978-1-884630-02-6.
- Eskijian, Luther; Kaiser, Hilmar; Eskijian, Nancy (2001). At the Crossroads of Der Zor: Death, Survival, and Humanitarian Resistance in Aleppo, 1915-1917. Signalman Publishing. ISBN 978-1-940145-72-3.
- Kaiser, Hilmar (2014). The Extermination of Armenians in the Diarbekir Region. İstanbul Bilgi University Press. ISBN 978-605-399-333-9.
