= Ali Kemal Meram =

Turkish historian

Ali Kemal Meram (1914–2001) was a Turkish historian, novelist and poet. He was born in Istanbul, and graduated from the Istanbul University Faculty of Literature. He began his career as a journalist and teacher. He authored 28 books, including history books, novels, short stories, and poems. His first book was a poem collection published in 1936. His history works include studies on Turkish history, the Ottoman Empire, Göktürks, and Turkish identity.

== Works ==
- Padişah anaları: resimli belgesel tarih romanı (1977), history
  - Padisah Analari: ve 600 Yil Bizi Yöneten Devsirmeler (2011), history
- Göktürk Imparatorluğu (1974), history
- Türk casusu İngiliz Kemal'in İsrail macerası (1973), history
- Kader rüzgârlari: Hikâyeler (1970), short stories
- Siyah kapli defter: Dört liseli kizin romani (1970), history
- Türkçülük ve Türkçülük mücadeleleri tarihi (1969), history
- Türk-Rus ilişkileri tarihi (1969), history
- Ilk Türk Devleti ve Yazili Türk Anitlari (1968), history
- Ismet Inonu ve Ikinci Cihan Harbi: bu harpte Turk siyaseti (1945), history
