= Armenian genocide denial =

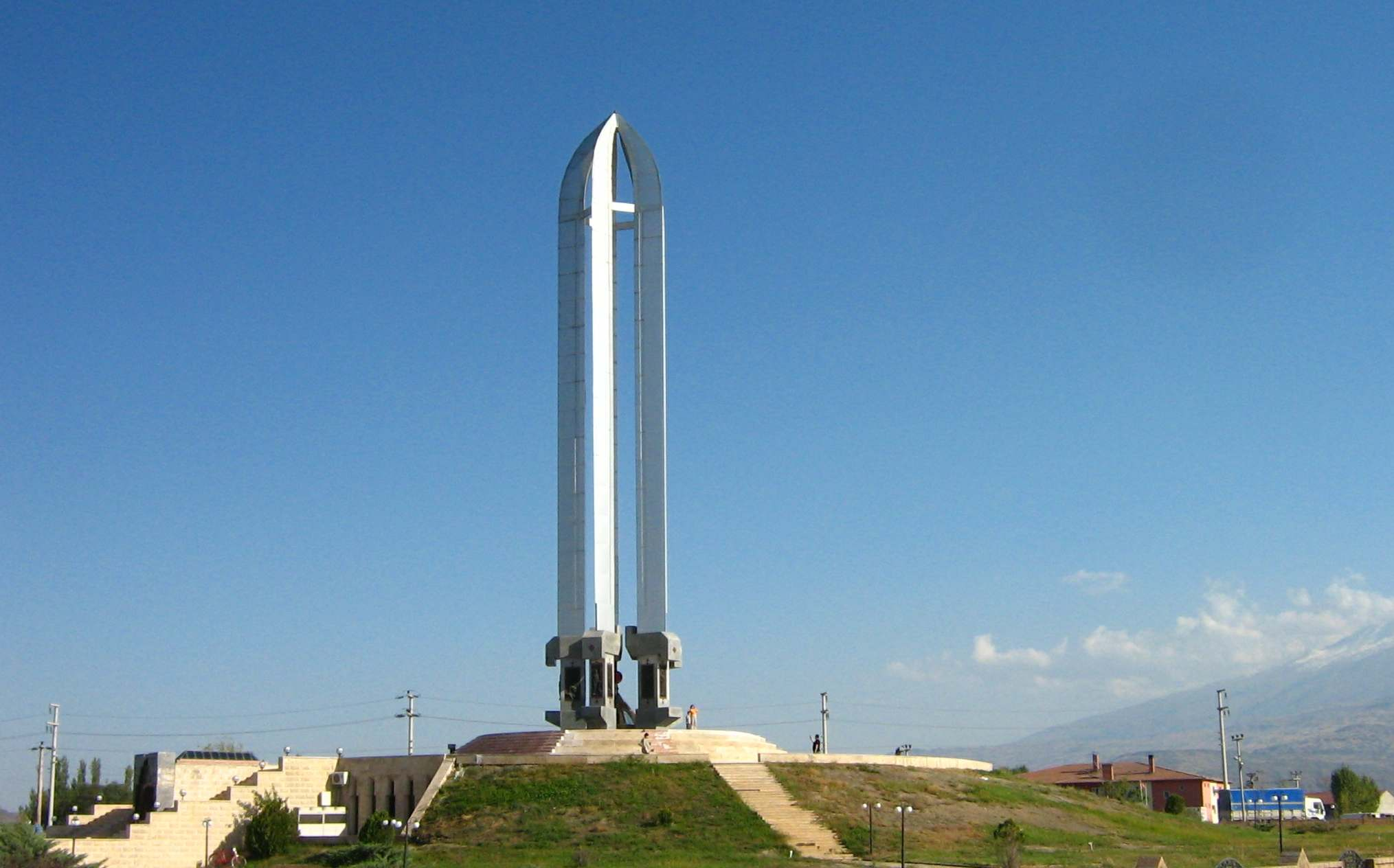
The Iğdır Genocide Memorial and Museum promotes the false view that Armenians committed genocide against Turks, rather than vice versa.

Armenian genocide denial is the negationist claim that the Ottoman Empire and its ruling party, the Committee of Union and Progress (CUP), did not commit genocide against its Armenian citizens during World War I—a crime documented in a large body of evidence and affirmed by the vast majority of scholars. The perpetrators denied the genocide as they carried it out, claiming that Armenians in the Ottoman Empire were resettled for military reasons, not exterminated. In its aftermath, incriminating documents were systematically destroyed. Since the 1920s, denial has been the policy of every government of the Ottoman Empire's successor state, the Republic of Turkey.

Borrowing arguments used by the CUP to justify its actions, Armenian genocide denial rests on the notion that the deportation of Armenians was a legitimate state action in response to an alleged Armenian uprising that threatened the empire's existence during wartime. Deniers assert that the CUP intended to resettle Armenians, not kill them. They claim the death toll is exaggerated or attribute the deaths to other factors, such as a purported civil war, disease, bad weather, rogue local officials, or bands of Kurds and outlaws. The historian Ronald Grigor Suny summarizes the main argument as: "There was no genocide, and the Armenians were to blame for it."

A critical reason for denial is that the genocide enabled the establishment of a Turkish nation-state; recognizing it would contradict Turkey's founding myths. Since the 1920s, Turkey has worked to prevent recognition or even mention of the genocide in other countries. It has spent millions of dollars on lobbying, created research institutes, and used intimidation and threats. Denial, according to Donald Bloxham, is usually accompanied by "rhetoric of Armenian treachery, aggression, criminality, and territorial ambition". Denial affects Turkey's domestic policies and is taught in Turkish schools; some Turkish citizens who recognize the genocide have faced prosecution for "insulting Turkishness". Turkey's century-long effort to deny the genocide sets it apart from other historical cases of genocide.

Azerbaijan, a close ally of Turkey, also denies the genocide and campaigns against its recognition internationally. Most Turkish citizens and political parties support Turkey's denial policy. Scholars argue that Armenian genocide denial has set the tone for the government's attitude towards minorities, and has contributed to the ongoing violence against Kurds in Turkey. A 2014 poll of 1,500 people conducted by EDAM, a Turkish think tank, found that nine percent of Turkish citizens recognize the genocide.

== Background ==
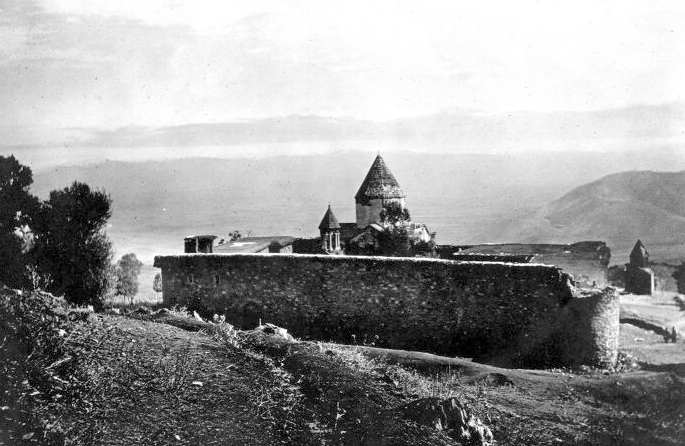
Arakelots Monastery, built in the 4th century, looted in 1915, later destroyed

The presence of Armenians in Anatolia is documented since the sixth century BC, almost two millennia before Turkish presence in the area. The Ottoman Empire effectively treated Armenians and other non-Muslims as second-class citizens under Islamic rule, even after the nineteenth-century Tanzimat reforms intended to equalize their status. By the 1890s, Armenians faced forced conversions to Islam and increasing land seizures, which led a handful to join revolutionary parties such as the Armenian Revolutionary Federation (ARF, also known as Dashnaktsutyun). In the mid-1890s, state-sponsored Hamidian massacres killed at least 100,000 Armenians, and in 1909, the authorities failed to prevent the Adana massacre, which resulted in the death of some 17,000 Armenians. The Ottoman authorities denied any responsibility for these massacres, accusing Western powers of meddling and Armenians of provocation, while presenting Muslims as the main victims and failing to punish the perpetrators. These same tropes of denial would be employed later to deny the Armenian genocide.

The Committee of Union and Progress (CUP) came to power in two coups in 1908 and in 1913. In the meantime, the Ottoman Empire lost almost all of its European territory in the Balkan Wars; the CUP blamed Christian treachery for this defeat. Hundreds of thousands of Muslim refugees fled to Anatolia as a result of the wars; many were resettled in the Armenian-populated eastern provinces and harbored resentment against Christians. In August 1914, CUP representatives appeared at an ARF conference demanding that in the event of war with the Russian Empire, the ARF incite Russian Armenians to intervene on the Ottoman side. The ARF declined, instead declaring that Armenians should fight for the countries in which they were citizens. In October 1914, the Ottoman Empire entered World War I on the side of the Central Powers.

=== Armenian genocide ===
Map of the Armenian genocide in 1915

During the Ottoman invasion of Russian and Persian territory in late 1914, Ottoman paramilitaries massacred local Armenians. A few Ottoman Armenian soldiers defected to Russia—seized upon by both the CUP and later deniers as evidence of Armenian treachery—but the Armenian volunteers in the Russian army were mostly Russian Armenians. Massacres turned into genocide following the catastrophic Ottoman defeat by Russia in the Battle of Sarikamish (January 1915), which was blamed on Armenian treachery. Armenian soldiers and officers were removed from their posts pursuant to a 25 February order issued by Minister of War Enver Pasha. In the minds of the Ottoman leaders, isolated incidents of Armenian resistance were taken as evidence of a general insurrection.

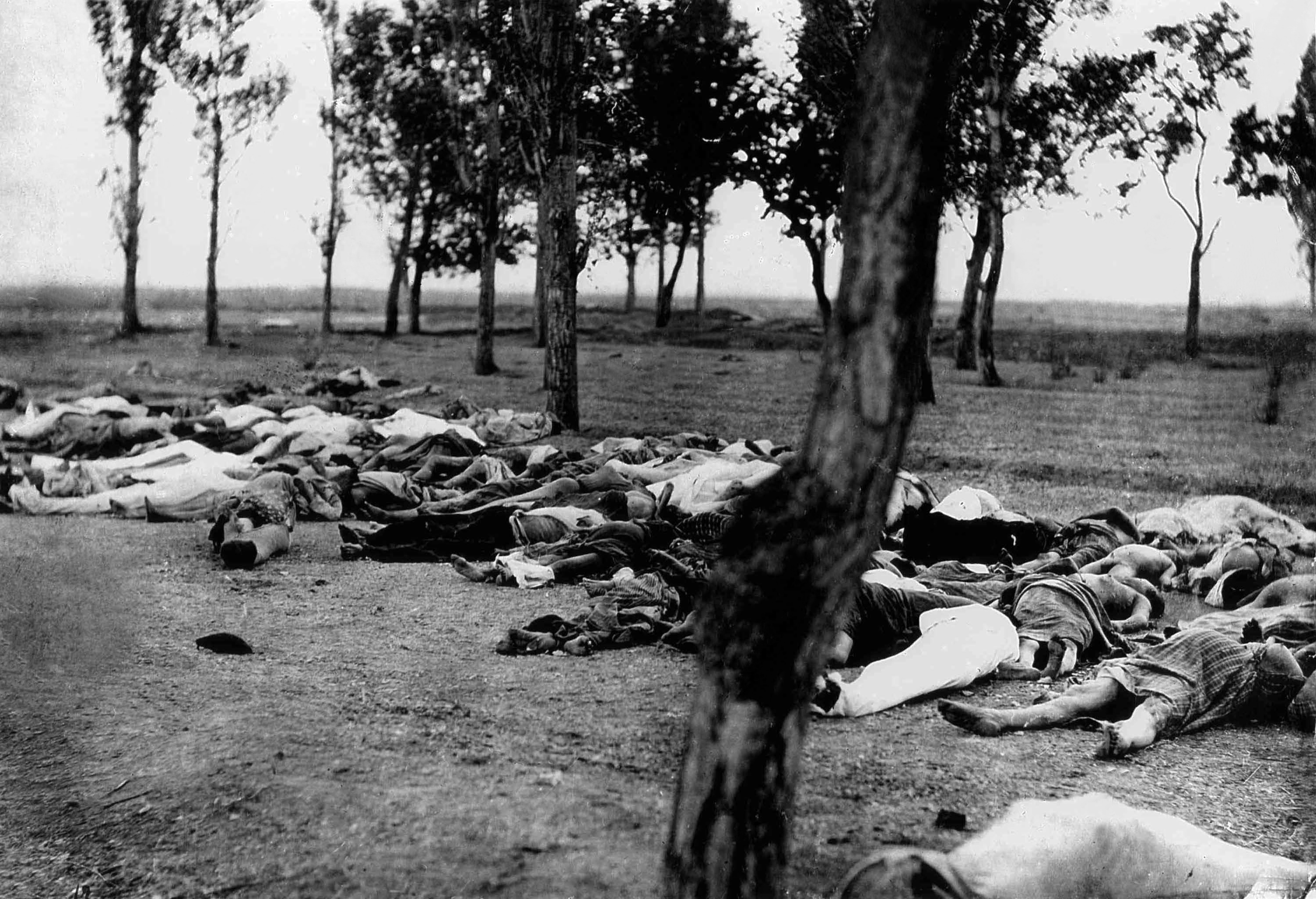
The corpses of Armenians beside a road, a common sight along deportation routes

In mid-April, after Ottoman leaders had decided to commit genocide, Armenians barricaded themselves in the eastern city of Van. The defense of Van served as a pretext for anti-Armenian actions at the time and remains a crucial element in works that seek to deny or justify the genocide. On 24 April, hundreds of Armenian intellectuals were arrested in Constantinople. Systematic deportation of Armenians began, given a cover of legitimacy by the 27 May deportation law. The Special Organization guarded the deportation convoys consisting mostly of women, children, and the elderly who were subject to systematic rape and massacres. Their destination was the Syrian Desert, where those who survived the death marches were left to die of starvation or disease in makeshift camps. Deportation was only carried out in the areas away from active fighting; near the front lines, Armenians were massacred outright. The leaders of the CUP ordered the deportations, with interior minister Talat Pasha, aware that he was sending the Armenians to their deaths, taking a leading role. In a cable dated 13 July 1915, Talat stated that "the aim of the Armenian deportations is the final solution of the Armenian Question."

Historians estimate that 1.5 to 2 million Armenians lived in the Ottoman Empire in 1915, of whom 800,000 to 1.2 million were deported during the genocide. In 1916, a wave of massacres targeted the surviving Armenians in Syria; by the end of the year, only 200,000 were still alive. An estimated 100,000 to 200,000 women and children were integrated into Muslim families through such methods as forced marriage, adoption and conversion. The state confiscated and redistributed property belonging to murdered or deported Armenians. During the Russian occupation of eastern Anatolia, Russian and Armenian forces massacred as many as 60,000 Muslims. Making a false equivalence between these killings and the genocide is a central argument of denial.

The genocide is documented extensively in Ottoman archives, documents collected by foreign diplomats (including those from neutral countries and Ottoman allies), eyewitness reports by Armenian survivors and Western missionaries, and the proceedings of the Ottoman Special Military Tribunals. Talat Pasha kept his own statistical record, which revealed a massive discrepancy between the number of Armenians deported in 1915 and those surviving in 1917. The vast majority of non-Turkish scholars accept the genocide as a historical fact, and an increasing number of Turkish historians are also acknowledging and studying the genocide.

== Origins ==
=== Ottoman Empire ===
Genocide denial is the minimization of an event established as genocide, either by denying the facts or by denying the intent of the perpetrators. Denial was present from the outset as an integral part of the Armenian genocide, which was perpetrated under the guise of resettlement. Denial emerged because of the Ottoman desire to maintain American neutrality in the war and German financial and military support.

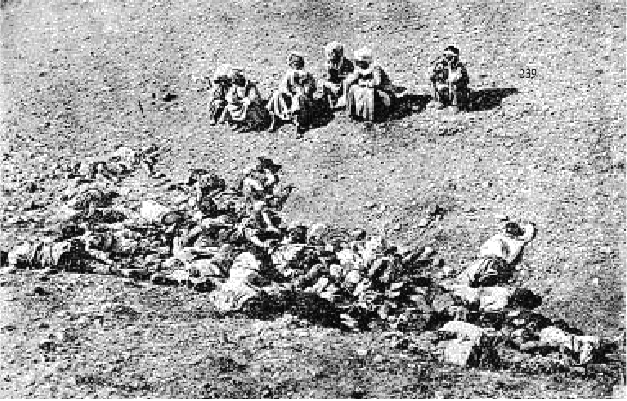
In the 1916 book The Armenian Aspirations and Revolutionary Movements, many photographs claimed to depict Armenian atrocities against Muslims, such as this one, were published.

In May 1915, Russia, Britain, and France sent a diplomatic communiqué to the Ottoman government condemning the Ottoman "crimes against humanity" and threatening to hold accountable any Ottoman officials who were responsible. The Ottoman government denied that massacres of Armenians had occurred, and said that Armenians colluded with the enemy, while asserting that national sovereignty allowed them to take measures against the Armenians. It also alleged that Armenians had massacred Muslims and accused the Allies of committing war crimes.

In early 1916, the Ottoman government published a two-volume work titled The Armenian Aspirations and Revolutionary Movements, denying it had tried to exterminate the Armenian people. At the time, little credence was given to such statements internationally, but some Muslims, previously ashamed by crimes against Armenians, changed their mind in response to propaganda about atrocities allegedly committed by Armenians. The themes of genocide denial that originated during the war were later recycled in Turkey's denial of the genocide.

=== Turkish nationalist movement ===
The Armenian genocide itself played a key role in the destruction of the Ottoman Empire and the foundation of the Turkish republic. The destruction of the Christian middle class, and redistribution of their properties, enabled the creation of a new Muslim/Turkish bourgeoisie. There was significant continuity between the Ottoman Empire and Republic of Turkey, and the Republican People's Party was the successor of the Committee of Union and Progress that carried out the genocide. The Turkish nationalist movement depended on support from those who had perpetrated the genocide or enriched themselves from it, creating an incentive for silence. Denial and minimization of wartime atrocities was crucial to the formation of a Turkish nationalist consensus.

Following the genocide, many survivors sought an Armenian state in eastern Anatolia; warfare between Turkish nationalists and Armenians was fierce, atrocities being committed on both sides. Later political demands and Armenian killings of Muslims have often been used to retroactively justify the 1915 genocide. The Treaty of Sèvres granted Armenians a large territory in eastern Anatolia, but this provision was never implemented because of the Turkish invasion of Armenia in 1920. Turkish troops conducted massacres of Armenian survivors in Cilicia and killed around 200,000 Armenians following the invasion of the Caucasus and the First Republic of Armenia; thus, historian Rouben Paul Adalian has argued that "Mustafa Kemal [the leader of the Turkish nationalist movement] completed what Talaat and Enver had started in 1915."

The Ottoman government in Constantinople held courts-martial of a handful of perpetrators in 1919 to appease Western powers. Even so, the evidence was sabotaged, and many perpetrators were encouraged to escape to the interior. The reality of state-sponsored mass killing was not denied, but many circles of society considered it necessary and justified. As a British Foreign Office report stated, "not one Turk in a thousand can conceive that there might be a Turk who deserves to be hanged for the killing of Christians." Kemal repeatedly accused Armenians of plotting the extermination of Muslims in Anatolia. He contrasted the "murderous Armenians" to Turks, portrayed as a completely innocent and oppressed nation. In 1919, Kemal defended the Ottoman government's policies towards Christians, saying "Whatever has befallen the non-Muslim elements living in our country, is the result of the policies of separatism they pursued in a savage manner, when they allowed themselves to be made tools of foreign intrigues and abused their privileges."

== In Turkey ==
=== Causes ===
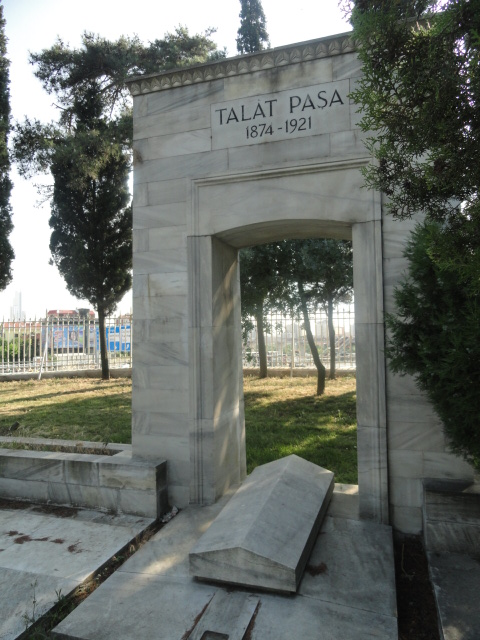
Talat Pasha, the architect of the genocide, was buried in 1943 at the Monument of Liberty, Istanbul, as a national hero.

Historian Erik-Jan Zürcher argues that, since the Turkish nationalist movement depended on the support of a broad coalition of actors that benefitted from the genocide, it was impossible to break with the past. From the founding of the republic, the genocide has been viewed as a necessity and raison d'état. Many of the main perpetrators, including Talat Pasha, were hailed as national heroes of Turkey; many schools, streets, and mosques are still named after them. Those convicted and sentenced to death by the postwar tribunal for crimes against Armenians, such as Mehmet Kemal and Behramzade Nusret, were proclaimed national and glorious martyrs and their families were rewarded by the state with confiscated Armenian properties. Turkish historian Taner Akçam states that, "It's not easy for a nation to call its founding fathers murderers and thieves." Kieser and other historians argue that "the single most important reason for this inability to accept culpability is the centrality of the Armenian massacres for the formation of the Turkish nation-state." Turkish historian Doğan Gürpınar says that acknowledging the genocide would bring into question the foundational assumptions of the Turkish nation-state.

One factor in explaining denial is Sèvres syndrome, a popular belief that Turkey is besieged by implacable enemies. Despite the unlikelihood that recognition would lead to any territorial changes, many Turkish officials believe that genocide recognition is part of a plot to partition Turkey or extract other reparations. Acknowledgement of the genocide is perceived by the state as a threat to Turkey's national security, and Turks who do so are seen as traitors. During his fieldwork in an Anatolian village in the 1980s, anthropologist Sam Kaplan found that "a visceral fear of Armenians returning ... and reclaiming their lands still gripped local imagination".

=== Destruction and concealment of evidence ===
An edict of the Ottoman government banned foreigners from taking photographs of Armenian refugees or the corpses that accumulated on the sides of the roads on which death marches were carried out. Violators were threatened with arrest. Strictly enforced censorship laws prevented Armenian survivors from publishing memoirs, prohibiting "any publication at odds with the general policies of the state". Those who acknowledge the genocide have been prosecuted under laws against "insulting Turkishness". Talat Pasha had decreed that "everything must be done to abolish even the word 'Armenia' in Turkey". In the postwar Turkish republic, Armenian cultural heritage has been subject to systematic destruction in an attempt to eradicate the Armenian presence. On 5 January 1916, Enver Pasha ordered all place names of Greek, Armenian, or Bulgarian origin to be changed, a policy fully implemented in the later republic, continuing into the 1980s. Mass graves of genocide victims have also been destroyed, although many still exist. After the 1918 armistice, incriminating documents in the Ottoman archives were systematically destroyed. The records of the postwar courts-martial in Constantinople have also disappeared. Recognizing that some archival documents supported its position, the Turkish government announced that the archives relevant to the "Armenian question" would be opened in 1985. According to Turkish historian Halil Berktay, diplomat Nuri Birgi conducted a second purge of the archives at this time. The archives were officially opened in 1989, but in practice, some archives remained sealed, and access to other archives was restricted to scholars sympathetic to the official Turkish narrative.

=== Turkish historiography ===
In Mustafa Kemal's 1927 Nutuk speech, which was the foundation of Kemalist historiography, the tactics of silence and denial are employed to deal with violence against Armenians. As in his other speeches, he presents Turks as innocent of any wrongdoing and as victims of horrific Armenian atrocities. For decades, Turkish historiography ignored the Armenian genocide. One of the early exceptions was the genocide perpetrator Esat Uras, who published The Armenians in History and the Armenian Question in 1950. Uras's book, probably written in response to post–World War II Soviet territorial claims, was a novel synthesis of earlier arguments deployed by the CUP during the war, and linked wartime denial with the "official narrative" on the genocide developed in the 1980s.

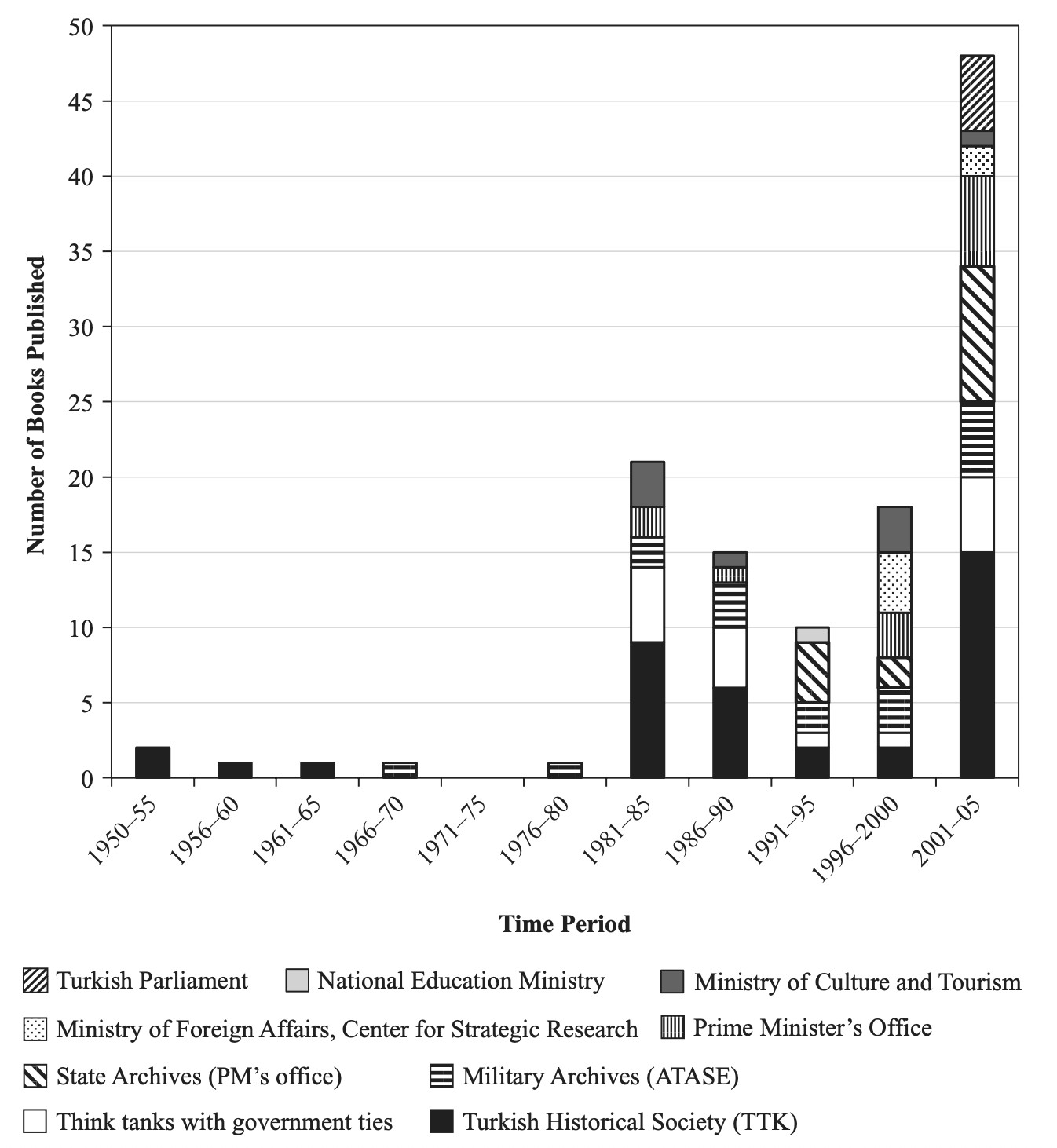
Number of official or quasi-official publications on the "Armenian question"

In the 1980s, following Armenian efforts for recognition of the genocide and a wave of assassinations by Armenian militants, Turkey began to present an official narrative of the "Armenian question", which it framed as an issue of contemporary terrorism rather than historical genocide. Retired diplomats were recruited to write denialist works, completed without professional methodology or ethical standards and based on cherry-picking archival information favorable to Turks and unfavorable to Armenians. The Council of Higher Education was set up in 1981 by the Turkish military junta, and has been instrumental in cementing "an alternative, 'national' scholarship with its own reference system", according to Gürpınar. Besides academic research, Türkkaya Ataöv taught the first university course on the "Armenian question" in 1983. By the twenty-first century, the Turkish Historical Society, known for publications upholding the official position of the Turkish government, had as one of its main functions the countering of genocide claims.

Around 1990, Taner Akçam, working in Germany, was the first Turkish historian to acknowledge and study the genocide. During the 1990s, private universities began to be established in Turkey, enabling challenges to state-sponsored views. In 2005, academics at three Turkish universities organized an academic conference dealing with the genocide. Scheduled to be held in May 2005, the conference was suspended following a campaign of intimidation, but eventually held in September. The conference represented the first major challenge to Turkey's founding myths in the public discourse of the country and resulted in the creation of an alternative, non-denialist historiography by elite academics in Istanbul and Ankara, in parallel to an ongoing denialist historiography. Turkish academics who accept and study the genocide as fact have been subjected to death threats and prosecution for insulting Turkishness. Western scholars generally ignore the Turkish denialist historiography because they consider its methods unscholarly—especially the selective use of sources.

=== Education ===
Turkish schools, public or private, are required to use history textbooks approved by the Ministry of Education. (Note: Some private schools and to a lesser extent some state schools also use alternative textbooks which are not approved by Ministry of Education.) The state uses this monopoly to increase support for the official denialist position, vilifying Armenians and presenting them as enemies. For decades, these textbooks did not mention Armenians as part of Ottoman history. Since the 1980s, textbooks discuss the "events of 1915", but deflect the blame from the Ottoman government to other actors. They accuse imperialist powers of manipulating the Armenians to undermine the empire, and allege that the Armenians committed treason or presented a threat. Some textbooks admit that deportations occurred and Armenians died, but present this action as necessary and justified. Since 2005, textbooks have accused Armenians of perpetrating genocide against Turkish Muslims. In 2003, students in each grade level were instructed to write essays refuting the genocide.

=== Society ===
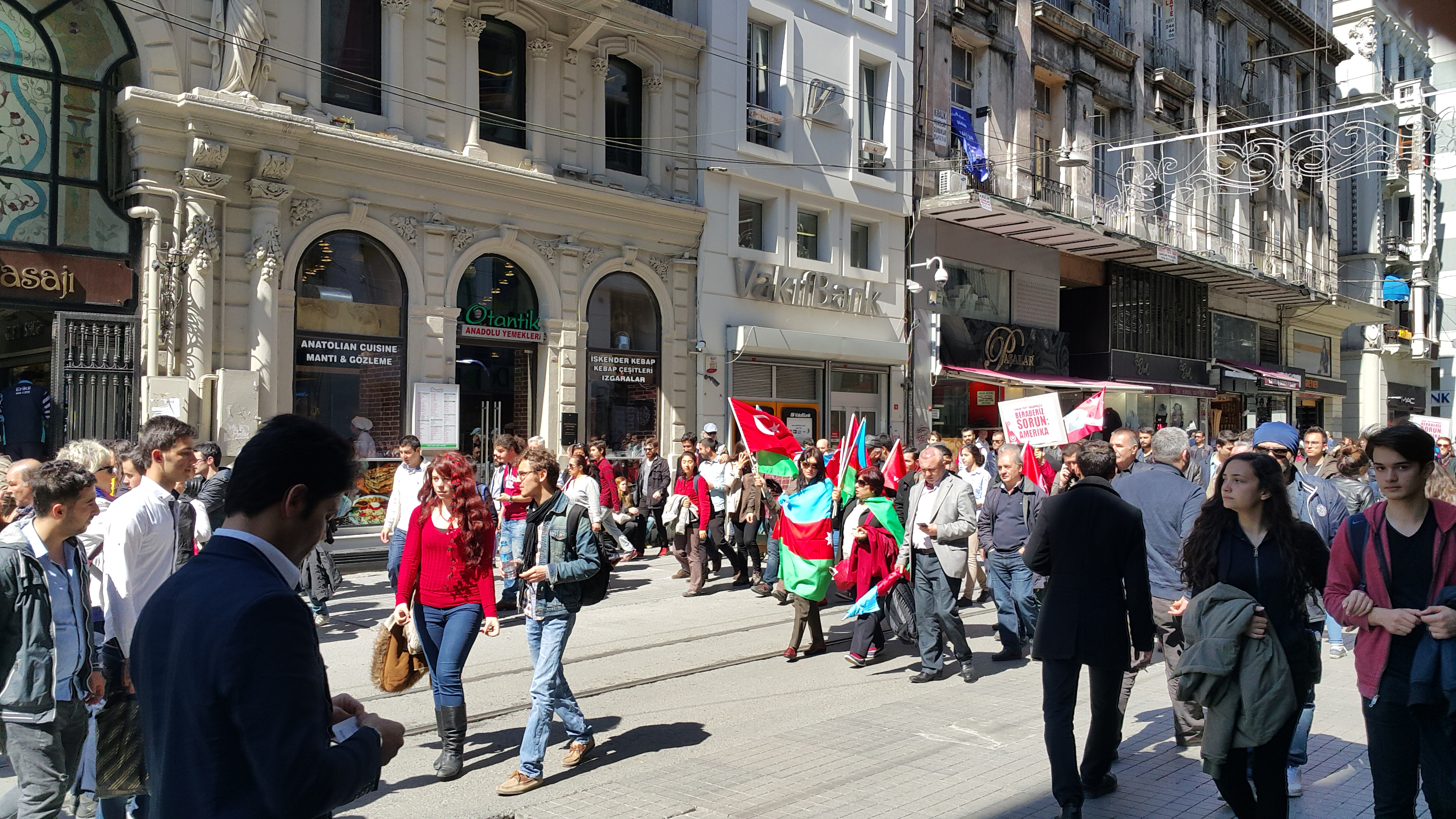
A protest against Armenian genocide recognition on the 100th anniversary on İstiklal Avenue, Istanbul

The genocide remains a taboo subject in Turkish society. Göçek states that it is the interaction between state and society that makes denial so persistent. Besides the Turkish state, Turkish intellectuals and civil society have also denied the genocide. Turkish fiction dealing with the genocide typically denies it, while claiming the fictional narrative is based on true events. Noting many people in eastern Turkey have passed down memories of the event, genocide scholar Uğur Ümit Üngör says that "the Turkish government is denying a genocide that its own population remembers." The Turkish state and most of society have engaged in similar silencing regarding other ethnic persecutions and human rights violations in the Ottoman Empire and Republican Turkey against Greeks, Assyrians, Kurds, Jews and Alevis.

Most Turks support the state's policies with regard to genocide denial. Some admit that massacres occurred but regard them as justified responses to Armenian treachery. Many still consider Armenians to be a fifth column. According to Halil Karaveli, "the word [genocide] incites strong, emotional reactions among Turks from all walks of society and of every ideological inclination". Turkish–Armenian journalist Hrant Dink was outspoken in his advocacy for facing historical truths to achieve a better society and reconciliation between ethnic groups. He was prosecuted for insulting Turkishness and was assassinated in 2007 by a Turkish ultranationalist. In 2013, a study sampling Turkish university students in the United States found that 65% agreed with the official view that Armenian deaths occurred as a result of "inter-communal warfare" and that another 10% blamed Armenians for causing the violence. A 2014 survey found that only 9% of Turkish citizens thought their government should recognize the genocide. Many believe that such an acknowledgement is imposed by Armenians and foreign powers with no benefit to Turkey. Many Kurds, who themselves have suffered political repression in Turkey, have recognized and condemned the genocide.

=== Politics ===
The Islamic conservative Justice and Development Party (AKP) came to power in 2002 and took an approach to history that was critical of both the CUP and the early Republican era. This position initially led to some liberalization and a wider range of views that could be expressed in the public sphere. The AKP presented its approach to the "events of 1915" as an alternative to genocide denial and genocide recognition, by emphasizing shared suffering. Over time, and especially since the 2016 failed coup, the AKP government became increasingly authoritarian; political repression and censorship has made it more difficult to discuss controversial topics such as the Armenian genocide. As of 2020, all major political parties in Turkey, except the pro-Kurdish Peoples' Democratic Party (HDP), as well as many pro- and anti-government media and civil society organizations, support denial. Both government and opposition parties have strongly opposed genocide recognition in other countries. No Turkish government has admitted what happened to the Armenians was a crime, let alone a genocide. On 24 April 2019, president Recep Tayyip Erdoğan tweeted, "The relocation of the Armenian gangs and their supporters ... was the most reasonable action that could be taken in such a period". In June 2026, Erdoğan stated that Turkish history "is free from genocide, massacres, oppression and colonialism."

== Foreign relations of Turkey ==
Turkish efforts to project its genocide denial overseas date to the 1920s, or, alternately, to the genocide itself. Turkey's century-long effort to deny the Armenian genocide sets this genocide apart from others in history. According to genocide scholar Roger W. Smith, "In no other instance has a government gone to such extreme lengths to deny that a massive genocide took place." Central to Turkey's ability to deny the genocide and counter its recognition is the country's strategic position in the Middle East, Cold War alliance with the West, and membership of NATO. Historians have described the role of other countries in enabling Turkey's genocide denial as a form of collusion.

At the Lausanne Conference of 1922–1923, Turkish representatives repeated the version of Armenian history that had been developed during the war. The resulting Treaty of Lausanne annulled the previous Treaty of Sèvres which had mandated the prosecution of Ottoman war criminals and the restoration of property to Christian survivors. Instead, Lausanne granted impunity to all perpetrators. After the 1980 Turkish military coup, Turkey developed more institutionalized ways of countering genocide claims. In 1981, the foreign ministry established a dedicated office (İAGM) specifically to promote Turkey's view of the Armenian genocide. In 2001, a further centralization created the Committee to Coordinate the Struggle with the Baseless Genocide Claims (ASİMKK). The Institute for Armenian Research, a think tank which focuses exclusively on the Armenian issue, was created in 2001 following the French Parliament's recognition of the genocide. ASİMKK disbanded after the 2017 Turkish constitutional referendum.

According to sociologist Levon Chorbajian, Turkey's "modus operandi remains consistent throughout and seeks maximalist positions, offers no compromise though sometimes hints at it, and employs intimidation and threats." Motivated by belief in a global Jewish conspiracy, the Turkish foreign ministry has recruited Turkish Jews to participate in denialist efforts. Turkish Jewish leaders helped defeat resolutions recognizing the genocide, and avoid mentioning it at academic conferences and in Holocaust museums. As of 2015, Turkey spends millions of dollars each year lobbying against the genocide's recognition. Akçam stated in 2020 that Turkey has definitively lost the information war over the Armenian genocide on both the academic and diplomatic fronts, its official narrative being treated like ordinary denialism.

=== Germany ===
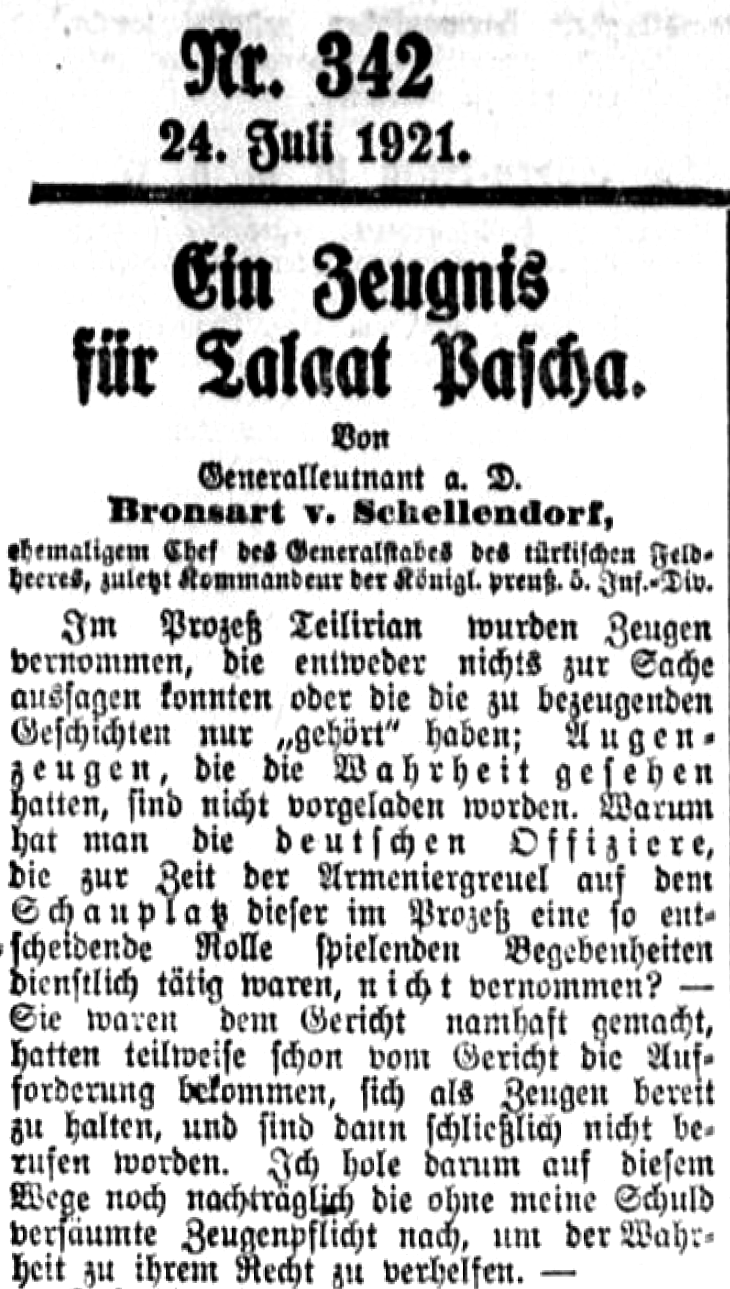
"A Tribute for Talaat Pasha" by German general Fritz Bronsart von Schellendorf, published in Deutsche Allgemeine Zeitung on 24 July 1921

From 1915 to 1918, Germany and the Ottoman Empire undertook "joint propaganda efforts of denial." German newspapers repeated the Ottoman government's denial of committing atrocities and stories of alleged Armenian treachery. The government censorship handbook mandated strict limits on speech about Armenians, although penalties for violations were light. On 11 January 1916, socialist deputy Karl Liebknecht raised the issue of the Armenian genocide in the Reichstag, receiving the reply that the Ottoman government "has been forced, due to the seditious machinations of our enemies, to transfer the Armenian population of certain areas, and to assign them new places of residence." Laughter interrupted Liebknecht's follow-up questions. During the 1921 trial of Soghomon Tehlirian for the assassination of Talat Pasha, so much evidence was revealed that denial became untenable. German nationalists instead portrayed what they acknowledged as the intentional extermination of the Armenian people as justified.

In March 2006, Turkish nationalist groups organized two rallies in Berlin intended to commemorate "the murder of Talat Pasha" and protest "the lie of genocide." German politicians criticized the march, and turnout was low. When the Bundestag voted to recognize the Armenian genocide in 2016, Turkish media harshly criticized the resolution and eleven deputies of Turkish origin received police protection because of death threats. Germany's large Turkish community has been cited as a reason why the government hesitated, and Turkish organizations lobbied against the resolution and organized demonstrations.

=== United States ===
Historian Donald Bloxham states that, "In a very real sense, 'genocide denial' was accepted and furthered by the United States government before the term genocide had even been coined." In interwar Turkey, prominent American diplomats like Mark Lambert Bristol and Joseph Grew endorsed the Turkish nationalist view that the Armenian genocide was a war against the forces of imperialism. In 1922, before receiving the Chester concession, Colby Chester argued that Christians of Anatolia were not massacred; his writing exhibited many of the themes of later genocide denial. In the 1930s, the Turkish embassy scuttled a planned film adaptation of Franz Werfel's popular novel The Forty Days of Musa Dagh by the American company MGM, threatening a boycott of American films. Turkish embassies, with the support of the US State Department, shot down attempts to revive the film in the 1950s and 1960s.

Turkey began political lobbying around 1975. Şükrü Elekdağ, Turkish ambassador to the United States from 1979 to 1989, worked aggressively to counter the trend of Armenian genocide recognition by courting academics, business interests, and Jewish groups. Committee members of the United States Holocaust Memorial Museum reported Elekdağ told them that the safety of Jews in Turkey was not guaranteed if the museum covered the Armenian genocide. Under his tenure, the Institute of Turkish Studies (ITS) was set up, funded by $3 million from Turkey, and the country spent $1 million annually on public relations. In 2000, Elekdağ complained ITS had "lost its function and its effectiveness." Turkey threatened to cut off the United States' access to key air bases in Turkey, were it to recognize the genocide. In 2007, a Congressional resolution for genocide recognition failed because of Turkish pressure. Opponents of the bill said a genocide had taken place, but argued against formal recognition to preserve good relations with Turkey. Each year since 1994, the United States president has issued a commemorative message on 24 April. Turkey has sometimes made concessions to keep the president from using the word "genocide". In 2019, both houses of Congress passed resolutions formally recognizing the genocide.

=== United Kingdom ===
The human rights lawyer Geoffrey Robertson charged that around 2000, "genocide denial had entrenched itself in the Eastern Department [of the Foreign and Commonwealth Office (FCO)] ... to such an extent that it was briefing ministers with a bare-faced disregard for readily ascertainable facts", such as its own records from the time. In 2006, in response to a debate initiated by MP Steven Pound, a representative of the FCO said the United Kingdom did not recognize the genocide because "the evidence is not sufficiently unequivocal".

=== Israel ===
According to historians Rıfat Bali and Marc David Baer, Armenian genocide denial was the most important factor in the normalization of Israel–Turkey relations. The 1982 International Conference on the Holocaust and Genocide, which took place in Tel Aviv, included six presentations on the Armenian genocide. Turkey threatened that if the conference was held, it would close its borders to Jewish refugees from Iran and Syria, putting their lives in danger. As a result, the Israeli Foreign Ministry joined the ultimately unsuccessful effort to cancel the conference.

In April 2001, a Turkish newspaper quoted foreign minister Shimon Peres as saying, "We reject attempts to create a similarity between the Holocaust and the Armenian allegations. Nothing similar to the Holocaust occurred. It is a tragedy what the Armenians went through, but not a genocide." According to Charny and Auron, this statement crossed the line into active denial of the Armenian genocide. Scholar Eldad Ben Aharon considers that Peres simply made explicit what had been Israel's policy since 1948. Israel–Turkey relations deteriorated in the late 2010s, but Israel's relations with Azerbaijan are close and the Azerbaijan–Israel International Association has lobbied against recognition of the genocide. In the 2020s, after Turkey supported South Africa's case at the International Court of Justice accusing Israel of committing genocide in Gaza during the Gaza war, Israel changed its policy and acknowledged the Armenian genocide.

== Denialism in academia ==
Until the twenty-first century, Ottoman and Turkish studies marginalized the killings of Armenians, which many academics portrayed as a wartime measure justified by emergency and avoided discussing in depth. These fields have long enjoyed close institutional links with the Turkish state. Statements by these academics were cited to further the Turkish denial agenda. Historians who recognized the genocide feared professional retaliation for expressing their views. The methodology of denial has been compared to the tactics of the tobacco industry or global warming denial: funding of biased research, creating a smokescreen of doubt, and thereby manufacturing a controversy where there is no genuine academic dispute.

Beginning in the 1980s, the Turkish government has funded research institutes to prevent recognition of the genocide. On 19 May 1985, The New York Times and The Washington Post ran an advertisement from the Assembly of Turkish American Associations in which 69 academics—most of the professors of Ottoman history working in the United States at the time—called on Congress not to adopt the resolution on the Armenian genocide. Many of the signatories received research grants funded by the Turkish government, and a majority were not specialists on the late Ottoman Empire. Heath Lowry, director of the Institute of Turkish Studies, helped secure the signatures; for his efforts, Lowry received the Foundation for the Promotion and Recognition of Turkey Prize. Over the next decade, Turkey funded six chairs of Ottoman and Turkish studies to counter recognition of the genocide; Lowry was appointed to one of the chairs. According to historian Keith David Watenpaugh, the resolution had "a terrible and lasting influence on the rising generation of scholars." In 2000, Elekdağ admitted the statement had become useless because none of the original signatories besides Justin McCarthy would agree to sign another, similar declaration.

More recent academic denialism in the United States has focused on an alleged Armenian uprising, said to justify the persecution of Armenians as a legitimate counterinsurgency. In 2009, the University of Utah opened its "Turkish Studies Project", funded by the Turkish Coalition of America (TCA) and led by M. Hakan Yavuz, with Elekdağ on the advisory board. The University of Utah Press has published several books denying the genocide, beginning with Guenter Lewy's The Armenian Massacres in Ottoman Turkey (2006). Lewy's book had been rejected by eleven publishers and, according to Marc Mamigonian, became "one of the key texts of modern denial". TCA has also provided financial support to several authors including McCarthy, Michael Gunter, Yücel Güçlü, and Edward J. Erickson for writing books that deny the Armenian genocide. According to Richard G. Hovannisian, of recent deniers in academia, almost all have connections to Turkey and those with Turkish citizenship have all worked for the Turkish foreign ministry.

=== Academic integrity controversies ===
Many scholars consider it unethical for academics to deny the Armenian genocide. Beyond that, there have been several controversies about academic integrity relating to denial of the genocide. In 1990, psychiatrist Robert Jay Lifton received a letter from Nüzhet Kandemir, Turkish ambassador to the United States, questioning references to the Armenian genocide in one of Lifton's books. The ambassador inadvertently included a draft of a letter from Lowry advising the ambassador on how to prevent mention of the Armenian genocide in scholarly works. Lowry was later named Atatürk Professor of Ottoman Studies at Princeton University, which the Turkish government had endowed with a $750,000 grant. His actions were described as "subversion of scholarship"; he later said it was a mistake to have written the letter.

In 2006, Ottomanist historian Donald Quataert—one of the 69 signatories of the 1985 statement to the United States Congress—reviewed The Great Game of Genocide, a book about the Armenian genocide, agreeing that "genocide" was the right word to use; the article challenged what Quataert termed "the Ottomanist wall of silence" on the issue. Weeks later, he resigned as chairman of the board of directors of the Institute of Turkish Studies after Turkish officials threatened that if he did not retract his statements, the institute's funding would be withdrawn. Several members of the board resigned and both the Middle East Studies Association and Turkish Studies Association criticized the violation of Quataert's academic freedom.

In a lecture he delivered in June 2011, Akçam stated that a Turkish foreign ministry official told him that the Turkish government was offering money to academics in the United States for denial of the genocide, noting the coincidence between what his source said and Gunter's book Armenian History and the Question of Genocide. Hovannisian believes that books denying the genocide are published because of flaws in peer review leading to "a strong linkage among several mutually sympathetic reviewers" without submitting the books to academics who would point out errors.

== Rhetoric ==
The official Turkish view is based on the belief that the Armenian genocide was a legitimate state action and therefore cannot be challenged on legal or moral grounds. Publications from this point of view share many of the basic facts with non-denialist histories, but differ in their interpretation and emphases. CUP leaders decided to commit genocide in large part because they perceived Armenians as an existential threat to the empire in a time of war; denialist works follow this line of reasoning, while rejecting the CUP's intent to exterminate the Armenian people. Historian Ronald Grigor Suny summarizes the main denialist argument as, "There was no genocide, and the Armenians were to blame for it."

Denialist works also portray Armenians as terrorists and secessionists, shifting the blame from the CUP to the Armenians. According to this logic, the deportations of Armenian civilians was a justified and proportionate response to Armenian treachery, either real or as perceived by the Ottoman authorities. Proponents attribute collective guilt to all Armenians for the military resistance of some, despite the fact that the law of war criminalizes the deliberate killing of civilians. Talat Pasha admitted to "not making a distinction between guilty and innocent Armenians", stating it was impossible because "one who was still innocent today could be guilty tomorrow". Deaths are blamed on factors beyond the control of the Ottoman authorities, such as weather, disease, or rogue local officials. The role of the Special Organization is denied and massacres are instead blamed on Kurds, "brigands", and "armed gangs" that supposedly operated outside the control of the central government.

Other arguments include:

- That there was a "civil war" or generalized Armenian uprising planned by the Armenian Revolutionary Federation (ARF) in collusion with Russia. Neither Ottoman archives nor other sources support this hypothesis, as admitted by one proponent of this theory, Edward Erickson.
- That the number of Armenians who died was 300,000 or fewer, perhaps no more than 100,000. Bloxham sees this as part of a more general theme of deliberately understating the Armenian presence in the Ottoman Empire to undermine any demands for autonomy or independence.
- That certain groups of Armenians were spared, which proponents argue proves there was no systematic effort to exterminate the Armenian people. Some have falsely claimed that Catholic and Protestant Armenians and the families of Armenian soldiers serving in the Ottoman Army were not deported. The survival of the Armenians of Smyrna and Constantinople—planned by the CUP but only partially carried out because of German pressure—is also cited to deny that the CUP leadership had genocidal intent.
- False assertions that the Ottoman rulers took actions to safeguard Armenian lives and property during their deportation, and prosecuted 1,397 people for harming Armenians during the genocide.
- That many of the sources cited by historians of the genocide are unreliable or forged, including the accounts of Armenian survivors and Western diplomats and the records of the Ottoman Special Military Tribunal, to the point that the Prime Ministerial Ottoman Archive is considered the only reliable source.
- The assertion that Turks are incapable of committing genocide, an argument often supported by exaggerated claims of Ottoman and Turkish benevolence towards Jews. At an official ceremony to commemorate the Holocaust in 2014, Turkish foreign minister Mevlüt Çavuşoğlu claimed that, in contrast to Christian Europe, "There is no trace of genocide in our history." During a visit to Sudan in 2006, Prime Minister Recep Tayyip Erdoğan denied there had been a Darfur genocide because "a Muslim cannot commit genocide".
- That claims of genocide stem from prejudice, such as Islamophobia, Orientalism, and Turkophobia. These arguments attack the accuracy and integrity of survivor testimony by portraying Armenians as gullible pawns of Western imperialism, promoting a distorted history to further an imperialist agenda.
- At the extreme end of denialist claims is that it is not Turks who committed genocide against Armenians but vice versa, as articulated by the Iğdır Genocide Memorial and Museum.

Denial of the Armenian genocide is compared frequently to Holocaust denial because of similar tactics of misrepresenting evidence, false equivalence, claiming that atrocities were invented by war propaganda and that powerful lobbies manufacture genocide allegations for their own profit, subsuming one-sided systematic extermination into war deaths, and shifting blame from the perpetrators to the victims of genocide. Both forms of negationism share the goal of rehabilitating the ideologies which brought genocide about.

== Legality ==
According to former International Criminal Tribunal for the former Yugoslavia (ICTY) judge Flavia Lattanzi, the present Turkish government's "denial of past Ottoman and Turkish authorities' wrongdoings is a new violation of international law".

Some European countries have adopted laws to criminalize denial of the genocide; such laws are controversial, opponents arguing that they erode freedom of speech. In 1993, French newspapers printed several interviews with British-American historian Bernard Lewis in which he argued there was no Armenian genocide because the Armenians brought their fate upon themselves. A French state prosecutor brought criminal proceedings against him for these statements under the Gayssot Law. The prosecution failed, as the court determined that the law did not apply to events before World War II. In a 1995 civil proceeding brought by three Armenian genocide survivors, a French court censured Lewis' remarks under Article 1382 of the Civil Code and fined him one franc, and ordering the publication of the judgment at Lewis' cost in Le Monde. The court ruled that while Lewis has the right to his views, their expression harmed a third party and that "it is only by hiding elements which go against his thesis that the defendant was able to state there was no 'serious proof' of the Armenian Genocide".

In March 2007, a Swiss court found Doğu Perinçek, a member of the Talat Pasha Committee (named after the main perpetrator of the genocide), guilty under the Swiss law that outlawed genocide denial. Perinçek appealed; in December, the Swiss Supreme Court confirmed his sentence. The European Court of Human Rights (ECtHR) overturned the verdict in Perinçek v. Switzerland on freedom of speech grounds. Since the ECtHR has ruled that member states may criminalize Holocaust denial, the verdict has been criticized for creating a double standard between the Holocaust and other genocides, along with failure to acknowledge anti-Armenianism as a motivation for genocide denial. Although the court did not rule on whether the events of 1915 constituted genocide, several separate opinions recognized the genocide as a historical fact. Perinçek misrepresented the verdict by saying, "We put an end to the genocide lie."

== Consequences ==
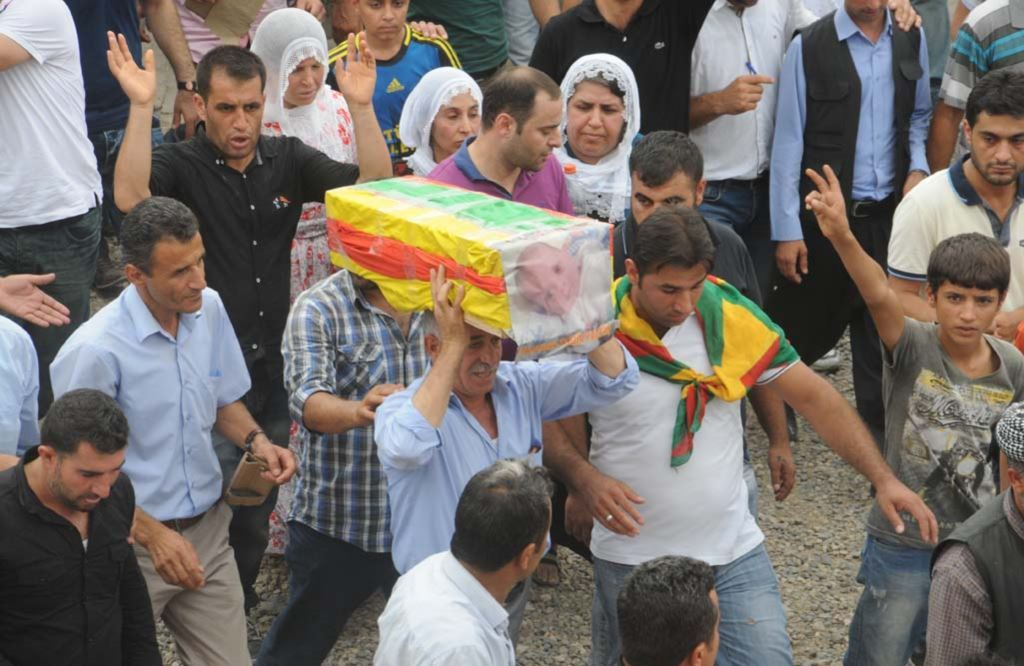
Funeral of a baby killed in the Şırnak clashes, 2015

Kieser, Göçek, and Cheterian state that ongoing denial prevents Turkey from achieving a full democracy including pluralism and human rights, and that this denial fosters state repression of minority groups in Turkey, especially Kurds. Akçam says that genocide denial "rationaliz[es] the violent persecution of religious and ethnic minorities" and desensitizes the population to future episodes of mass violence. Until the Turkish state acknowledges genocide, he argues, "there is a potential there, always, that it can do it again". Vicken Cheterian says that genocide denial "pollutes the political culture of entire societies, where violence and threats become part of a political exercise degrading basic rights and democratic practice". When recognizing the Armenian genocide in April 2015, Pope Francis added, "concealing or denying evil is like allowing a wound to keep bleeding without bandaging it".

Denial has also affected Armenians, particularly those who live in Turkey. Historian Talin Suciyan states that the Armenian genocide and its denial "led to a series of other policies that perpetuated the process by liquidating their properties, silencing and marginalising the survivors, and normalising all forms of violence against them". According to an article in the Journal of Aggression, Maltreatment & Trauma, "[d]enial prevents healing of the wounds inflicted by genocide, and constitutes an attack on the collective identity and national cultural continuity of the victimized people". Göçek argues "the lack of acknowledgement literally prevents the wounds opened by past violence to ever heal". The activities of Armenian militant groups in the 1970s and 1980s, like the Armenian Secret Army for the Liberation of Armenia and the Justice Commandos of the Armenian Genocide, was caused partly by the failure of peaceful efforts to elicit Turkish acknowledgement of the genocide. Some historians, such as Stefan Ihrig, have argued that impunity for the perpetrators of the Armenian genocide, as well as silence or justification from bystanders of the crime, emboldened the perpetrators of the Holocaust.

=== In Azerbaijan ===
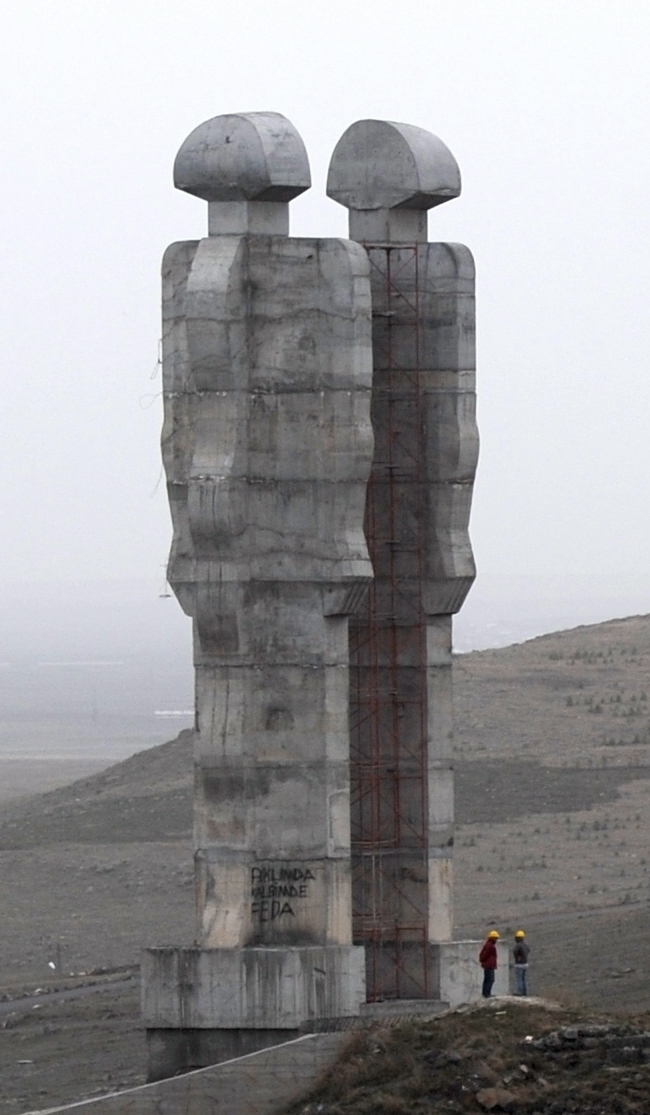
Monument to Humanity by Mehmet Aksoy in Kars, Turkey. Intended to commemorate all war victims, it was erected without input from the Armenian community.

Turkey joined Azerbaijan in imposing a blockade of Armenia in 1993, following the First Nagorno-Karabakh War between Armenia and Azerbaijan. The closed border harms the economies of Armenia and eastern Turkey. Although Armenia was willing to normalize relations without preconditions, Turkey demanded that Armenia abandon all attempts at promoting international recognition of the Armenian genocide. There have been two major attempts at Turkish-Armenian reconciliation—the Turkish Armenian Reconciliation Commission (2000–2004) and the Zurich Protocols (2009)—both of which failed partly because of the controversy over the Armenian genocide. In both cases, the mediators did their best to sideline historical disputes, which proved impossible. Armenian diaspora groups opposed both initiatives and especially a historical commission to investigate what they considered established facts. Bloxham asserts that since "denial has always been accompanied by rhetoric of Armenian treachery, aggression, criminality, and territorial ambition, it actually enunciates an ongoing if latent threat of Turkish 'revenge'."

Since the beginning of the Nagorno-Karabakh conflict, Azerbaijan has adopted Turkey's genocide denial and worked to promote denialism internationally. The Armenian genocide is also widely denied by Azerbaijani civil society. Many Armenians saw a connection between the genocide and later anti-Armenian violence like the 1988 Sumgait pogrom, though the connection between the Karabakh conflict and the Armenian genocide is mostly made by Azerbaijani elites. Azerbaijani nationalists accused Armenians of staging the Sumgait pogrom and other anti-Armenian pogroms, similar to the Turkish discourse on the Armenian genocide.

Eldad Aharon, foreign policy analyst, states that Turkey's denial of the Armenian Genocide is "fundamental to Azerbaijan's national identity," reinforcing their solidarity within the "one nation, two states" framework. Henry Theriault, former director of the IAGS, states that in Turkish and Azeri society denial coexists with the celebration of genocidal acts because there is no accountability: "in such situations, denial is inverted into celebratory or invective declaration...Thus, Turkey’s president Recep Tayyip Erdoğan’s supporters can make explicit statements about completing the genocide of 1915 to eliminate all Armenians, referred to...by Erdoğan as 'leftovers of the sword[s]' that were swung one hundred five years ago..."

Azerbaijan state propaganda claims that the Armenians have perpetrated a genocide against Azeris over two centuries, a genocide that includes the Treaty of Gulistan (1813), the Treaty of Turkmenchay (1828), Baku Commune, the January 1990 deployment of Soviet troops to Baku (following the massacres of Armenians in Baku), and especially the 1992 Khojali massacre. According to this propaganda, Armenians committed "the real genocide" and are accused of killing or deporting as many as 2 million Azeris throughout this period. Following Azerbaijan, Turkey and the Turkish diaspora have lobbied for recognition of the Khojali massacre as a genocide to downplay the Armenian genocide. Azerbaijan sees any country that recognizes the Armenian genocide as an enemy and has even threatened sanctions. Cheterian argues that the "unresolved historic legacy of the 1915 genocide" helped cause the Karabakh conflict and prevent its resolution, while "the ultimate crime itself continues to serve simultaneously as a model and as a threat, as well as a source of existential fear".
