= Sam Kaplan =

Sam or Samuel Kaplan may refer to:

- Sam Kaplan (American football)
- Sam Kaplan, anthropologist and author of The Pedagogical State
- Samuel L. Kaplan, US ambassador to Morocco
- Sam Kaplan, a character in the play Street Scene, and the film adaptation
- Samuel Kaplan, American basketball player and politician
