= Institute for Armenian Research =

Armenian genocide denial institution

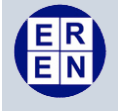
- Formation: 2001; 25 years ago
- Founders: R. Ambassador Ömer Engin Lütem
- Dissolved: January 1, 2009; 17 years ago
- Type: Think tank
- Legal status: Non-profit Think tank sub-working group
- Purpose: Policy analysis
- Headquarters: Ankara, Turkey.
- Coordinates: 39.86280215529061°N 32.85709226928827°E
- Region served: Worldwide
- Director: R. Ambassador Ömer Engin Lütem
- Affiliations: Independent
- Staff: 9 (2001)
- Website: www.eraren.org

Institute for Armenian Research (Ermeni Araştırmaları Enstitüsü; EREN;ERAREN) was a privately funded think tank sub-working group in Turkey established in April 2001 by the Center for Eurasian Strategic Studies. Ömer Engin Lütem was the chairman of ERAREN. In 2009, ERAREN was dissolved. It decided to carry out its activities as Center for Eurasian Studies (AVİM).

== Research ==
The Institute explored among others the following topics:

- Genocide studies
- Armenian genocide
- Turkish-Armenian relations
- Turkey-Armenia relations
- Armenian diaspora

== Publications ==
- Armenian Studies (Ermeni Araştırmaları), bilingual quarterly in Turkish and English, published since 2001. ISSN 1303-068X
- Review of Armenian Studies, English quarterly, published since 2002 ISSN 1303-5304
- Daily bulletin in Turkish and in English is published on the website.

The Institute for Armenian Research organized two conferences in Turkey, bringing together academics specialising in Armenia and the Armenian Diaspora, in April 2002 and in 2004.

== Staff ==
- Kamer Kasim
- Ibrahim Kaya
- Serdar Palaybiyik
- Yıldız Deveci Bozkuş

== See also ==
- Center for Eurasian Strategic Studies
