= Monument to Humanity =

Former sculpture by Mehmet Aksoy

Coordinates: 40°36′39″N 43°05′10″E

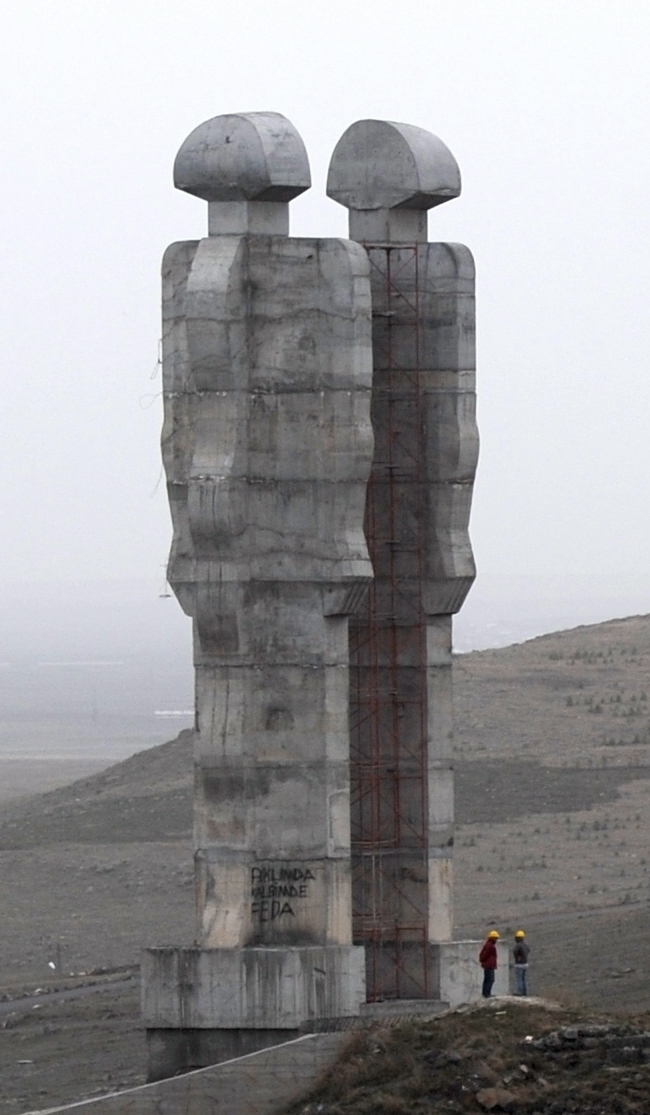
Monument to Humanity under construction in 2009

Monument to Humanity (Turkish: İnsanlık Anıtı, Armenian: Մարդկության հուշարձան, romanized: Mardkut'yan hushardzan, lit. 'Monument of Humanity') was a nearly completed statue in Kars, Turkey. Created by Turkish artist Mehmet Aksoy, the 30-metre-tall (98 ft) monument stood atop Kazıktepe, across from the ancient Castle of Kars. Visible from neighboring Armenia, the statue depicted two halves of a man, each reaching to hold the other's hand. The monument was demolished in April 2011, only months after being criticized by then–prime minister Recep Tayyip Erdoğan as a "freak" or "monstrosity".

== Background ==
The statue was commissioned by the Kars municipality as a gesture of reconciliation in Armenia–Turkey relations following the Zurich Protocols, a 2009 accord to establish formal diplomatic recognition between the two countries. Then–mayor of Kars, Naif Alibeyoğlu, referred to the statue as "his dream," that would help bring together the "brothers and sisters" of the two nations.

However, the statue was also criticized, because it was erected without any consultation with the Armenian community, and represented a one-sided imposition rather than "reconciliation". Egemen Özbek writes:

the use of the blanket category "humanity" obscures crucial cultural and political differences between ethno-religious groups, and difference in responsibility for, and benefits from, the Armenian genocide... a commemorative project that does not engage with questions of historical responsibility, recognition, and justice runs the risk of eternalizing the post-genocide status quo which favors the Turkish position and reproduces an asymmetry of power, without recognizing historical wrongs committed against the Armenians.

== Demolition ==
Turkish Prime Minister Recep Tayyip Erdoğan described the monument as a "freak" or a "monstrosity" (Turkish: ucube) during a visit to Kars on 8 January 2011. In spite of protests, the city authority decided to remove the statue.

On 26 April 2011, demolition began with the dismounting of the sculpture's two heads, which Armenian sources considered effectively a decapitation. Aksoy also said "I felt as if my children were being beheaded." An official statement by the demolition company stated: "In order to dismantle it, first the head will be cut off and taken down with the help of a crane. Then, in the following ten days, the statue will be dismembered into 20 pieces." The demolition was completed on 14 June 2011.

While Erdoğan insisted that this was merely a question of aesthetics, international observers believed the demolition an attempt to appeal to nationalist sentiment ahead of the 2011 general election, concurring with Aksoy, who said Erdoğan was "maneuvering to consolidate his reactionary base in the run-up to elections," and that he "bagged the vote of local Azeris," who denounced extending a hand to Armenia.

== Aftermath ==
As a response to Erdoğan's comments, Aksoy filed a lawsuit against Erdoğan for insulting him. Erdoğan's lawyer claimed it was a critique rather than an insult, but on 3 March 2015, an Istanbul court fined Erdoğan 10,000 Turkish lira for the insult, a ruling that was termed "a refreshing move by the Turkish judiciary" by oppositional commentator Sibel Hürtaş. However later on, a local court overturned that verdict. Aksoy announced he would spend the money for a Nevruz Day party with his friends, thereby directing haram (Arabic for "immoral") money to its adequately haram purpose. In July 2019, the Constitutional Court ruled that its demolition violated Aksoy's freedom of expression and that he shall be compensated.

== See also ==
- List of tallest statues
