= The Armenian Massacres in Ottoman Turkey =

Book by Guenter Lewy

The Armenian Massacres in Ottoman Turkey: A Disputed Genocide is a 2006 book by Guenter Lewy about the Armenian genocide in the Ottoman Empire. In the book, Lewy argues that the high death toll among Ottoman Armenians was a byproduct of the conditions of the marches and on sporadic attacks rather than a planned attempt to exterminate them.

The book was published by University of Utah Press after being rejected by eleven publishers and was promoted by the Turkish government. Although some reviewers who agreed with Lewy's belief that the Armenians were not victims of a genocide praised the book, its reception was overall negative with other reviewers identifying significant "errors of fact, interpretation, and omission". Furthermore, the book was criticized for repeating the collective guilt argument used by the Young Turks to justify the genocide that they ordered.

== Background ==
According to Tessa Hofmann, a researcher at the Berlin's Free University, Lewy had conceived the idea of writing about the Armenian genocide as early as 2000. Hofmann recalled that, during the summer of that year, Lewy discussed with her his intention to subject the Armenian massacres to a similar reassessment to his earlier work on the Nazi persecution of the Sinti and Roma. Lewy's subsequent book, The Armenian Massacres in Ottoman Turkey: A Disputed Genocide, was published several years later and examined whether the evidence supported the characterization of the Ottoman government's actions as genocide.

In the summer of 2000 a retiree, resting on my couch, expressed a strange intention. Guenter Lewy, the retired American political scientist, wanted to subject "the Armenian massacres" to a similar revision as he had done before with respect to the Sinti and the Roma. That revision, argued Lewy, had shown that even though their fate in World War II proved tragic, it did not represent a "real" genocide, as there were no centrally organized and state-sponsored premeditation and genocidal intention.

Since he does not read Ottoman Turkish, Lewy relied on two unnamed individuals to translate materials for him.

After it was rejected by eleven publishers including four university presses, the book's publication by University of Utah Press was arranged by M. Hakan Yavuz.

== Contents ==
The work focuses on the Armenian genocide during 1915-1916 and provides no coverage of subsequent years.

Lewy argued that there was not enough evidence to support the conclusion that the Ottoman government deliberately attempted to destroy the Armenian population through a genocide. Akçam stated that this was the "central thesis" of the book with this statement made on several occasions. The author stated that the high death toll was simply a byproduct of the conditions of the marches and on sporadic attacks rather than a planned attempt to kill the Armenians.

According to the author, evidence that stated that the genocide was deliberate was doctored: The Memoirs of Naim Bey, the documents of the Turkish courts-martial of 1919–1920, and other documents related to the Special Organization (SO). He also argued that hearsay formed the basis of The Treatment of Armenians in the Ottoman Empire (nicknamed the "Blue Book"), and that the speech made by Reşit Akif Pasha accusing the Committee of Union and Progress (CUP) Central Committee of instigating a genocide was dishonestly made.

Lewy, who decided that a lack of competence in the Ottoman authorities was the reason for the deaths, as well as local government officials disobeying the central government, includes criticisms of the Ottoman government, stating that it took too harsh action against perceived Armenian threats, that the number of Armenian deaths and amount of damage exceeded that of what the Turks experienced, and that the Ottoman government did not provide adequate protections for any ethnic group.

Lewy's book criticizes the work of many scholars of the Armenian Genocide, including Donald Bloxham, Richard Hovannisian, Taner Akçam, Erik Jan Zürcher, Ronald Suny, Robert Melson, Leo Kuper, and David Lang, but especially Vahakn Dadrian.

== Reception ==
=== Methodology ===
Akçam argued that the central thesis of the book was an unproven theory while Lewy himself argued that the idea of genocide being planned was a theory; Akçam also stated that there were other documents that proved the genocide was planned. Akçam also stated that the author misinterpreted some documents, that his lack of skills in Turkish hampered his research, and that Lewy was not informed of current research. In addition Akçam disliked the author's dichotomy of "Armenian" and "Turkish" "sides" to the Armenian genocide denial dispute, as it conflates Armenians of differing allegiances together and because "it should be an unacceptable attitude for a social scientist to classify the differences of interpretation of these events according to ethnic origin."

Historian Richard Hovannisian discusses the book in an academic article on Armenian genocide denial, stating, "Like others in the modern period actively contesting the use of the term genocide for the Armenian case, Lewy picks and chooses bits of information and quotations to build his case." Joseph A. Kéchichian also criticized the book for denying the genocide and resorting to "pronounced selectivity of data, deflection, distortion, and occasional falsification" to support this thesis. Historian Hilmar Kaiser states that Lewy's "explanations for the causes of Armenian deaths remain unconvincing" and that, on points that did not fit his thesis, "Lewy chose to ignore the archival and published records". Kaiser states that "Lewy does not clearly distinguish between academic studies, pamphlets, various types of memoirs" and "major parts of the book do not meet academic standards".

Edward J. Erickson praised the book, writing "This is an important book because it presents a much-needed corrective to the one-sided view that many have of the Armenian deportations and massacres." Norman Stone, professor emeritus at Oxford University called Lewy's book "the best recent account of the Armenian massacres". Canadian journalist Gwynne Dyer also supported Lewy's thesis. Turkish authors Fatih Balci (University of Utah) and Arif Argul (Princeton University) also praised Lewy's conclusions.

=== Armenian genocide denial ===
In the book, Lewy states that "the Armenians can hardly claim that they suffered for no reason at all... large numbers of them had fought the Turks openly or played the role of a fifth column; not surprisingly, with their backs against the wall, the Ottomans reacted resolutely, if not viciously". A. Dirk Moses responds to this "telling slip", stating that Lewy falls into the trap of attributing collective guilt from Armenian combatants to the defenceless women and children from other parts of the country who were deported. Moses notes that law of war makes a strict distinction between civilians and combatants and that "The collective guilt accusation is unacceptable in scholarship, let alone in normal discourse and is, I think, one of the key ingredients in genocidal thinking." Quoting the same passage, Thomas de Waal writes that "Lewy repeats the Young Turks’ trick of justifying collective punishment of a whole nation".

According to Marc A. Mamigonian, the book is one of "the key texts of modern denial". Mamigonian faults Lewy for making excuses for the Ottoman government's actions. Norman Naimark does not consider the book to be denialist, but is nevertheless critical of Lewy's main argument: "if Lewy wishes to maintain his claims to historical objectivity by using accepted judicial definitions of genocide, then the difficulty of finding direct evidence for the Young Turks’ premeditated planning of mass murder should not prevent him from concluding that genocide took place. At its core, then, Lewy’s argument is illogical".

McCarthy wrote that it as "an outstanding work of historiography". Michael M. Gunter, after having written a positive statement that was used on the cover of The Armenian Massacres in Ottoman Turkey, wrote a review of the book for the International Journal of Middle East Studies (IJMES) without the editors' knowledge that he had made the positive statement. History News Network stated that the review "reportedly arrived in their office sans cover." Two academics, Joseph A. Kéchichian, and Keith David Watenpaugh, criticized the presence of the review in the IJMES. Gunter issued a response to his critics.
