= Michael Gunter =

American academic

Academic background
- Education: Columbia University (BA, MIA); Kent State University (PhD)

Academic work
- Discipline: Kurdish studies
- Institutions: Tennessee Technological University

Michael M. Gunter is a professor of political science at Tennessee Technological University in Cookeville, Tennessee and considered an authority on the Kurds in Turkey, Iraq, Syria, and Iran. Brendan O'Leary referred to Gunter as, "The doyen of Kurdish political studies in the United States," while Martin van Bruinessen wrote that Gunter is "probably the most prolific of today's scholars of Kurdish politics." Gunter has written or edited more than 15 books on the Kurdish struggle and two more criticized for promoting Armenian genocide denial. Two of those books on the Kurds were among the first analyses in English in modern times of the Kurdish unrest in the Middle East. In writing his analyses, Gunter has worked directly with top Kurdish and other Middle Eastern political leaders. He received the Kurdish Human Rights Watch's Service to the Kurds Award in 1998. "Gunter's analyses and writings sometimes strike readers as controversial, but he says his views are often based on information that hasn't yet been made public." He has served as the secretary-general of the EU Turkey Civic Commission (EUTCC), an NGO in Brussels that lobbies the EU parliament on behalf of the Kurds since 2009. He is a member of the Board of Advisory Editors of The Middle East Journal, The Journal of South Asian and Middle Eastern Studies, and The International Journal of Turkish Studies, among others.

== Education ==
Gunter earned his B.A. in American history in 1964 from Columbia University, his M.I.A. from Columbia's School of International and Public Affairs in 1966, and his Ph.D. in international relations from Kent State University in 1972.

== Teaching experience ==
Gunter taught at Kent State from 1967 to 1971. Since 1972, Gunter has taught political science at Tennessee Tech University. He was an assistant professor from 1972 to 1976, an associate professor from 1976 to 1981, and a professor since 1981. He won the university's Caplenor Faculty Research Award in 1995–1996 and the Outstanding Teaching Award in 1999–2000. He is only the second faculty member in Tennessee Tech's history to win both of these awards.

He was also a Senior Fulbright-Hays Lecturer in international relations at Middle East Technical University in Ankara, Turkey from 1978 to 1979. He was an instructor of ESL and American Culture at Shanghai Xuhui Education College in Shanghai, China during the summer of 2001. He was an adjunct professor for Fisk University in the fall of 2002. He was a visiting professor for The International University in Vienna, Austria during the summers of 2002 and 2003, where he won the Distinguished Visiting Professor Award in 2003. He also taught courses on Kurdish and Middle Eastern politics, among others, for the U.S. Government Areas Studies Program and U.S. Department of State Foreign Service Institute in Washington, D.C. Since 2018, he has been a Distinguished Professor of the Centre for Turkish Studies of Shaanxi Normal University, in Xi'an, China.

== Recent publications ==
- The Kurds in the Middle East: Enduring Problems and New Dynamics, co-ed., 2020
- Kurdish Autonomy and U.S. Foreign Policy, co-ed., 2020
- The Kurds: A Divided Nation in Search of a State, 3rd ed., 2019
- Routledge Handbook on the Kurds, ed., 2019
- Historical Dictionary of the Kurds, 3rd ed., 2018
- The Kurds, a Modern History, 2016
- Kurdish Issues: Essays in Honor of Robert W. Olson, ed., 2016
- Out of Nowhere, The Kurds of Syria in Peace and War, 2014
- Earlier, Gunter published many other books and over 200 scholarly journal articles and book chapters.

== Controversies ==
Gunter has been criticized for denying the Armenian genocide and claiming that Armenians are responsible for "provoking" their own persecution. His book Armenian History and the Question of Genocide was described as "a very badly written and poorly argued volume" by historian Richard Hovannisian. Genocide scholar Israel W. Charny was extremely harsh in a review, stating:

This book should be studied by all students of [genocide] denial for its artful stratagems of sounding fair, acting fairly, citing scholarship that covers divergent and contradictory points of view, speaking consistently softly, and of course calling for justice and peace, all in the course of organizing a disarming, deceitful, anti-history and anti-value-of-life work that should frighten anybody who is concerned with integrity in intellectual and scholarly works, and genuine valuing of human life.

Historian Steven A. Usitalo largely agrees, noting how the work is "empirically and interpretively flawed" and wonders how Palgrave Macmillan published it as historical scholarship. He states that:

[The book is] neither a re-reading of the now-vast secondary literature nor a fresh study of previously misunderstood or unknown archival documentation (the author seems unequipped linguistically for the latter task). Rather, it offers yet one more return to the argument that Robert Melson aptly criticized as the "provocation thesis."

The book was partially funded by Turkish Coalition of America. He published a positive review of Guenter Lewy's book The Armenian Massacres in Ottoman Turkey after having blurbed it, raising criticism of professional integrity.
