= Ilhan Selçuk and the Enlightenment Instigators of the Republic Monument =

Coordinates: 41.07558°N 29.02764°E

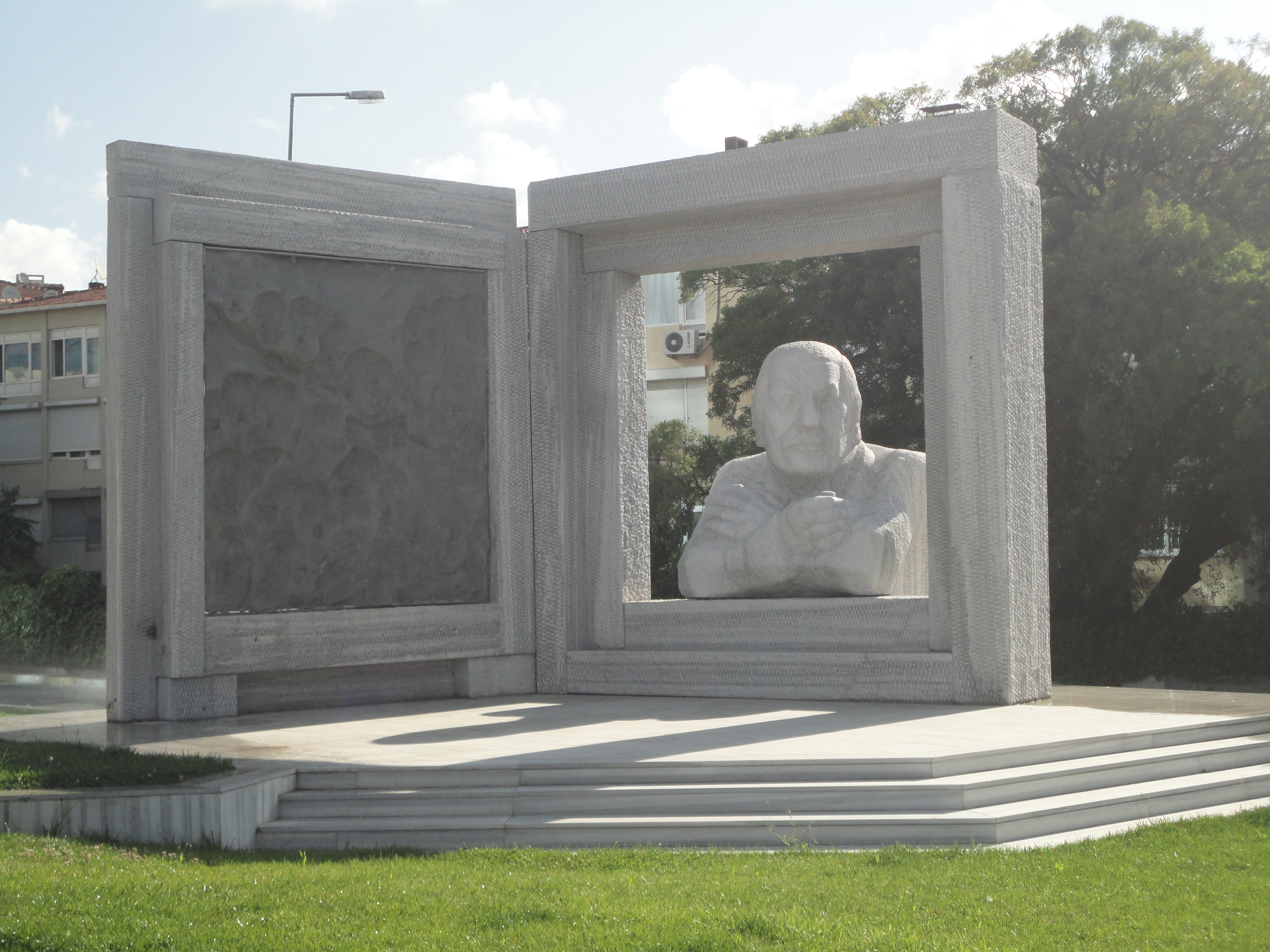
Ilhan Selçuk and the Enlightenment Instigators of the Republic Monument, front view

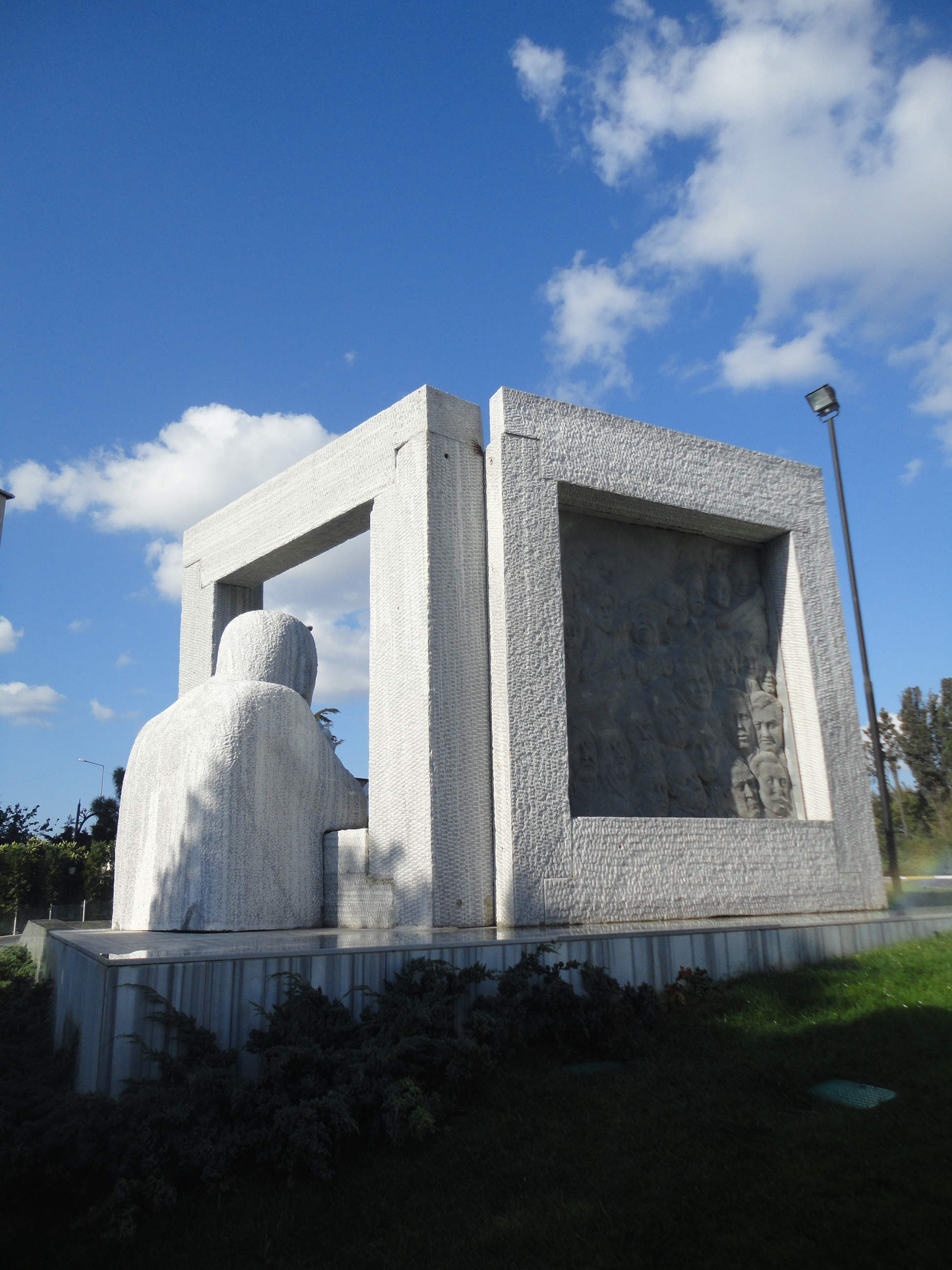
Ilhan Selçuk and the Enlightenment Instigators of the Republic Monument, rear view

The Ilhan Selçuk and the Enlightenment Instigators of the Republic Monument or (Turkish: İlhan Selçuk ve Cumhuriyet Aydınlanmasını Yaratanlar Anıtı), is a memorial outdoor sculpture commemorating journalist İlhan Selçuk (1925–2010) created by sculptor Mehmet Aksoy.

The grand opening of the monument took place on 21 June 2012, the second death anniversary of the journalist. Due to being close to İlhan Selçuk's home, it was placed at the intersection at the head of the hill going down from Ulus to Arnavutköy in Istanbul.

The sculpture is 5 m (16 ft) high and 10 m (33 ft) wide. Together with İlhan Selçuk's sculpture, reliefs of other prominent Turkish figures like Aziz Nesin (1915–1995), Cevat Şakir Kabaağaçlı (1886–1973), Hasan Âli Yücel (1897–1961), İsmail Hakkı Tonguç (1893–1960), Mustafa Kemal Atatürk (1881–1938), Mîna Urgan (1916–2000), Muazzez İlmiye Çığ (1914–2024), Nâzım Hikmet (1902–1963), Tevfik Fikret (1867–1915), Turhan Selçuk (1922–2010), Uğur Mumcu (1942–1993) can be found on the monument. İlhan Selçuk, is figured in a corner of the Cumhuriyet newspaper where, he is looking through the window, where his signature is.

== See also ==
- List of public art in Istanbul
