= Gündüz Aktan =

Turkish diplomat and politician (1941–2008)

Ambassador of Turkey to Japan
- In office 1996–1998

Ambassador of Turkey to Greece
- In office 1988–1991

Ambassador of Turkey to Switzerland
- In office 1983–1985

Ambassador of Turkey to Kenya
- In office 1973–1975

Personal details
- Born: Gündüz Suphi Aktan; 7 August 1941 Safranbolu, Karabük, Turkey
- Died: 19 November 2008 (aged 67) Ankara, Turkey
- Resting place: Büyükada cemetery, Istanbul, Turkey
- Spouse: Ülkü Aktan
- Children: 2
- Education: Ankara University

Gündüz Aktan (1941–2008) was a Turkish diplomat and politician. He held various diplomatic posts, including ambassador of Turkey to Greece and ambassador of Turkey to Japan. After leaving diplomatic post he joined the Nationalist Movement Party and was elected to the Turkish Parliament in 2007. He served as a deputy for one year until his death in November 2008.

== Early life and education ==
Aktan was born in Safranbolu on 7 August 1941. His father, Bekir Suphi Aktan, was a governor. He graduated from the Faculty of Political Sciences of Ankara University in 1962.

== Career ==
Following his graduation Aktan worked at the Ministry of Interior. He joined the Ministry of Foreign Affairs in 1967. He was the permanent representative of Turkey at OECD in Paris between 1970 and 1973. He was the ambassador of Turkey to Kenya from 1973 to 1975. He was the permanent representative of Turkey at the United Nations in New York City between 1977 and 1981. He was appointed ambassador of Turkey to Switzerland in 1983 and remained in office until 1985. Next he served as an advisor to Prime Minister Turgut Özal from 1985 to 1988 and as ambassador of Turkey to Greece from 1988 to 1991. He was the head of the Turkish delegation to the United Nations in Geneva between 1991 and 1995. He was named as the vice undersecretary of the Ministry of Foreign Affairs in charge of political affairs in 1995 and served in the post for one year. He was the ambassador of Turkey to Japan from 1996 to 1998.

Aktan retired from diplomatic post in 1998 and headed the Turkish Economic and Social Studies Foundation. He wrote opinion columns for the Radikal newspaper between 1998 and June 2007. He was a member of the Turkish Armenian Reconciliation Commission. He was appointed chair of the ASAM: Eurasian Center for Strategic Studies on 1 April 2004 and held the post until September 2004.

Aktan joined the Nationalist Movement Party and was elected as a deputy from Istanbul in the general election of 2007.

== Personal life and death ==
Aktan was married to Ülkü Aktan and had two children, a daughter and a son.

Aktan was hospitalized due to heart failure in the early November 2008. He died at Akay Hospital in Ankara on 19 November 2008. Funeral prayers for him were performed in Kocatepe Mosque, Ankara, on 20 November, and he was buried Büyükada cemetery, Istanbul.

The Ministry of Foreign Affairs published a book in memory of Aktan in 2013.
