= Ottoman Armenians During the Decline of the Empire =

2005 conference

Ottoman Armenians During the Decline of the Empire: Issues of Scientific Responsibility and Democracy was a conference on the Armenian genocide held from 24 to 25 September 2005 at Bilgi University in Istanbul, jointly organized by Bilgi, Boğaziçi University, and Sabancı University. The first conference to challenge Armenian genocide denial in Turkey, it was initially scheduled to be held in May 2005 at Boğaziçi, but was postponed due to a judicial ban on the conference.
