= Esat Uras =

Turkish politician

Ahmet Esat Uras (1882–1957) was a perpetrator of the Armenian genocide who later wrote The Armenians in History and the Armenian Question (1950), an apologist work which has been described as "the ur-text of Turkish denialist 'scholarship'".

== Biography ==
Uras was a senior official in the Committee of Union and Progress "directorate for public security", heading the "Armenian bureau" due to his ability to read the Armenian language. In this capacity, he played a key role in planning and executing the Armenian genocide. Uras was likely the chief editor of The Armenian Aspirations and Revolutionary Movements, published in early 1916, in which the Ottoman government attempted to justify its policies towards Armenians. In May 1916, he went to Aleppo and personally coordinated deportations of the remaining Armenians.

In the Republic of Turkey, he joined the Republican People's Party and served as a backbench MP for Amasya for decades. He also participated in the Turkish Historical Society.

== Writings ==
By 1950, Uras was one of the last surviving Unionist leaders. He published The Armenians in History and the Armenian Question (Turkish: Tarihte Ermeniler ve Ermeni Meselesi), probably in reaction to Stalin's post-World War II territorial claims on Turkey. According to Turkish historian Doğan Gürpınar, the book was "a new and comprehensive synthesis" of older Unionist claims and apologetics; it also built on Uras' personal experiences. Gürpınar sees the book as "the intermediary connecting two historical eras and two different modes of denialism", the latter being that which developed after 1973. The book has been described as "the ur-text of Turkish denialist 'scholarship'", since it established many of the tropes and narratives that would be used in later works that denied the genocide. According to Donald Bloxham, the book is "the canonical text of Turkish nationalist historiography on the Armenians". The book has been widely criticized for misrepresenting sources and exaggerating Armenian rebelliousness.

Historian Dikran Kaligian states that Uras' work is the main source for those historians who argue that the Armenian Revolutionary Federation fomented a civil war on behalf of Russia. This "provocation thesis" aims to justify the genocide by asserting that Armenians provoked their own persecution. Kaligian states that Uras' book is an unreliable source that "is replete with mistranslations and distortions as well as key omissions", for example mistranslating a speech by Vahan Papazian and omitting the passages that contradict Uras' argument.

== Sources ==
- Göçek, Fatma Müge (2011). "Reading Genocide: Turkish Historiography on 1915". In Suny, Ronald Grigor; Göçek, Fatma Müge; Naimark, Norman M. (eds.). A Question of Genocide: Armenians and Turks at the End of the Ottoman Empire. Oxford University Press. pp. 42–52. ISBN 978-0-19-979276-4.
- Gürpınar, Doğan (2016). "The manufacturing of denial: the making of the Turkish 'official thesis' on the Armenian Genocide between 1974 and 1990". Journal of Balkan and Near Eastern Studies. 18 (3): 217–240. doi:10.1080/19448953.2016.1176397. S2CID 148518678.
- Kaligian, Dikran (2014). "Anatomy of Denial: Manipulating Sources and Manufacturing a Rebellion". Genocide Studies International. 8 (2): 208–223. doi:10.3138/gsi.8.2.06. S2CID 154744150.
- Mamigonian, Marc A. (2015). "Academic Denial of the Armenian Genocide in American Scholarship: Denialism as Manufactured Controversy". Genocide Studies International. 9 (1): 61–82. doi:10.3138/gsi.9.1.04. S2CID 154623321.
