= Center for Eurasian Strategic Studies =

Turkish think tank

Center for Eurasian Strategic Studies or CESS (Avrasya Stratejik Araştırmalar Merkezi, ASAM) is a Turkish think tank organization which studies about politics, economics, international relations, history security, demography, law and technology. It was founded by Turkish politician and academician Ümit Özdağ in 1999. Being the first think tank organization of Turkey, CESS especially studies about Turkey and Turkey's neighbors. CESS aims to create a national security strategy and awareness about geopolitics.

CESS has published several books, articles and studies since its founding. In 2000, CESS started to publish a monthly journal called Strategical Analysis (Stratejik Analiz). In 2001, CESS founded a unique organisation called Institution of Armenian Studies (Ermeni Araştırmaları Enstitüsü) and same year, the organisation started to publish a new journal called Review of Armenian Studies (Ermeni Çalışmalarının İncelenmesi) . With this institution, CESS aims to disproof the ideological and controversial Armenian theories about Turkey and Azerbaijan. In 2006, CESS founded another organisation called Institution of Crimes Against Humanity (İnsanlığa Karşı Suçlar Enstitüsü).
