= Ömer Engin Lütem =

Turkish diplomat (1933–2018)

His Excellency Ömer Engin Lütem
- Born: 1933; Istanbul, Turkey
- Died: 6 January 2018 (aged 84–85)
- Education: University of Ankara
- Occupations: Diplomat and writer
- Relatives: Ambassador Murat Lütem
- Writing career
- Language: English and Turkish
- Years active: 1998-2018

Ömer Engin Lütem (1933, Istanbul, Turkey - 6 January 2018) was a Turkish writer, diplomat, researcher and lecturer.

== Life ==
=== Education ===
Ambassador Ömer Engin Lütem graduated from Galatasaray High School, then studied Political Sciences at Ankara University in 1957 and started his career as a diplomat in the same year.

=== Ministry of Foreign Affairs ===
He held different positions in the Ministry of Foreign Affairs during his service. Some of his duties included Consul General at Cologne, Germany between 1975 and 1979, Director General of Intelligence and Research from 1981 until 1983. Also he had four high-level diplomatic posts; Ambassador to Bulgaria (1983 - 1989), Deputy Undersecretary of the Ministry (1989 - 1992), Ambassador to Vatican (1992 - 1995) and the Permanent Representative to UNESCO (1995 - 1997).

=== Post-retirement ===
Lütem retired in 1998 and served as the Director of the Institute for Armenian Research at Eurasian Strategic Research Center (2000 - 2008) and Director of the Center for Eurasian Studies (2009 - 2012). He was also the editor in chief of the journals Armenian Studies, Review of Armenian Studies, and International Crimes and History.

Lütem died on 6 January 2018.

== Writing Works ==
- Turkish-Bulgarian Relations, 1983 - 1989 Volume 1, ASAM, Ankara, 2000
- Balkan Diplomacy, ASAM, Ankara 2001
- Handbook of the Armenian Question, ASAM-TEİMK, Ankara, 2003
- Turkish-Bulgarian Relations, 1983 - 1989 Volume 2, ASAM, Ankara, 2005
- Armenian Terror, ASAM, Ankara, 2007
- Armenian Question: Basic Knowledge and Documentation, AVİM, Ankara, 2009

== See also ==
Center for Eurasian Studies

Ömer Engin Lütem's Articles for AVIM

Institute of Armenian Research
