= Colby Mitchell Chester =

United States Navy admiral (1844–1932)

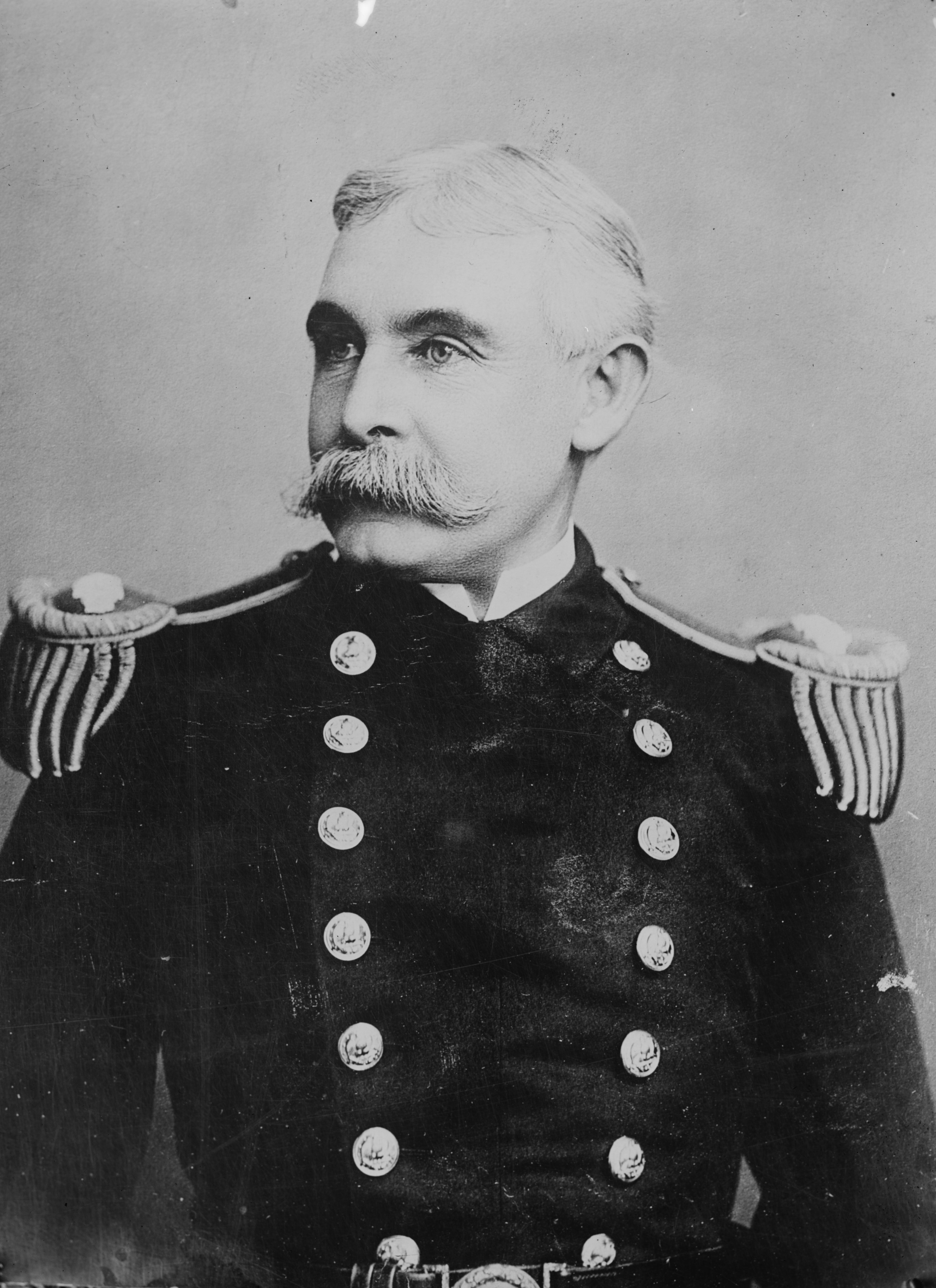
- Rear Admiral Chester, 1900
- Born: February 29, 1844; New London, Connecticut, U.S.
- Died: May 4, 1932 (aged 88); Rye, New York, U.S.
- Burial place: Arlington National Cemetery
- Military career
- Allegiance: United States
- Branch: United States Navy
- Service years: 1863–1909, 1917
- Rank: Rear admiral
- Commands: Cincinnati; Kentucky
- Conflicts: American Civil War; Spanish–American War; World War I

Colby Mitchell Chester (February 29, 1844 – May 4, 1932) was a United States Navy admiral. He is the only naval officer to have actively served in the Civil War, the Spanish–American War, and World War I.

== Early life ==
Chester was born in New London, Connecticut, on 29 February 1844, and graduated from the United States Naval Academy in 1863.

== Military career ==
In 1864, Chester participated in operations against Mobile, Alabama, aboard the Richmond, part of the squadron commanded by Admiral David G. Farragut. He served in the Navy for 46 more years.

He was Commandant of Cadets at the United States Naval Academy in 1891–94; commanded the Cincinnati, flagship of the South Atlantic squadron during the Spanish–American War; became commanding officer of Kentucky upon her commissioning on May 15, 1900, until 1901, and became superintendent of the U.S. Naval Observatory in 1902, and retired on February 28, 1906.

Chester's active-service record was extended to February 28, 1909, to round out a full 50-year service career with the U.S. Navy. He was recalled to special duty in 1917, during World War I, as the first commandant of the Navy ROTC units at Yale University and Brown University.

In 1923 he traveled to Turkey at the head of the Americans who participated in an agreement called the Chester concession.

== Personal life and family ==
Chester married Melancia Antoinette Tremaine (1847–1923) in 1873. They had at least one child, Colby Mitchell Chester Jr. (1877–1965), the first president of General Foods (originally the Postum Cereal Company) from 1924 to 1935 and later chairman of the board from 1935 to 1943.

Chester died in Rye, New York in 1932 and is buried at Arlington National Cemetery.
