= Chester concession =

Treaty proposed by Turkey, rejected by U.S.

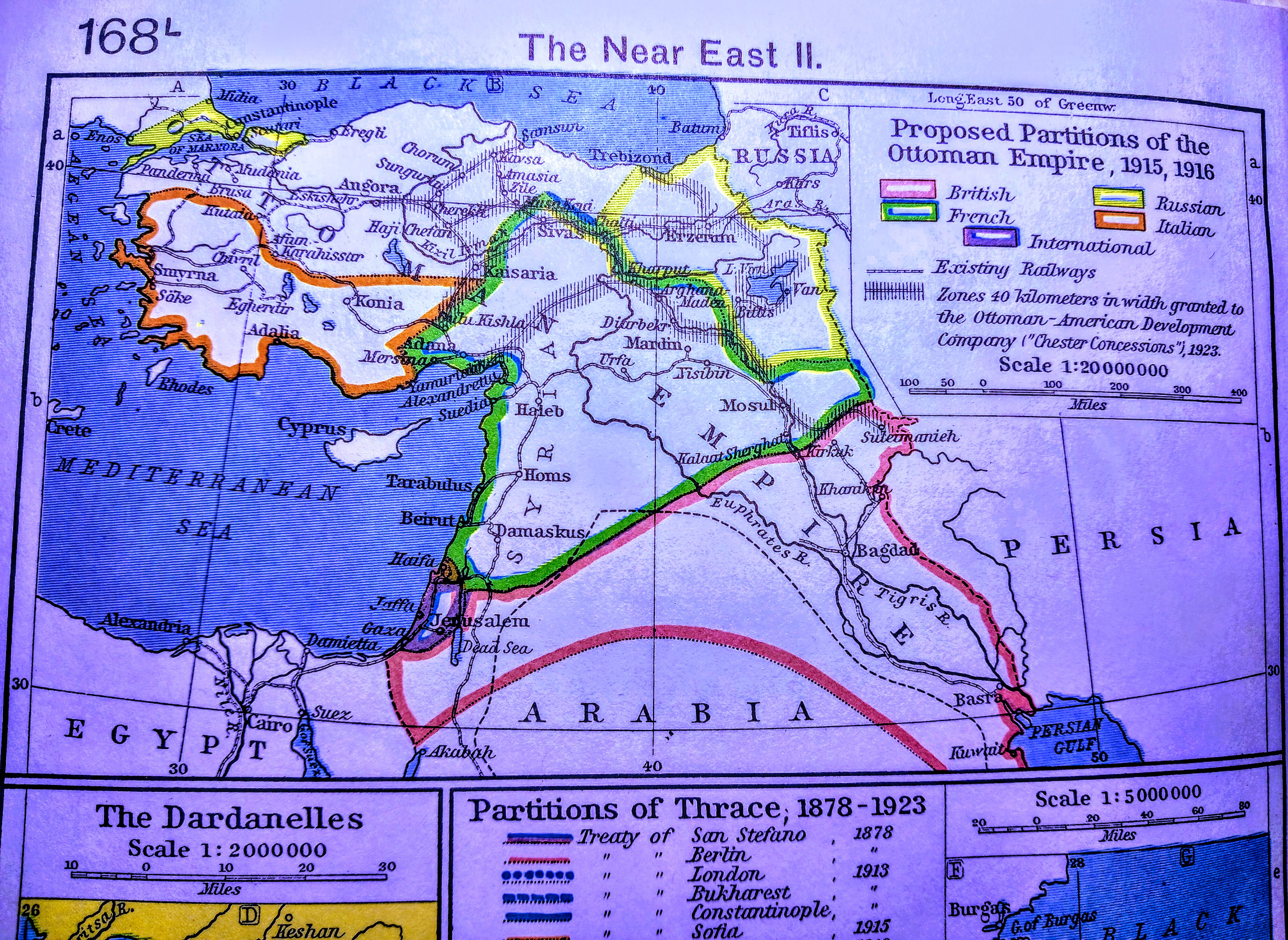
Chester Concessions 1923, William R. Shepherd's World Atlas

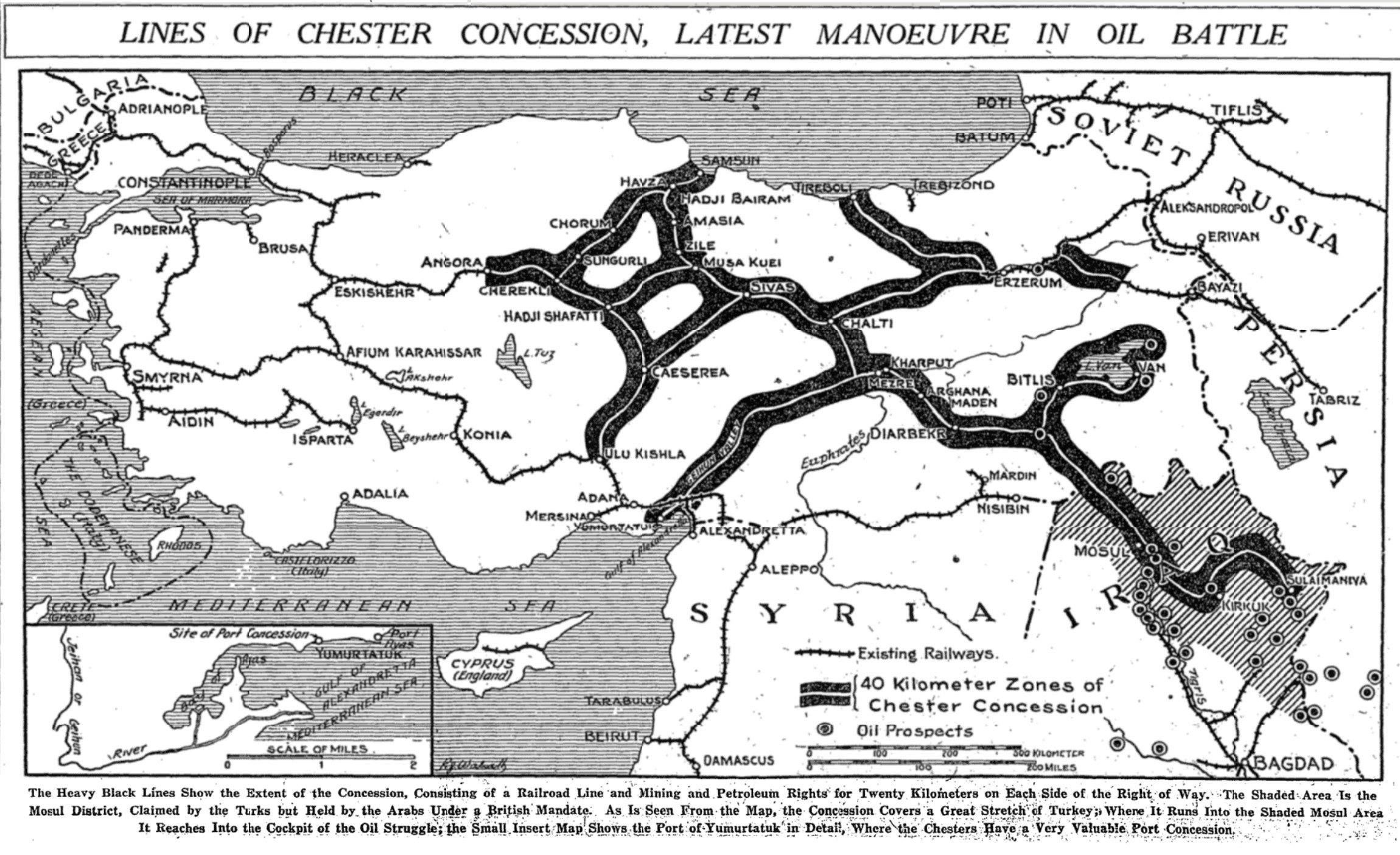
Map from May 1923, Asia magazine

The Chester concession, approved by the parliament of the newly founded Republic of Turkey on April 10, 1923, would have allowed United States development of oil and railways. The United States Senate refused to ratify the treaty, and consequently Turkey annulled the concession.

It was an award of significant importance and marked the introduction of U.S. capital for the first time on a large scale into the Near East. The same type of agreement (Baghdad Railway) was a major cause of the anxiety that led the Ottoman Empire to World War I. Germany had obtained concessions from Ottoman Empire that allowed German companies to construct railways.

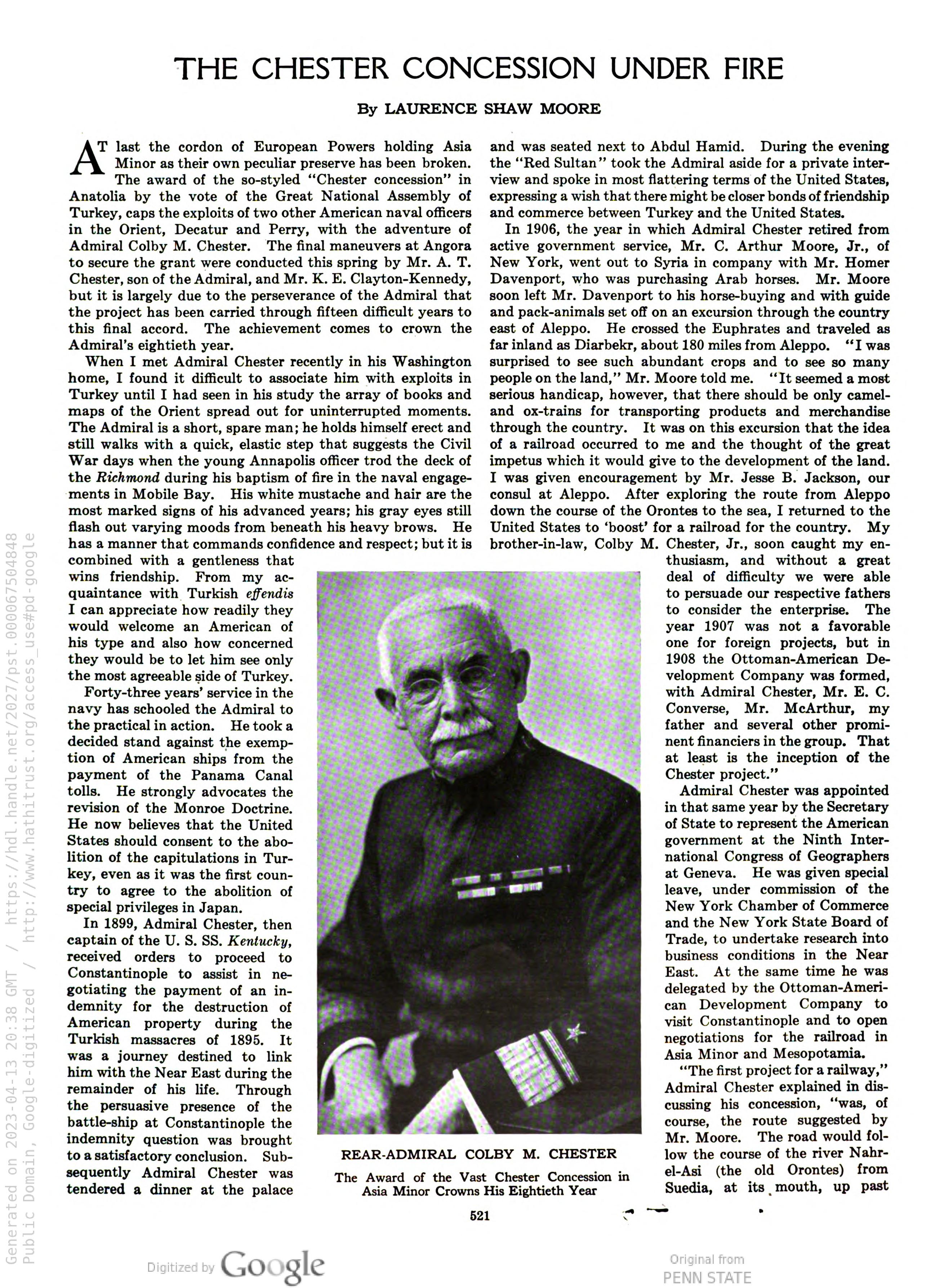
Article in May 1923, Asia magazine

The U.S. corporation would have the rights to all the mineral resources, including oil fields, found within a 20-kilometer zone on each side of the railway lines, as well as the privilege of carrying on subsidiary activities such as the laying of pipelines, the utilization of water power for construction, and the building of port and terminal facilities on the Black Sea and the Gulf of Alexandretta. The corporation could utilize the resources of the public lands, including sandpits, gravel pits, quarries and timber, without compensation and was granted exemption from taxation. Retired Rear-Admiral Colby Mitchell Chester led the U.S. syndicate, thus the name Chester concession was employed, although the official name of the syndicate was the Ottoman-American Development Company.

Despite the Turkish government's desire to be free of foreign economic influence (which had caused their Ottoman predecessors a great loss of autonomy), the concession was approved because it would guarantee U.S. support at the Treaty of Lausanne, where negotiations were taking place regarding the relationship between the new Turkish state and the European powers. Also a factor was the Turkish government's pragmatic need to develop, which overwhelmed fears of imperialism. The railroad grant applied to an extension of the old Anatolian Railway from Ankara to Sivas, with a branch to the port of Samsun on the Black Sea; a line from Sivas to Erzurum and thence on to the Persian and Russian frontiers, with branches to the Black Sea ports of Tirebolu and Trebizond (now Trabzon); a line from Ulukışla on the Baghdad Railway to Sivas via Kayseri; a railway from Sivas to Harput and thence to Mosul with branches to Bitlis and Van; and a railway from Harput to Yumurtalık, a port on the Gulf of Iskenderun.

It was estimated that $300,000,000 would be needed to carry the plan through. The deal collapsed in part because of financing problems on the U.S. side, and in part, because it called for the development of rail into the Basra province, which did not come under Turkish control (Basra became part of the British mandate), and the British-controlled Turkish Petroleum Company. The French Foreign Office, on behalf of nationals with whose claims the Chester grant conflicted, despatched a note to the Ankara government in which it characterized the whole procedure as being deliberately unfriendly. In 1923, the Ankara Assembly abruptly declared that the concession had lapsed, owing to failure of the concessionaires to fulfill in the allotted time certain conditions of the grant; but Kenneth Edgar Clayton-Kennedy, as the representative of the syndicate, went to Ankara in person and, it was reported in 1924, succeeded in reopening the question.

== Armenian genocide denial ==
Turkish officials used the concession to mend Turkey's negative image deriving from the recent Armenian genocide. In 1922, Chester published an article arguing that the Christians of Anatolia were not murdered.
