= Turkish Armenian Reconciliation Commission =

The Turkish Armenian Reconciliation Commission was made in 2001 to help Turkey and Armenia be closer. The main goal was to make the governments more active.

In February 2002 an independent legal opinion commissioned by the International Center for Transitional Justice, at the request of Turkish Armenian Reconciliation Commission, concluded that the Ottoman Genocide of Armenians in 1915–1918 "include[d] all of the elements of the crime of genocide as defined in the [Genocide] Convention, and legal scholars as well as historians, politicians, journalists and other people would be justified in continuing to so describe them".

== Members ==
- Gündüz Aktan (Ankara) - resigned June 2003
- Alexander Arzoumanian (Yerevan)
- Üstün Ergüder (Istanbul)
- Sadi Ergüvenc (Istanbul) - resigned June 2003
- David Hovhannissian (Yerevan)
- Van Krikorian (New York)
- Andranik Migranian (Moscow)
- Özdem Sanberk (Istanbul) - resigned June 2003
- İlter Türkmen (Istanbul)
- Vamik Volkan (Charlottesville)

Newer Members (2003-2004)

- Emin Mahir Balcioglu (Geneva)
- Ahmet Evin (Istanbul)
- Ersin Kalaycıoğlu (Istanbul)
- Şule Kut (Istanbul)
- İlter Turan (Istanbul)
