= Separate opinion =

Term used by the European Court of Human Rights

Separate opinion is a term used by the European Court of Human Rights for both concurring opinion and dissenting opinion.
