= Mehmet Aksoy (sculptor) =

Turkish sculptor (born 1939)

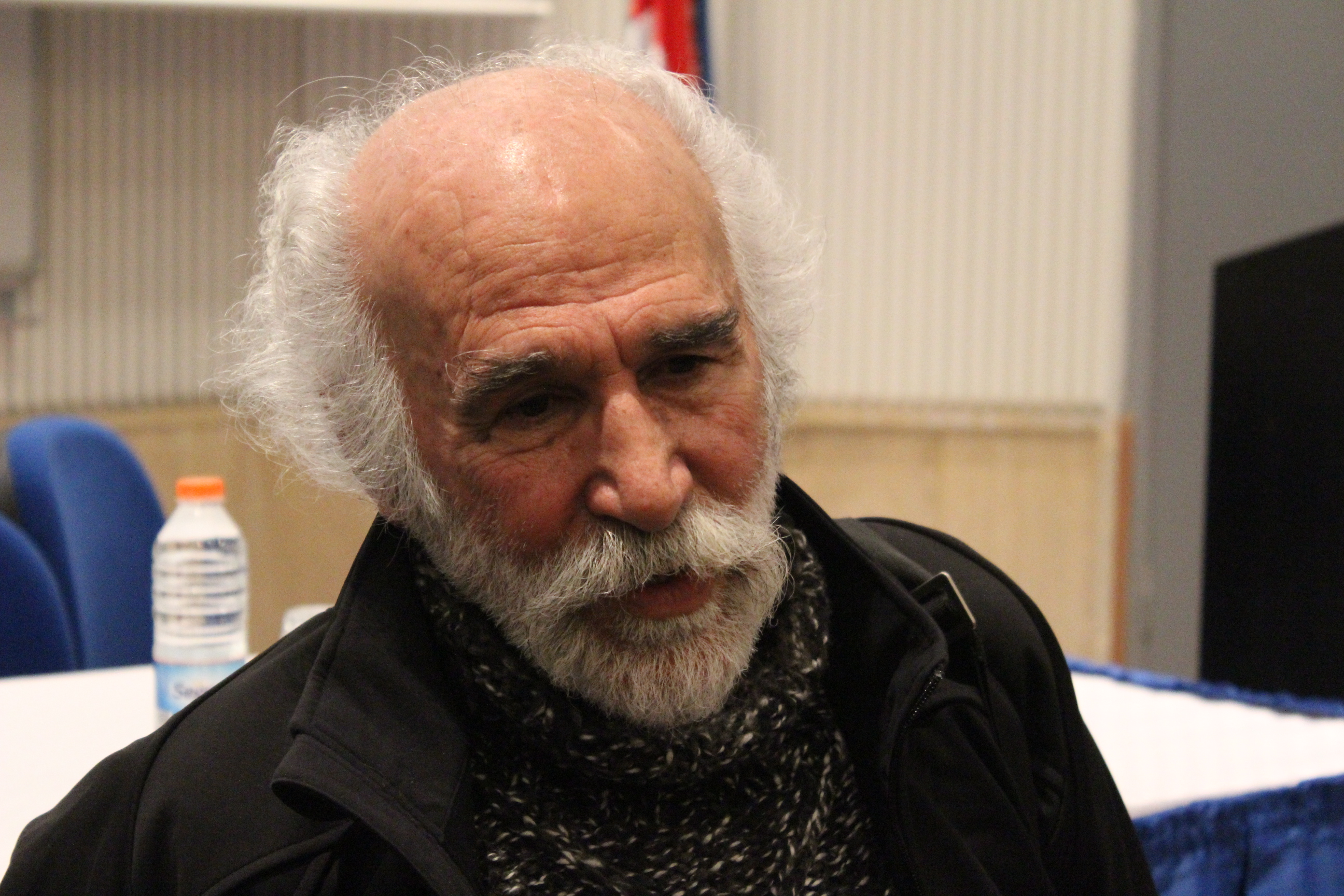
- Aksoy during an event in Bilkent University, March 2012.
- Born: May 15, 1939 (age 86); Kessab, Syria
- Education: Mimar Sinan Fine Arts University, Hochschule der Künste in Berlin
- Known for: Sculpture
- Notable work: Memorial to the Deserter, Potsdam, Germany; Statue of Humanity, Kars, Turkey

Mehmet Aksoy (born 15 May 1939) is a Turkish sculptor. His sculptures often contain sensual figurative elements, but he is strongly rooted in a modernist sensibility with strong conceptual and abstract elements in his work. He works primarily in stone but also incorporates other material, fusing metal or differing stones in a single sculpture. He presently resides and works in a studio of his own dramatic design on the outskirts of Istanbul.

== Early life ==
He was born 1939 in Kessab, a town in northwestern Syria close to the Turkish border to a family of Turkmen origin. After completing his primary education in Yayladağı in Hatay Province, Tarsus, Mersin and Antalya, he enrolled 1960 in Istanbul Academy of Fine Arts (today Mimar Sinan Fine Arts University) to study painting. Later, Aksoy switched over to sculpture section, where he was educated by Prof. Şadi Çalık between 1961 and 1967. Following his military service, he served at the same academy as an assistant in 1969/1970. He went in 1970 to London after having received a state-granted scholarship for further studies. Aksoy moved to Germany to study at the Hochschule der Künste in Berlin, from where he obtained a master's degree in 1977. He returned in 1978 to Turkey and served until 1980 as an instructor at his alma mater.

== Works ==
=== Statue of Humanity ===
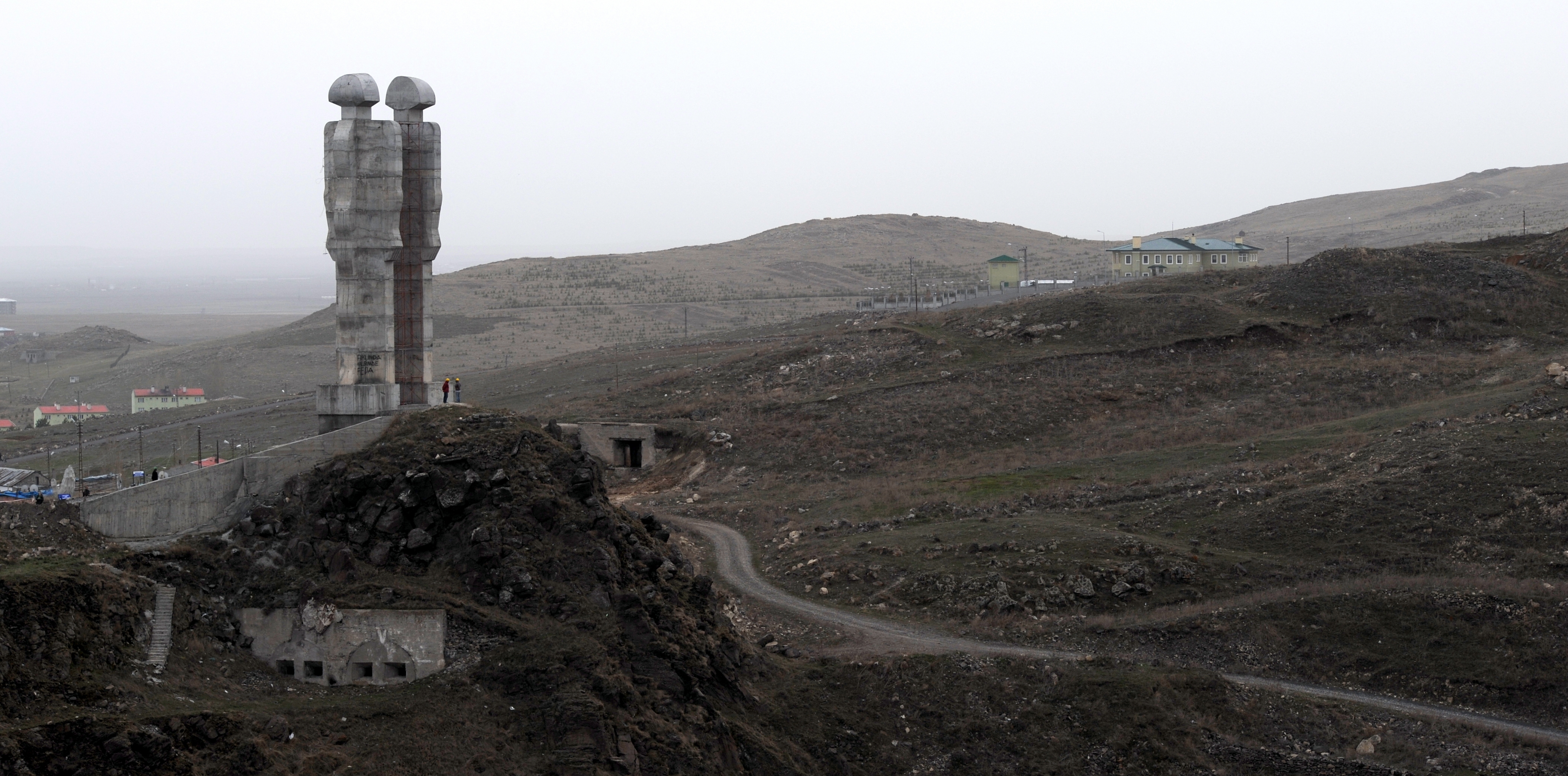
Statue of Humanity (2009) under construction in Kars

Statue of Humanity (Turkish: İnsanlık Anıtı, Armenian: Մարդկության հուշարձան) was a statue under construction in Kars, Turkey created by Mehmet Aksoy. The monument, depicting two human figures reaching out hands to each other, stood 30 m (98 ft) high on Kazıktepe Hill across from the ancient Castle of Kars outside of the city and would have been visible from neighboring Armenia when completed. It was commissioned by Naif Alibeyoğlu, the former mayor of Kars, as a gesture of reconciliation in Armenia–Turkey relations following a 2009 accord to establish formal diplomatic recognition between the two.

Turkish Prime Minister Recep Tayyip Erdoğan described the monument as a "freak" (Turkish: ucube) during a visit to Kars in January 2011. In spite of protests, the city authority decided to remove the statue. In April 2011, works began to demolish it. Erdoğan insists that this was merely a question of aesthetics, yet according to The Economist the demolition could have been an attempt to appeal to nationalist sentiment ahead of the 2011 general election. As a response to Erdoğan's comments, Aksoy filed a lawsuit against Erdoğan for insulting him. In March 2015, a court fined Erdoğan 10,000 Turkish lira for calling the work a "freak". Erdoğan's lawyer claimed it was a critique rather than an insult. However local court later on overturned that verdict. After this Aksoy famously stated he would not spend the "dirty money" (haram money) and would instead use it to throw a party for his friends, which led to a second lawsuit where he was accused of insulting the President. Later on he was acquitted by the Istanbul court.

=== Memorial to the Deserter ===
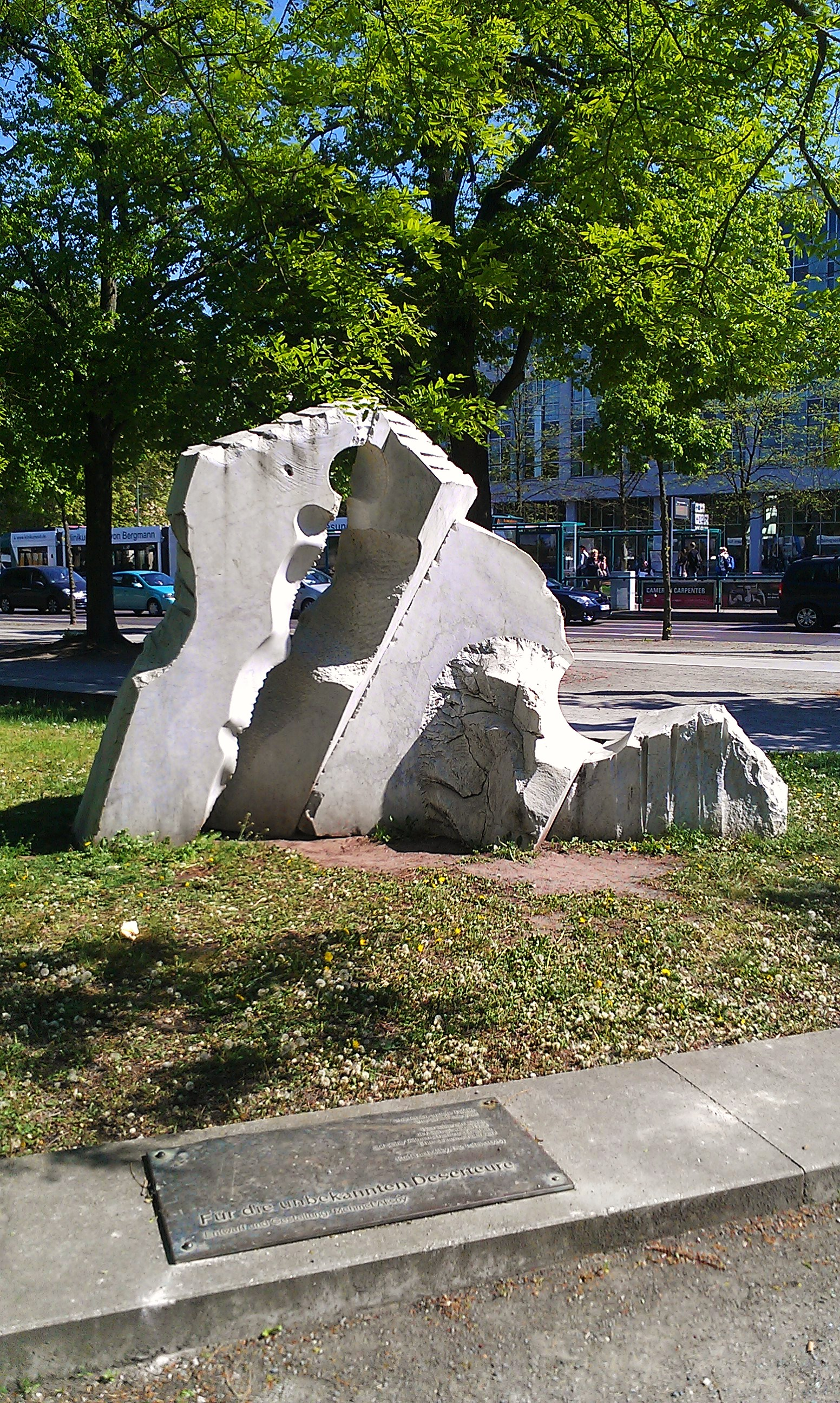
Memorial to the Unknown Deserter (1989) in Potsdam

Memorial to the Deserter (Turkish: İnsanlık Anıtı) is a statue in Unity Square, Potsdam, Germany created by Mehmet Aksoy. The figure in this memorial, which honors those who refuse to fight in unjust wars, is carved in negative relief, a technique that Aksoy employed in later work.

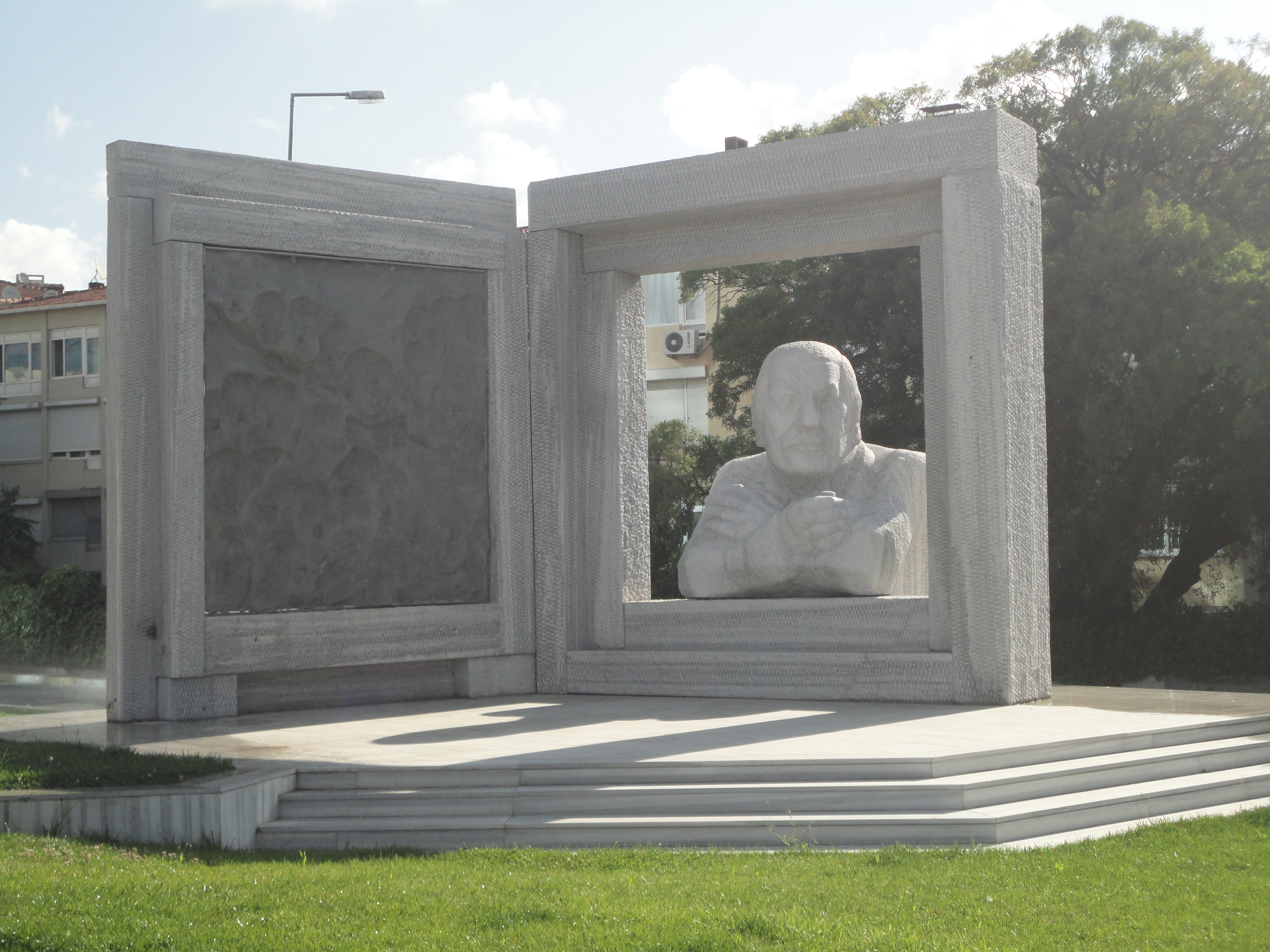
Ilhan Selçuk and the Enlightenment Instigators of the Republic Monument, front view

== Personal life ==
Aksoy lost his brother, sister-in-law, and nibling in 2023 Turkey–Syria earthquake.
