= Doğan Gürpınar =

Turkish historian

Doğan Gürpınar is a Turkish historian whose work focuses on the late Ottoman Empire and the Republic of Turkey. He is employed by Istanbul Technical University.

== Works ==
- Gürpınar, Doğan (2013). Ottoman Imperial Diplomacy: A Political, Social and Cultural History. Bloomsbury Publishing. ISBN 978-0-85773-456-3.
- Gürpınar, Doğan (2013). Ottoman/Turkish Visions of the Nation, 1860-1950. Springer. ISBN 978-1-137-33421-3.
- Gürpınar, Doğan (2014). Komplolar kitabı: belki de her şey göründüğü gibidir (in Turkish). Doğan Kitap. ISBN 978-605-09-2090-1.
- Gürpınar, Doğan (2019). Conspiracy Theories in Turkey: Conspiracy Nation. Routledge. ISBN 978-0-429-67046-6.
