= The Pedagogical State =

Book by Sam Kaplan

The Pedagogical State: Education and the Politics of National Culture in Post-1980 Turkey
- Author: Sam Kaplan
- Language: English
- Genre: Non-fiction
- Publisher: Stanford University Press
- Publication date: 2006
- Publication place: United States

The Pedagogical State: Education and the Politics of National Culture in Post-1980 Turkey (2006) is a Stanford University Press book by anthropologist Sam Kaplan about influences on Turkey's educational curriculum, based on fieldwork in the village of Yayla.

== See also ==
- Education
- Pedagogy
