= Ottoman casualties of World War I =

Civilian and military casualties

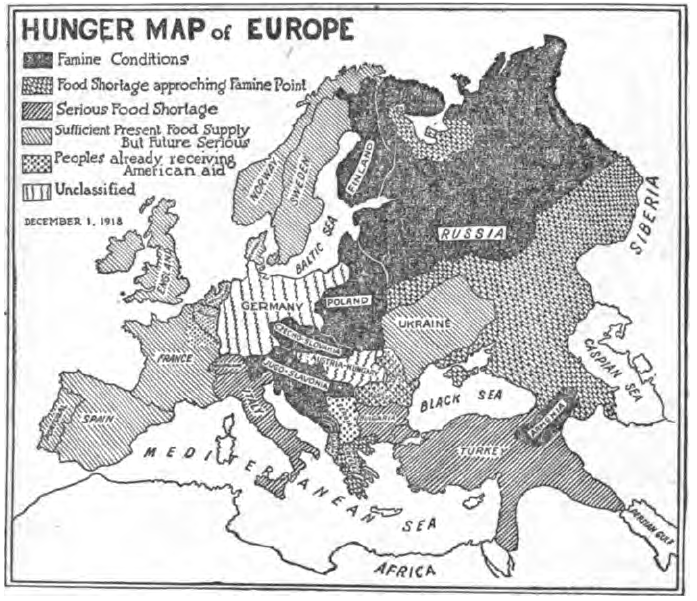
"Hunger Map of Europe", published in December 1918, indicates serious food shortages in most of the territories of the Ottoman Empire, and famine in the eastern parts.

Ottoman casualties of World War I were the civilian and military casualties sustained by the Ottoman Empire during the First World War. Almost 1.5% of the Ottoman population, or approximately 300,000 people of the Empire's 21 million population in 1914, were estimated to have been killed during the war. Of the total 300,000 casualties, 250,000 are estimated to have been military fatalities, with civilian casualties numbering over 50,000. In addition to the 50,000 civilian deaths, an estimated 600,000 to 1.5 million Armenians, 300,000 to 900,000 Greeks, 300,000 Assyrians, and 200,000 Lebanese Maronites were systematically targeted and killed by Turkish authorities either via the military or Kurdish gangs. Likewise, starting in 1916, Ottoman authorities forcibly displaced an estimated 700,000 Kurdish people westward, and an estimated 350,000 died from hunger, exposure, and disease.

The post-war partitioning of the Ottoman Empire, as well as the mass migrations that occurred during and after World War I, made it difficult to estimate the exact number of civilian casualties. However, the figure of military casualties is generally accepted as stated in Edward J. Erickson's Ordered to Die: A History of the Ottoman Army in the First World War.

Disparity exists between Western and Turkish estimations of casualty figures. Analysis of Ottoman statistics by Turkish Dr Kamer Kasim suggests that the total percentage of Ottoman casualties amounted to 26.9% of the Empire's 1914 population. This estimate, however, is greater than numbers reported by Western sources. Kasim has suggested that an additional 399,000 civilian casualties have not been accounted for by Western estimations.

Millets		Prewar		Civilian	Military	Post-War			
	%	1914 census	Other sources			Military perished	Civilian perished	Total perished	Survived
Armenian	16.1%	1,229,227							Unknown
Greeks	19.4%	1.792.206							
Jews	.9%	187,073							
Assyrian	3%								
Others	.9%	186,152							
Muslim	59.7%	12,522,280		9,876,580	2,800,000 (18.6%)	507,152 (5.1% of its group)			
Total: millets	100%	20,975,345				507,152 (2.4% of its group)	4,492,848	5,000,000	

== Ottoman military casualties ==
Until World War I, Istanbul's civilian Muslim population and non-Muslim millets (minorities for some sources) were exempt from the conscription Making exception of the indirect effects of often perennial arrangements, such as those that existed for the labor force of the arsenal and the dockyards. Full conscription was applied in İstanbul for the first time during World War I, and a lasting phraseology describes the Dardanelles Campaign as Turkey having "buried a university in Çanakkale". Non-Muslim Millets (minorities for some sources) were also issued a general call to serve in the military for the first time during World War I in the history of the Empire; but they did not participate in action and served behind the lines. At the end of the war, many families were left with the elderly, children and young widows, see the figure widowhood in Anatolia. Given that the Ottoman Empire was engaged in nearly eight years of continuous warfare (1911–1918 Italo-Turkish War, Balkan Wars, World War I) social disintegration was inevitable.

H. G. Dwight relates witnessing an Ottoman Military burial in Constantinople (modern-day Istanbul) and took pictures of it. H. G. Dwight says that the soldiers were from every nation (ethnicity), but they were only distinguished by their religion, in groups of "Mohammedans" and "Christians". The sermons were performed as based on the count of Bibles, Korans, and Tanakhs in provenance of the battlefield. This is what the caption of one slide reads (on the right):

One officer was left, who made to the grave-diggers and spectators a speech of a moving simplicity. "Brothers," he said, "here are men of every nation – Turks, Albanians, Greeks, Bulgarians, Jews; but they died together, on the same day, fighting under the same flag. Among us, too, are men of every nation, both Mohammedan and Christian; but we also have one flag and we pray to one God. Now, I am going to make a prayer, and when I pray let each one of you pray also, in his own language, in his own way.

When war was declared in Europe in 1914, there was only one military hospital in Van, Turkey, which was soon overcrowded with wounded and sick people. The conditions were extremely bad; There were only two surgeons and no nurses, only male soldiers helping. The conditions on the whole in the Ottoman army were almost bad beyond description. Soldiers, even at the front and who received the best care in comparative terms, were often (a) undernourished, (b) underclothed; troops deployed at high altitude in the mountains of Eastern Anatolia often had only summer clothes; Ottoman soldiers in Palestine often took great risks just to rob the British dead of their boots and even clothing; and (c) largely suffering from diseases (primarily cholera and typhus), which took many more lives than the actual fighting. The German general Friedrich Freiherr Kress von Kressenstein, in a report he wrote to army group headquarters on 20 October 1917, describes how a division (the 24th) that departed from Istanbul-Haydarpaşa Terminal with 10,057 men arrived at the Palestinian Front with only 4,635. 19% of the men had to be admitted to hospitals since they were suffering from various diseases, 24% had deserted and 8% were allocated on the way to various local needs.

Category	Totals
Total number of conscripts and officers mobilized	2,873,000
Killed in action	175,220
Missing in action	61,487
Died of wounds	68,378
Perished from diseases and epidemics	466,759
Dead: Killed in action and other causes	771,844
Seriously wounded (permanent loss, including died of wounds)	303,150
Total wounded in action	763,753
Prisoners of War (combined from all theaters of war)	145,104
Absent without leave	500,000

== Civilian casualties ==
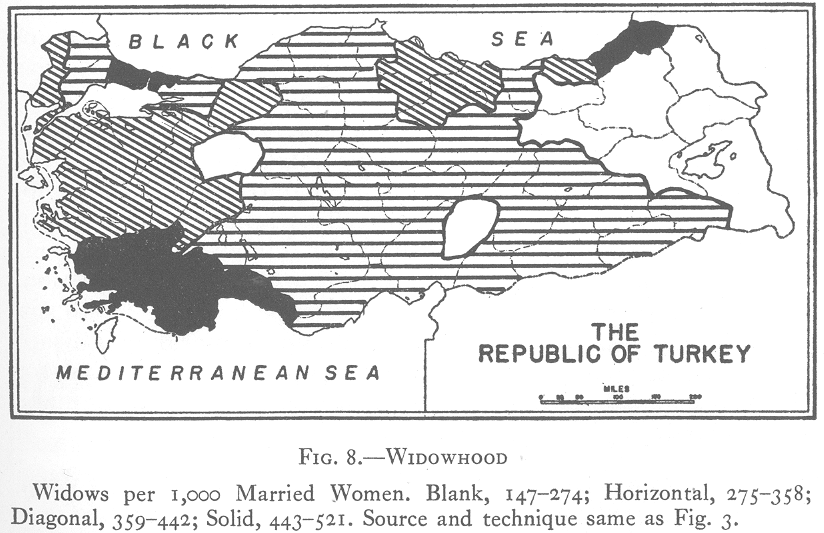
Distribution of widows is used in finding out males perished

=== Armenians ===
Both contemporaries and later historians have estimated that around 1 million Armenians died during the genocide, with figures ranging from 600,000 to 1.5 million deaths.

=== Assyrians ===
The Assyrian Genocide was the massacre of the Assyrian population in the Ottoman Empire, which were in the regions of southeastern Turkey and the Urmia region of Iran, were deported and massacred by Ottoman and Kurdish armies in 1914 and 1920. Sources have put the death tolls at around 300,000.

=== Greeks ===
The Ottoman Empire under the Young Turks, committed genocide against their Greek citizens from 1914 to 1918, killing approximately 750,000 Greeks, 353,000 of whom were Pontic Greeks from the Black Sea area.

=== Muslims ===
The closest estimate of Muslim civilian casualties in this period is around 500,000.

After the partitioning of the Ottoman Empire, for reliability reasons, the data regarding the Muslim casualties had to be collected by region. The records regarding the Muslim civilians were sealed at the time of the Paris Peace Conference, and there is very little literature review on the Muslim millet, compared to Christian millet of the Empire (see: Armenian casualties).

One plausible explanation that needs further study may be attributable to productivity patterns of the Muslim millet, which could have dropped beyond sustainable levels since most of the men were under arms.

The Anatolian refugees included people who had migrated from war zones and immediate vicinity attempting, by doing so, to escape persecution. For World War I, the relatively most reliable sources can be found for Anatolia, especially in relation to the Caucasus Campaign. There is a total number reached and reported by the Ottoman Empire at the end of 1916. On the basis of previous Ottoman census, the Turkish historian Kamer Kasim (Manchester University, PhD), arrives at the conclusion that the movements of refugees from the Caucasus war zone had reached 1.500.000 people who were relocated in the Mediterranean region and Central Anatolia under very difficult conditions. Kamer Kasım's number or any other number on this issue has not been reported in western sources.

The most horrible cases originate from the current region of Syria, a part of Ottoman Empire until the end of the war. The civilian casualties of Syria was covered in a detailed article (the whole of Greater Syria, and thus including Akkar) by Linda Schatkowski Schilcher. Contributing to as many as 500,000 deaths of the civilians living in this region in the 1915–1917 period, the study lists eight basic factors: (a) the Entente powers' total blockage of the Syrian coast; (b) the inadequacy of the Ottoman supply strategy; deficient harvest and inclement weather; (c) diversion of supplies from Syria as a consequence of the Arab revolt; (d) the speculative frenzy of a number of unscrupulous local grain merchants; the callousness of German military official in Syria, and systematic hoarding by the population at large. In a series of graphs and charts discovered in the Ottoman archives that date to 1915, Zachary J. Foster has shown that hundreds of Lebanese were starving to death or dying from starvation-related diseases (between 156 and 784) everyone month of the war from the fall 1915 onwards.

== See also ==
- World War I casualties
- Persecution of Ottoman Muslims
- Ottoman Empire casualties of war
