= World War I casualties =

A graph showing the World War I military and civilian casualties by individual countries

The total number of military and civilian casualties in World War I is estimated to be 15 to 22 million deaths and about 21 million wounded military personnel, making it one of the deadliest military conflicts in human history.

The total number of deaths includes nine to 11 million military personnel. The civilian death toll was about six to 13 million. The Triple Entente (also known as the Allies) lost about six million military personnel while the Central Powers lost about four million. At least two million died from diseases and six million went missing, presumed dead. This article lists the casualties of the belligerent powers based on official published sources.

About two-thirds of military deaths in World War I were in battle, unlike the conflicts that took place in the 19th century when most deaths were from disease. Nevertheless, disease, including the 1918 flu pandemic and deaths while held as prisoners of war, still caused about one third of total military deaths for all belligerents.

== Classification of casualty statistics ==
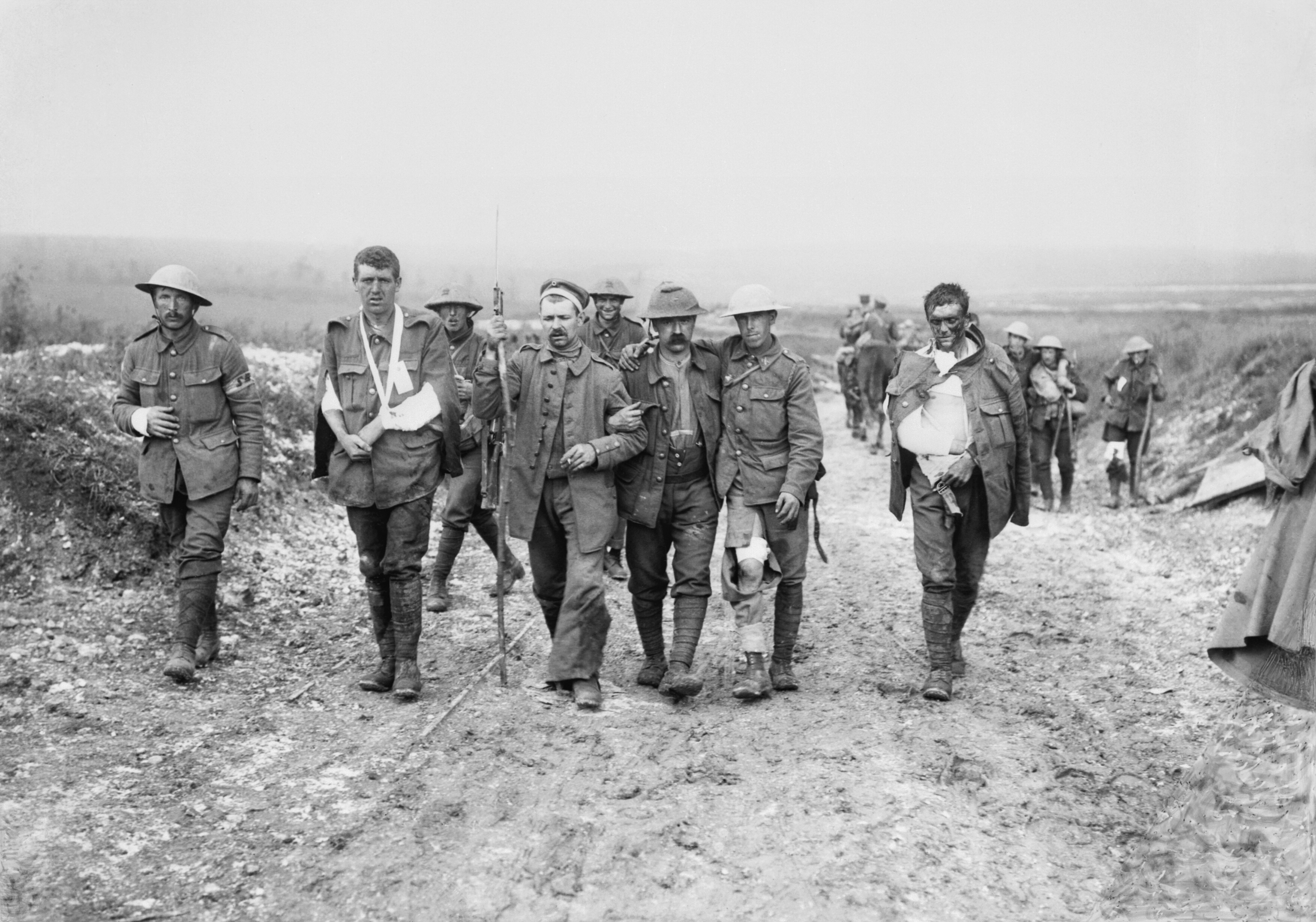
British and German wounded, Bernafay Wood, 19 July 1916. Photo by Ernest Brooks

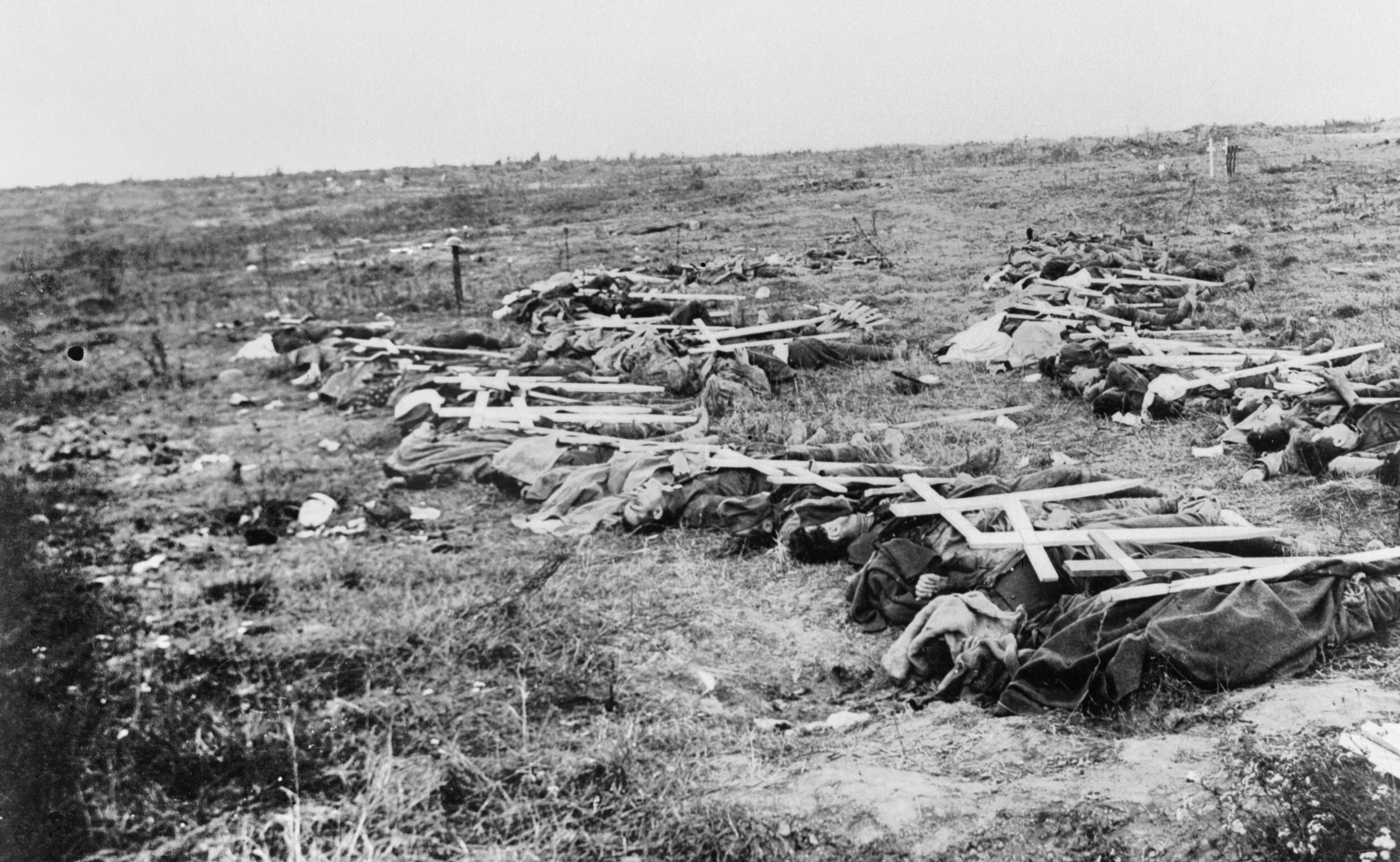
Bodies of men killed near Guillemont Farm collected for burial, September 1918

Casualty statistics for World War I vary to a great extent; estimates of total deaths range from nine million to over 15 million. Military casualties reported in official sources list deaths due to all causes, including an estimated seven to eight million combat related deaths (killed or died of wounds) and another two to three million military deaths caused by accidents, disease and deaths while prisoners of war. Official government reports listing casualty statistics were published by the United States and Great Britain. These secondary sources published during the 1920s, are the source of the statistics in reference works listing casualties in World War I. This article summarizes the casualty statistics published in the official government reports of the United States and Great Britain as well as France, Italy, Belgium, Germany, Austria and Russia. More recently the research of the Commonwealth War Graves Commission (CWGC) has revised the military casualty statistics of the UK and its allies; they include in their listing of military war dead personnel outside of combat theaters and civilians recruited from Africa, the Middle East and China who provided logistical and service support in combat theaters. The casualties of these support personnel recruited outside of Europe were previously not included with British war dead, however the casualties of the Labour Corps recruited from the British Isles were included in the rolls of British war dead published in 1921. The methodology used by each nation to record and classify casualties was not uniform, a general caveat regarding casualty figures is that they cannot be considered comparable in all cases. First World War civilian deaths are "hazardous to estimate" according to Micheal Clodfelter who maintains that "the generally accepted figure of noncombatant deaths is 6.5 million."

== Casualties by borders of 1914 ==
(when the number of deaths in a country is disputed, a range of war losses is given)
(sources and details of figures are provided in the footnotes)

Nation	Population (millions)	Combat deaths and missing in action (included in total military deaths)	Total military deaths (from all causes)	Civilian deaths (military action and crimes against humanity)	Increase in civilian deaths (malnutrition and disease excluding Influenza pandemic)	Total deaths	Deaths as % of population	Military wounded
Allies and co-belligerents of World War I
Australia ^{b}	5.0	61,527	59,330 to 62,149			59,330 to 62,149	1.2% to 1.2%	152,171
Canada ^{d}	7.2	56,638	56,639 to 64,996	1,963		58,639 to 66,996	0.8% to 0.9%	149,732
India ^{g}	315.1	64,449	64,449 to 73,905			64,449 to 73,905	0.021% to 0.023%	69,214
New Zealand ^{l}	1.1	18,166	16,711 to 18,060			16,711 to 18,060	1.5% to 1.6%	41,317
Newfoundland ^{m}	0.2	1,204	1,204 to 1,570(included with UK)			1,204 to 1,570	0.6% to 0.8%	2,314
South Africa ^{r}	6.0	7,121	7,121 to 9,726			7,121 to 9,726	0.1% to 0.2%	12,029
United Kingdom (and colonies) ^{s}	45.4	744,000^{s1}	887,858	16,829	107,000 to 400,000	867,829 to 1,011,687	1.9% to 2.2%	1,675,000^{s1}
Sub-total; British Empire	380.0	953,104	949,454 to 1,118,264	18,829	107,000	1,077,283 to 1,244,093	0.3% to 0.3%	2,101,077
Belgium ^{c}	7.4	38,170	38,170 to 58,637	23,700	62,000	123,870 to 144,337	1.7% to 2%	44,686
France ^{e}	39.6	1,150,000	1,357,000 to 1,397,800	40,000	300,000 to 600,000	1,697,000 to 1,737,800	4.3% to 4.4%	4,266,000
Greece ^{f}	4.8	5,000	5,000 to 26,000		150,000	155,000 to 176,000	3.2% to 3.7%	21,000
Italy ^{h}	35.6	460,000	460,000 to 709,000	3,400	332,000 to 589,000	1,052,400 to 1,301,400	3% to 3.7%	947,000 to 1,050,000
Japan ^{i}	53.6	300	300 to 4,661			300 to 4,661	0% to 0%	907
Montenegro ^{k}	0.5	3,000	3,000 to 13,325			3,000 to 13,325	0.6% to 2.7%	10,000
Portugal ^{n}	6.0	7,222	7,222	13	82,000	89,235	1.5%	13,751
Romania ^{o}	7.5	335,706	250,000 to 335,706	130,000	200,000	580,000 to 665,706	7.7% to 8.9%	120,000
Russia ^{p}	175.1	775,369 to 1,700,000	1,700,000 to 2,254,369	410,000	730,000	2,840,000 to 3,394,369	1.6% to 1.9%	3,749,000 to 4,950,000
Serbia ^{q}	4.5	127,500	300,000 to 450,000		450,000 to 800,000	750,000 to 1,250,000	16.7% to 27.8%	133,148
United States ^{t}	92.0	53,402	116,708	757		117,466	0.1%	204,002
Total; Allied Powers	806.6	4,833,404	5,186,854 to 6,433,692	626,699	3,420,000 to 3,770,000	9,235,553 to 10,080,391	1.1% to 1.2%	11,611,271 to 12,812,271
Central Powers
Austria-Hungary ^{u}	51.4	1,016,200	1,200,000 to 1,494,200	120,000	467,000	1,787,000 to 2,081,200	3.5% to 4%	3,620,000
Bulgaria ^{v}	4.5	87,500	87,500		100,000	187,500	3.4%	152,390
Germany ^{w}	64.9	1,800,000	2,037,000	720	300,000 to 763,000	2,198,420 to 2,800,720	3.4% to 4.3%	4,215,662
Ottoman Empire ^{x}	21.3	305,085	325,000 to 771,844	1,500,000	1,000,000	2,825,000 to 3,271,844	13.3% to 15.4%	400,000 to 763,753
Total; Central Powers	142.1	3,208,785	3,386,200 to 4,390,544	1,620,720	1,991,000 to 2,330,000	6,997,920 to 8,341,264	4.9% to 5.9%	8,388,052 to 8,751,805
Neutral nations
Denmark ^{y}	2.8	See footnote re: Danes in German military			700	700	0%	—
Luxembourg ^{j}	0.3		2,800				See footnote	
Norway ^{z}	2.4				1,180	1,180	0.1%	—
Persia ^{az}	10.5				2,000,000	2,000,000	19%	—
Sweden ^{bz}	5.6				800	800	0%	—
Albania ^{cz}	0.7 to 0.8					70,000	8.75% to 10%	—
Liechtenstein^{dz}	0.0087		4			4	0.05%	—
Grand total	959.7	8,042,189	8,573,058 to 10,824,240	2,250,099	5,411,000 to 8,100,000	15,000,000 to 22,000,000	1.7% to 2.3%	22,101,100 to 23,665,873

The source of population data is: Haythornthwaite, Philip J., The World War One Source Book pp. 382–383

== Casualties by post-war (1924) borders ==
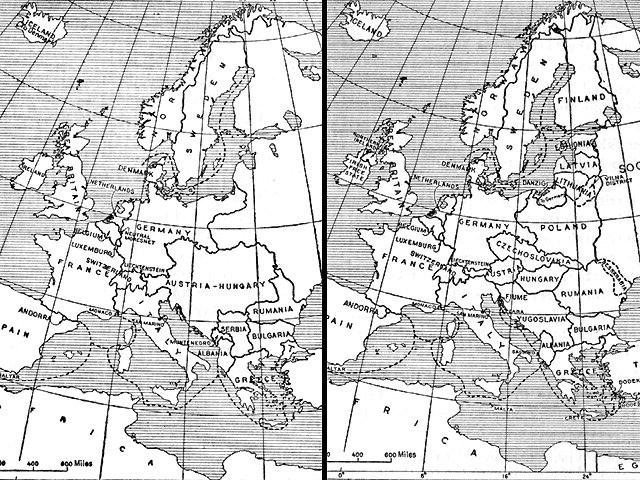
Europe 1914 and 1924

The war involved multi-ethnic empires such as Great Britain, France, Germany, Russia, Austria-Hungary and Turkey. Many ethnic groups in these territories were conscripted for military service. The casualties listed by modern borders are also included in the above table of figures for the countries that existed in 1914. The casualty figures by 1924 post war borders are rough estimates by Russian historian Vadim Erlikman in a 2004 handbook of human losses in the 20th century, the sources of his figures were published in the Soviet era and in post-Soviet Russia.

According to the 1914–1918 Online Encyclopedia "In addition to losses suffered by African military personnel and the laborers supporting their operations, very large, but unknown numbers of African civilians perished during the war." They made an estimate of civilian losses in Africa of 750,000 based on the study by the Vadim Erlikman. They noted that Erlikman's figures are based on the work of the Russian demographer Boris Urlanis, noting that these estimates were "imprecise" and "could be used to provide a frame of reference for further inquiry". The Oxford History of World War One notes that "In east and central Africa the harshness of the war resulted in acute shortages of food with famine in some areas, a weakening of populations, and epidemic diseases which killed hundreds of thousands of people and also cattle."

- Austria

The following estimates of Austrian deaths, within contemporary borders, were made by a Russian historian in a 2004 handbook of human losses in the 20th century. Total dead 175,000: including military losses 120,000 with the Austro-Hungarian forces and POW deaths in captivity of 30,000. Civilian dead due to famine and disease were 25,000.

- Belarus

The following estimates of Belarusian deaths, within contemporary borders, were made by a Russian historian in a 2004 handbook of human losses in the 20th century. Total dead 130,000: including military losses 70,000 with the Russian forces. Civilian dead were 60,000.

- Ukraine

The following estimates of Ukrainian deaths, within contemporary borders, were made by a Russian historian in a 2004 handbook of human losses in the 20th century. Total dead 590,000: including military losses 450,000,(Erlikman did not break out military losses between Austro-Hungarian and Russian armed forces). Civilian dead were 140,000.

- Democratic Republic of the Congo

The Belgian Congo was part of the Kingdom of Belgium during the war. A Russian historian Vadim Erlikman in a 2004 handbook of human losses in the 20th century based on sources published in the Soviet Union and Russia estimated a total of 155,000 deaths in the Belgian Congo during the war.

- Czechoslovakia

Czechoslovakia was part of Austro-Hungary during the war. The estimates of Czechoslovak deaths within 1991 borders were made by a Russian historian in a 2004 handbook of human losses in the 20th century. Total dead 185,000: including military losses 110,000 with the Austro-Hungarian forces and POW deaths in captivity of 45,000. Civilian dead due to famine and disease were 30,000. The Czechoslovak Legions fought with the armies of the Allies during the war.

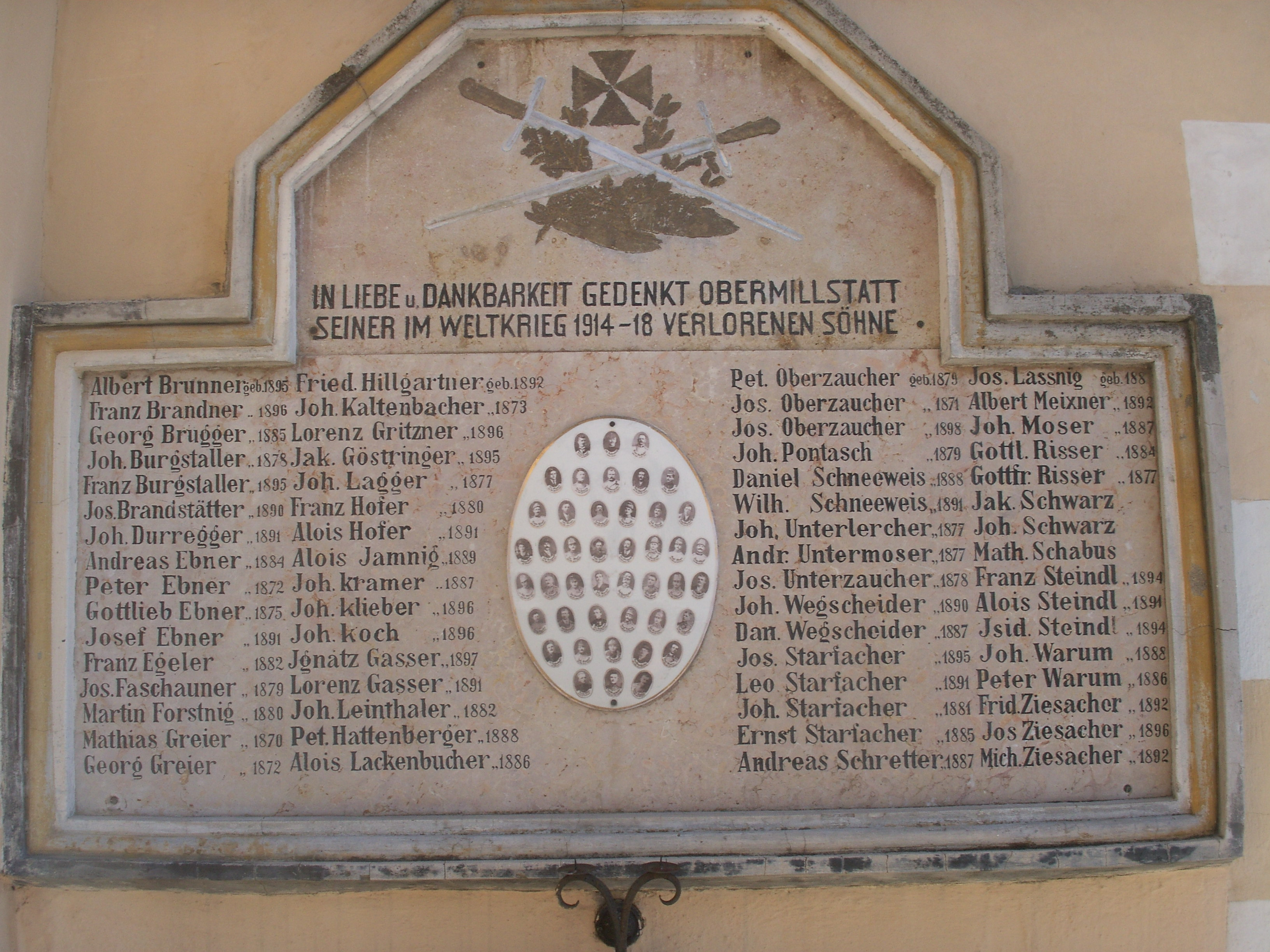
Austrian memorial commemorating soldiers from the village of Obermillstatt who died in World War I

- Estonia

Estonia was part of the Russian Empire during the war and about 100,000 Estonians served in the Russian Army. Of them about 10,000 were killed.

- Finland

From 1809 Finland was an autonomous Grand Duchy in the Russian Empire until the end of 1917. Finland's autonomous status meant that Finns were exempt from conscription into the Russian Army. Approximately 800 Finns voluntarily served during World War I. According to data regarding Finnish war casualties, 317 Finns were killed between 1914 and 1917.

- (French Third Republic) French colonies

The following estimates of deaths, within contemporary borders, during World War I were made by a Russian historian Vadim Erlikman in a 2004 handbook of human losses in the 20th century. Erlikman's estimates are based on sources published in the Soviet Union and Russia. These numbers only include military deaths, total civilian deaths in Africa could amount up to 750,000.

Algeria (1914 known as French Algeria): 26,000
Vietnam (1914 known as French Indochina): 12,000
Mali (1914 part of French West Africa): 10,000
Morocco (1914 known as the French protectorate of Morocco): 8,000
Senegal (1914 part of French West Africa): 6,000
Guinea (1914 part of French West Africa): 2,500
Madagascar: 2,500 military
Benin (1914 part of French West Africa): 2,000
Burkina Faso (1914 part of French West Africa): 2,000
Republic of the Congo (1914 part of French Equatorial Africa): 2,000
Ivory Coast (1914 part of French West Africa): 2,000
Tunisia (1914 known as French Tunisia): 2,000
Chad (1914 part of French Equatorial Africa): 1,500
Central African Republic (1914 known as French Oubangui-Chari): 1,000
Niger (1914 part of French West Africa): 1,000
Gabon (1914 part of French Equatorial Africa): 500
India (French Establishments in India): 195

Total: 82,000

- Georgia

The following estimates of Georgian deaths, within contemporary borders, were made by a Russian historian in a 2004 handbook of human losses in the 20th century. Georgia was part of the Russian Empire during the war and about 150,000 Georgians served in the Russian Army. Of them about 10,000 were killed.

- (German Empire) German colonies

The following estimates of deaths, within contemporary borders, during World War I were made by a Russian historian Vadim Erlikman in a 2004 handbook of human losses in the 20th century. Erlikman's estimates are based on sources published in the Soviet Union and Russia. These numbers only include military deaths, total civilian deaths in Africa could amount up to 750,000.

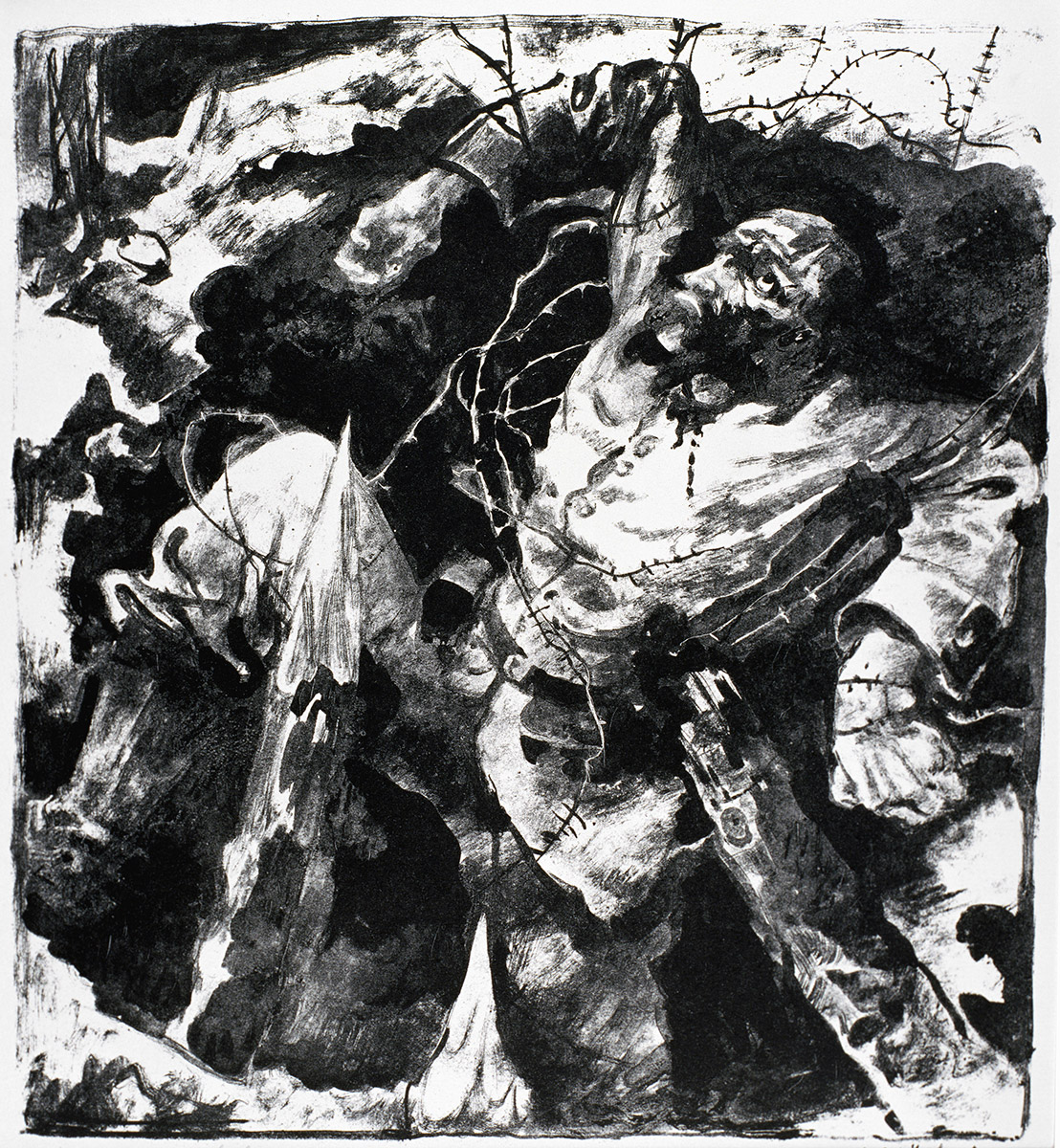
Dying Soldier in a Trench (1915) by Willy Jaeckel

Tanzania (1914 part of German East Africa): 20,000
Namibia (1914 known as German South-West Africa): 1,000
Cameroon (1914 known as Kamerun): 5,000 military and 50,000 civilian
Togo (1914 known as German Togoland): 2,000
Rwanda (1914 part of German East Africa): 15,000

Total: 48,000

- Hungary

The following estimates of Hungarian deaths, within contemporary borders, during World War I were made by a Russian historian in a 2004 handbook of human losses in the 20th century. Total dead 385,000: including military losses 270,000 with the Austro-Hungarian forces and POW deaths in captivity of 70,000. Civilian dead due to famine and disease were 45,000.

- Ireland

Ireland was a part of the United Kingdom during World War I. Five-sixths of the island left to form the Irish Free State, now the Republic of Ireland, in 1922. A total of 206,000 Irishmen served in the British forces during the war. The number of Irish deaths in the British Army recorded by the registrar general was 27,405. A significant number of these casualties were from what, in 1920, became Northern Ireland. While 49,400 soldiers died serving in Irish divisions (the 10th, 16th and 36th), although not all of the men serving in these divisions were natives of Ireland and many Irish who died in non-Irish regiments are not listed. For example, 29% of the casualties in the 16th Division were not natives of Ireland. Neither does it include Irish emigrants in Britain who enlisted there and are not categorised as Irish. Australia lists 4,731 of its first World War soldiers as having been born in Ireland and more than 19,000 Irish-born soldiers served in the Canadian Corps. According to research done by John Horne of Trinity College Dublin, there are at least 30,986 soldiers who were born in Ireland that died; however, that's considered a "conservative" estimate and is very likely to rise.

- Mozambique

The losses of Portuguese Mozambique were estimated by a Russian historian Vadim Erlikman in a 2004 handbook of human losses in the 20th century. Erlikman's estimates are based on sources published in the Soviet Union and Russia. 52,000

- Poland

Poland was territory of Germany, Austria-Hungary and partially annexed by Russia, from 1772 to 1918. By late 1915, Germany had complete control over modern-day Poland. A 2005 Polish study estimated 3,376,800 Poles were conscripted into the armed forces of these countries during World War I, an additional 300,000 were conscripted for forced labor by the Germans. The Russians and Austrians forcibly resettled 1.6 to 1.8 million persons from the war zone in Poland. According to Micheal Clodfelter, Polish war dead were 1,080,000, whilst 200,000 Polish civilians were killed in the fighting on the Eastern Front; 870,000 men served in the German, Austrian and Russian armies. Another estimate made by a Russian historian in a 2004 handbook of human losses in the 20th century, put total Polish war dead at 640,000, including military losses of 270,000 Poles conscripted, civilian losses of 120,000 due to military operations and 250,000 caused by famine and disease. The ethnic Polish Blue Army served with the French Army. The ethnic Polish Legions fought as part of the Austro-Hungarian Army on the Eastern Front.

- Romania

The territory of Transylvania was part of Austria-Hungary during World War I. The following estimates of Romanian deaths, within contemporary borders, during World War I were made by a Russian historian in a 2004 handbook of human losses in the 20th century. Total dead: 748,000, including military losses of 220,000 with the Romanian forces, 150,000 with the Austro-Hungarian forces and POW deaths in captivity of 48,000. Civilian dead were as follows due to famine and disease: 200,000, killed in military operations 120,000 and 10,000 dead in Austrian prisons.

- (United Kingdom) British colonies

Britain recruited Indian, Chinese, native South African, Egyptian and other overseas labour to provide logistical support in the combat theatres. Included with British casualties in East Africa are the deaths of 44,911 recruited labourers. The CWGC reports that nearly 2,000 workers from the Chinese Labour Corps are buried with British war dead in France.

The following estimates of British Empire colonial military deaths, within contemporary borders, during World War I were made by a Russian historian Vadim Erlikman in a 2004 handbook of human losses in the 20th century. Erlikman's estimates are based on sources published in the Soviet Union and Russia.

Ghana (1914 known as the Gold Coast): 1,200
Kenya (1914 known as British East Africa): 2,000
Malawi (1914 known as Nyasaland): 3,000
Nigeria (1914 part of British West Africa): 5,000
Sierra Leone (1914 part of British West Africa): 1,000
Uganda (1914 known as the Uganda Protectorate): 1,500
Zambia (1914 known as Northern Rhodesia): 3,000
Zimbabwe (1914 known as Southern Rhodesia): 5,716 persons of European origin served in the war, of whom about 700 were killed, or died of wounds or other causes. In explicitly Rhodesian units, 127 were killed, 24 died of wounds, 101 died of disease or other causes and 294 were wounded. Of the territory's black African servicemen, 31 were killed in action, 142 died of other causes and 116 were wounded.

Total: 18,000

- Kingdom of Yugoslavia

The following estimates are for Yugoslavia within the 1991 borders.

Slovenia, Croatia, Bosnia and Vojvodina (Now part of Serbia) were part of Austria-Hungary during World War I. Serbia, which included Macedonia, and Montenegro was an independent nation. The Yugoslav historian Vladimir Dedijer put the total losses of the Yugoslav lands at 1.9 million, of which 43% were from Serbia. The following estimates of Yugoslav deaths, within 1991 borders, during World War I were made by a Russian historian in a 2004 handbook of human losses in the 20th century. Total dead: 996,000 including military losses, 260,000 with the Serbian forces, 80,000 with the Austro-Hungarian forces, 13,000 with Montenegrin forces and POW deaths in captivity of 93,000. Civilian dead were as follows due to famine and disease: 400,000, killed in military operations: 120,000 and 30,000 dead in Austrian prisons or executed.

- Nepal

During World War I, the Nepalese army was expanded and six new regiments, totaling more than 20,000 troops—all volunteers—were sent to India, most of them to the North-West Frontier Province, to release British and Indian troops for service overseas. Simultaneously, the Nepalese government agreed to maintain recruitment at a level that would sustain the existing British Gurkha units and allow the establishment of additional ones. The battalions were increased to thirty-three with the addition of 55,000 new recruits and Gurkha units were placed at the disposal of the British high command for service on all fronts. Many volunteers were assigned to non-combat units, such as the Army Bearer Corps and the labour battalions but they also were in combat in France, Turkey, Palestine and Mesopotamia. The Rana prime ministers urged Nepalese males to fight in the war. Of the more than 200,000 Nepalese who served in the British army, there were some 20,000 Gurkha casualties included above with the British Indian Army.

== Footnotes ==
Deaths by alliance and military/civilian. Most of the civilian deaths were due to war-related famine.

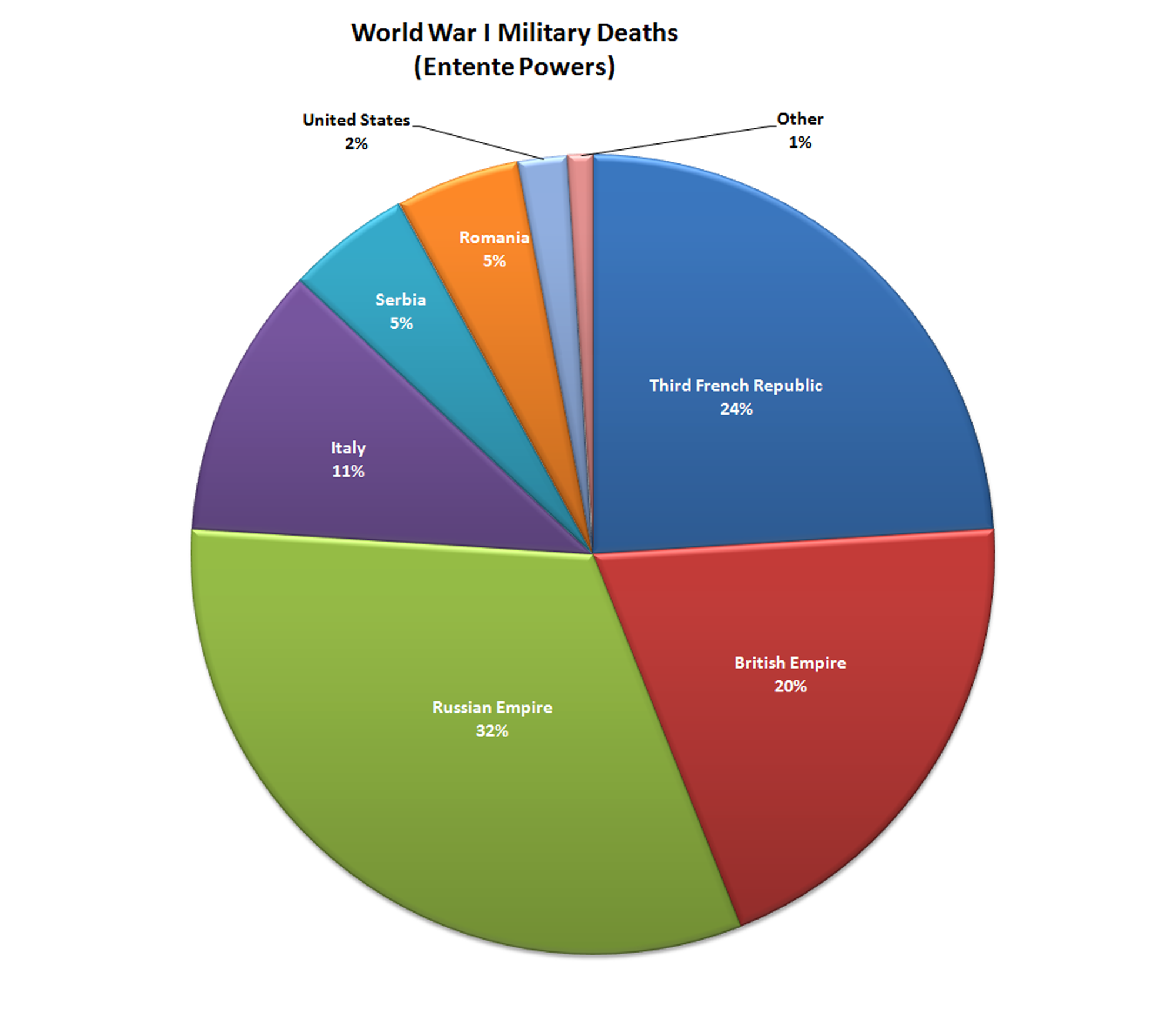
Deaths of the Allied powers

Deaths of the Central powers

^^{a} East and Central Africa

- The conflict in East Africa caused enormous civilian casualties. The Oxford History of World War One notes that "In east and central Africa the harshness of the war resulted in acute shortages of food with famine in some areas, a weakening of populations, and epidemic diseases which killed hundreds of thousands of people and also cattle." According to the 1914–1918 Online Encyclopedia "In addition to losses suffered by African military personnel and the laborers supporting their operations, very large, but unknown numbers of African civilians perished during the war." They made an estimate of civilian losses in Africa of 750,000 The following estimates of civilian deaths in East Africa during World War I were made by a Russian historian in a 2004 handbook of human losses in the 20th century: Kenya 30,000; Tanzania 100,000; Mozambique 50,000; Rwanda 15,000; Burundi 20,000 and the Belgian Congo 150,000.
- The military casualties of the UK, France, Germany, Belgium and Portugal include Africans who served with their armed forces, the details are noted above in the list of the various colonies.

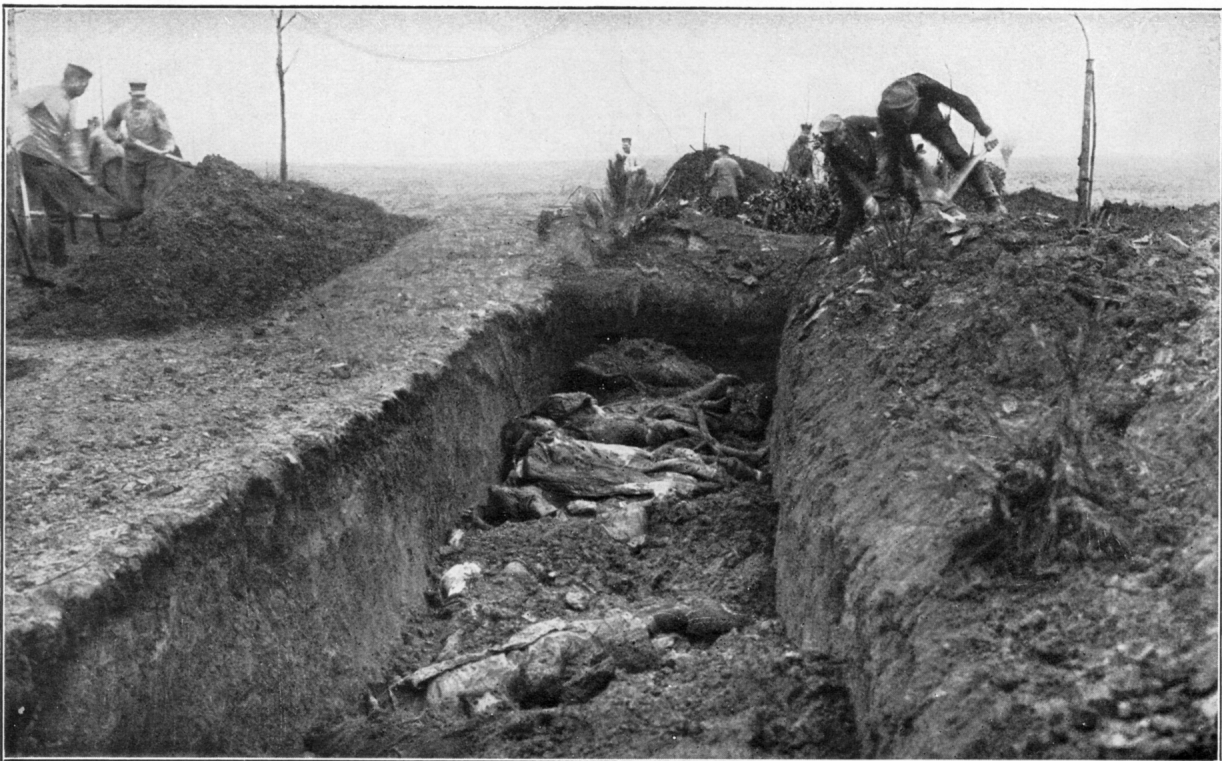
Fallen British and Australian soldiers in a mass grave, dug by German soldiers, 1916 or 1917

^^{b}Australia

- The Australian War Memorial puts their war dead at 61,513.
- The Australian War Memorial maintains a database listing the names of war dead.
- The Commonwealth War Graves Commission figure for Australian war dead is 62,149.
- The report of the UK War Office listed 59,330 Army war dead, 152,171 wounded and 4,084 taken prisoner.
- In 1924, the Australian government in a reply to a questionnaire from the International Labour Office, an agency of the League of Nations, reported 412,953 men mobilized and 59,337 dead and missing in World War I.
- The Soviet demographer Boris Urlanis estimated that included in total military deaths are 54,000 killed and died of wounds.

^^{c} Belgium

- Belgian government figures for military losses in Europe were 40,367 (26,338 killed, died of wounds or accidents and 14,029 died of disease or missing). In Africa: 2,620 soldiers were killed and 15,650 porters died. The combined total for Europe and Africa is 58,637.
- United States War Dept. figures for Belgium are: Total mobilized force 267,000; total casualties 93,061 including killed and died 13,716; wounded 44,686; Prisoners and missing 34,659.
- The report of the UK War Office listed 93,061 casualties up until 11 November 1918 including 13,716 killed and died; 24,456 missing; 44,686 wounded and 10,208 POW. "These figures are approximate only, the records being incomplete."
- In 1924, the Belgian government in a reply to a questionnaire from the International Labour Office, an agency of the League of Nations, reported 365,000 men mobilized and 40,936 dead and missing in World War I.
- The Soviet demographer Boris Urlanis estimated that included in total Belgian military deaths are 35,000 killed and died of wounds
- Civilian deaths according to Belgian government statistics were 23,700 (6,000 killed in the 1914 German massacres and 17,700 victims in prisons, deportations and by military tribunals). According to a demographic study, there were 92,000 indirect deaths in Belgium (62,000 deaths due to wartime privations and 30,000 in the Spanish flu pandemic). John Horne estimated that 6,500 Belgian and French civilians were killed in German reprisals.

^^{d}Canada

- According to the Canadian War Museum Close to 61,000 Canadians were killed during the war, and another 172,000 were wounded. The small Dominion of Newfoundland suffered 1,305 killed and several thousand wounded. The Canadian Expeditionary Force lost 59,544 in the war, including 51,748 due to enemy action; the Royal Canadian Navy reported 150 deaths from all causes and 1,388 Canadians died while serving with the British Flying Services.
- The Commonwealth War Graves Commission figure for Canadian war dead is 64,996.
- The report of the UK War Office listed 56,639 Canadian war dead, 149,732 wounded and 3,729 taken prisoner.
- In 1924, the Canadian government in a reply to a questionnaire from the International Labour Office, an agency of the League of Nations, reported 628,964 men mobilized and 51,674 dead and missing in World War I.
- The Soviet demographer Boris Urlanis estimated that included in total Canadian military deaths are 53,000 killed and died of wounds.
- The Canadian Virtual War Memorial contains a registry of information about the graves and memorials of Canadians and Newfoundlanders who served valiantly and gave their lives for their country.
- The 2,000 civilian deaths were due to the Halifax Explosion.

^^{e}France

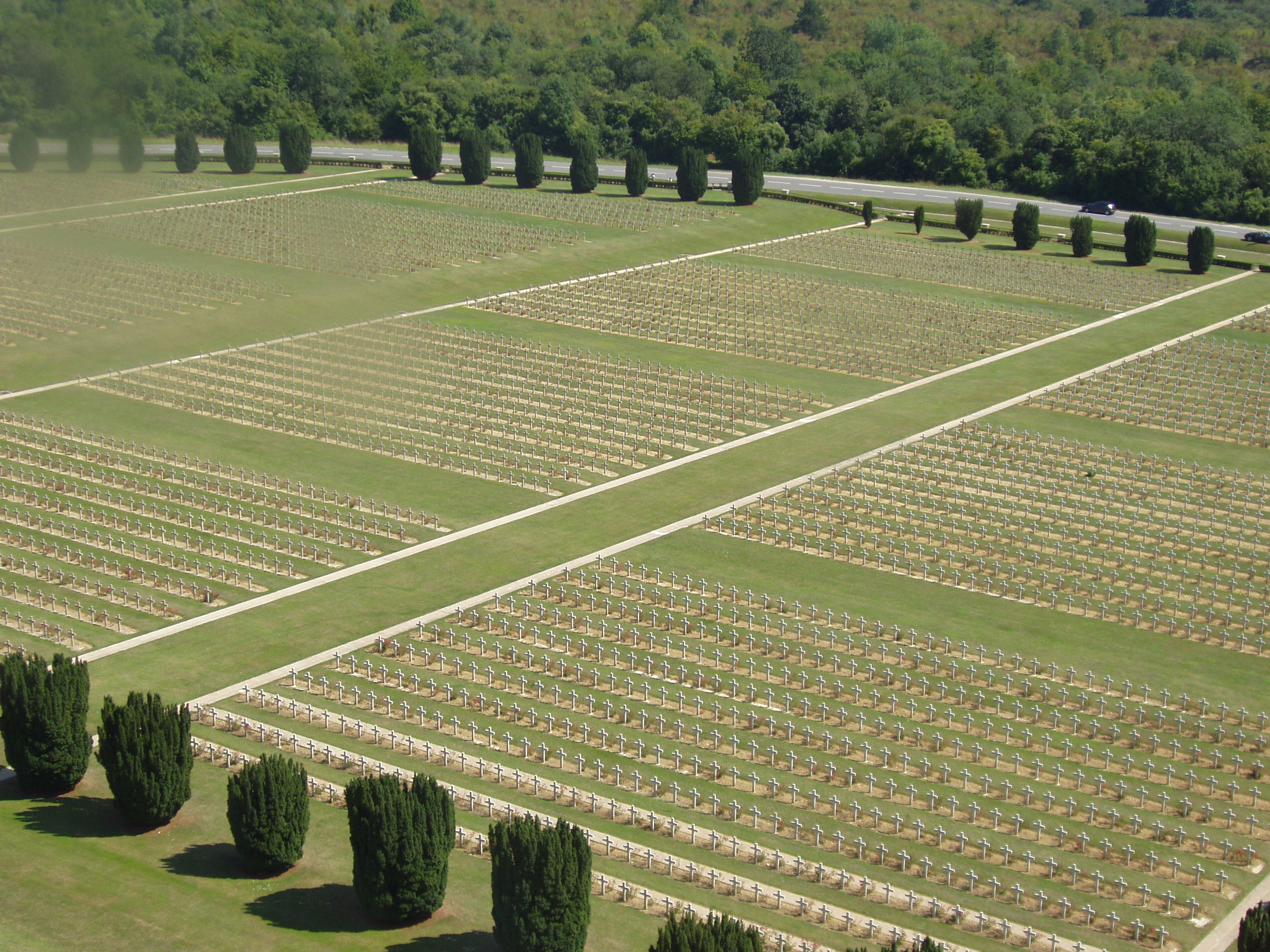
Douaumont French Army cemetery seen from Douaumont ossuary, which contains remains of French and German soldiers who died during the Battle of Verdun in 1916

- French casualty figures up until 1 June 1919 were listed in a French government report of 1 August 1919 presented to the French Chamber of Deputies. Total Army dead and missing up until 11 November 1918 were 1,357,800; in addition there were 28,600 deaths after 11 November 1918 of those wounded and 11,400 Navy dead which brings total dead and missing to 1,397,800. These figures include 35,200 French Colonial Forces, 35,900 "north Africans" and 4,600 French Foreign Legion personnel.
- According to the French Army official report "La Statistique médicale de l'armée" Total dead were 1,325,000 (675,000 killed in action, 225,000 missing and prisoners killed, 250,000 died of wounds and 175,000 died of disease.)
- A breakdown of French casualties published in the Official History of the Australian Army Medical Services, 1914–1918 lists 674,700 killed in action, 250,000 died of wounds, 225,300 missing and presumed dead and 175,000 dead from disease and injury. Wounded amounted to 2,300,000.
- United States War Dept. figures for French casualties are: Total mobilized force 8,410,000; total casualties 6,160,800 including killed and died: 1,357,800, wounded: 4,266,000, prisoners and missing: 537,000.
- The UK War Office put French dead, killed and missing at 1,385,300 dead and missing, including 58,000 colonial soldiers up until 1 November 1918. They noted that a government report of 1 August 1919, listed the number of killed and died at 1,357,000. There were no figures available of the wounded.
- In 1924, the French government in a reply to a questionnaire from the International Labour Office, an agency of the League of Nations, reported 7,935,000 men mobilized and 1,400,000 dead and missing in World War I.
- The names of the soldiers who died for France during World War I are listed on-line by the French government.
- The Soviet demographer Boris Urlanis estimated that included in total French military deaths are 1,126,000 killed and died of wounds.
- According to the French encyclopedia Quid 30–40,000 foreign volunteers from about 40 nationalities served in the French army, including 12,000 with the Czechoslovak Legion and the ethnic Polish Blue Army; 5,000 Italians served in a "Legion" commanded by Colonel Garibaldi. There were also 1,000 Spaniards and 1,500 Swiss in French service, 200 American volunteers served with the French from 1914 to 1916, including the Lafayette Escadrille. Luxembourg was occupied by Germany during the war. According to the Mobile Reference travel Guide 3,700 Luxembourg citizens served in the French armed forces, 2,800 gave their lives in the war. They are commemorated at the Gëlle Fra in Luxembourg. The French Armenian Legion served as part of the French armed forces during the war. French colonies, such as Algeria and Vietnam, also sent troops to fight and serve on the battlefront. American military historian Douglas Porch reported of the French Foreign Legion, in which most non-French nationals served, that some estimates put Legion casualties during the war as high as 31,000 of the 44,150 men who served in the Legion, a 70 per cent casualty rate.
- According to a demographic study, there were 500,000 indirect deaths in France (300,000 deaths due to wartime privations and 200,000 in the Spanish flu pandemic). Another estimate of the demographic loss of the civilian population in the France during the war, put total excess deaths at 264,000 to 284,000, not including an additional 100,000 to 120,000 Spanish flu deaths. Civilian dead include 1,509 merchant sailors and 3,357 killed in air attacks and long range artillery bombardments Kramer quotes Huber as estimating 600,000 excess deaths, though it's unclear what proportion are due to influenza.
- Tertiary sources put French civilian war dead at 40,000.

^^{f}Greece

- The Soviet demographer Boris Urlanis estimated total military dead of 26,000, including 15,000 deaths due to disease and 11,000 killed and died of wounds
- United States War Dept. figures for Greek casualties are: Total mobilized force 230,000; total casualties 27,000 (killed and died 5,000; wounded 21,000; prisoners and missing 1,000).
- The report of the UK War Office listed 27,000 casualties (5,000 killed or died of wounds; 21,000 wounded and 1,000 prisoners and missing).
- In 1924, the Greek government in a reply to a questionnaire from the International Labour Office, an agency of the League of Nations, reported 355,000 men mobilized and no dead and missing in World War I.
- Jean Bujac in a campaign history of the Greek Army in World War I, listed 8,365 combat related deaths and 3,255 missing.
- According to a demographic study there were 150,000 indirect deaths in Greece due to wartime privations.

^^{g}India (British)

- The Commonwealth War Graves Commission figure for Indian war dead is 73,905.
- The report of the UK War Office listed 64,449 Army war dead, 69,214 wounded and 11,264 taken prisoner, these figures include British serving in the Indian Army (2,393 dead, 2,325 wounded and 194 taken prisoner).
- The Soviet demographer Boris Urlanis estimated that included in total Indian military deaths are 27,000 killed and died of wounds.

^^{h}Italy

- The Italian government put military war deaths at 651,000 (killed in action or died of wounds 378,000; died of disease 186,000 plus an additional 87,000 deaths of invalids from 12 November 1918 until 30 April 1920, due to war related injuries.) These official figures were published in an Italian study of war losses by G. Mortara, however he estimated actual losses until the war's end in Nov. 1918, at 600,000 (400,000 killed or died of wounds and 200,000 deaths due to disease). A brief summary of data from this study can be found online.
- United States War Dept. figures for Italian casualties are: Total mobilized force 5,615,000; total casualties 2,197,000 (killed and died 650,000; wounded 947,000; prisoners and missing 600,000).
- The report of the UK War Office listed 1,937,000 casualties up until 11 November 1918 (460,000 dead; 947,000 wounded and 530,000 prisoners).
- In 1924, the Italian government in a reply to a questionnaire from the International Labour Office, an agency of the League of Nations, reported 5,615,000 men mobilized and 750,000 dead and missing in World War I.
- The Soviet demographer Boris Urlanis estimated that included in total Italian military deaths are 433,000 killed and died of wounds.
- According to a demographic study there were 1,021,000 indirect deaths in Italy (589,000 deaths due to wartime privations and 432,000 in the Spanish flu pandemic). Another estimate of the demographic loss of the civilian population in the Italy during the war, put total excess deaths at 324,000 not including an additional 300,000 Spanish flu deaths. Civilian deaths due to military action were 3,400 (including 2,293 by attacks on shipping, 965 during air raids and 142 by sea bombardment). Kramer cites Mario Isnenghi and Giorgio Rochat, La Grande Guerra, 1914–1918 (Florence: Scandicci, 2000), pp. 301–2. They give excess war-related civilian mortality for the period 1915–18 of 606,407, of which influenza accounts for 274,041.
- A relatively recent initiative to render easily accessible data concerning all Italian war dead, is the “ISTORECO PROJECT” (see: ISTORECO Reggio Emilia (Italy). The project, launched in 2008 and continuously expanded and updated (2025), involved the creation and development of a comprehensive Database containing all the data from the " Roll of Honour of the Military Fallen in the National War 1915–1918” (an editorial initiative of the Italian fascist Government, by the Royal Decree of November 22, 1925, No. 2130, and published in Rome in 28 volumes). The database has been made available online by ISTORECO through a publicly accessible website: “Roll of the Italian Fallen in the Great War” (Albo caduti militari della Guerra 1915-18), under the patronage of the Italian Ministry of Defence and other institutions. The digital Roll provides a permanent tool for free and easy access to the data of more than 531,000 fallen soldiers. The information collected is continuously corrected, updated, and supplemented thanks to ongoing researches or access to new sources by the editorial team of the website. Among the project’s most commendable goals is the effort to identify the exact burial place of every fallen soldier recorded.

^^{i} Japan

- In 1924, the Japanese government in a reply to a questionnaire from the International Labour Office, an agency of the League of Nations, reported 800,000 men mobilized and 4,661 dead and missing in World War I.
- The Yasukuni Shrine lists 4,850 dead in World War I.
- United States War Dept. figures for Japanese casualties are: total mobilized force 800,000; total casualties 1,210 (including Killed and died 300; wounded 907; Prisoners and missing 3).

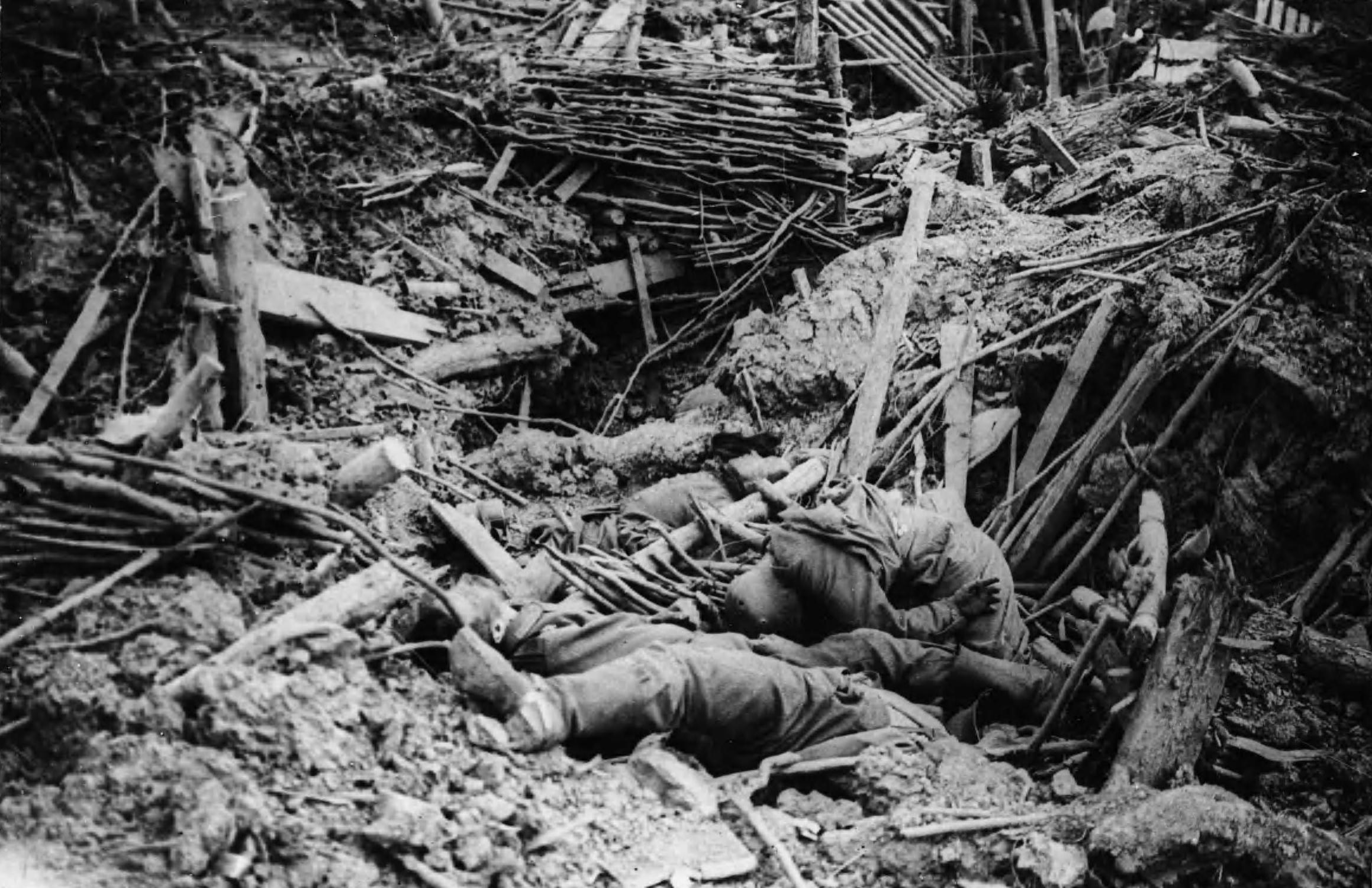
German trench destroyed by a mine explosion, 1917

^^{k} Montenegro

- In 1924, the Yugoslav government in a reply to a questionnaire from the International Labour Office, an agency of the League of Nations, reported Montenegro mobilized 50,000 men and 13,325 were dead and missing in World War I.
- United States War Dept. figures for Montenegrin casualties are: total mobilized force 50,000; total casualties 20,000 including killed and died 3,000; wounded 10,000; prisoners and missing 7,000.

^^{l} New Zealand

- The Auckland War Memorial Museum commemorates the 18,060 New Zealand World War I dead.
- The Auckland War Memorial Museum maintains a database listing the names of the New Zealand war dead.
- The Commonwealth War Graves Commission figure for New Zealand war dead is 18,060.
- The report of the UK War Office listed 16,711 army war dead, 41,317 wounded and 498 taken prisoner.
- The Soviet demographer Boris Urlanis estimated that included in total New Zealand military deaths are 14,000 killed and died of wounds.

^^{m} Newfoundland

- The Dominion of Newfoundland was not part of Canada during World War I. The report of the UK War Office listed 1,204 Army war dead, 2,314 wounded and 150 taken prisoner.
- An academic journal published in Newfoundland has given the details of Newfoundland's military casualties. Fatalities totaled 1,570 The Royal Newfoundland Regiment suffered 1,297 dead; there were an additional 171 dead in the Royal Navy and 101 in the Merchant Navy.

^^{n} Portugal

- United States War Dept. figures for Portuguese casualties are: total mobilized force 100,000; total casualties 33,291 (including killed and died 7,222; wounded 13,751; prisoners and missing 12,318).
- The report of the UK War Office listed 33,291 casualties: 7,222 dead (1,689 in Europe and 5,533 in Africa); 13,751 wounded (figure for Europe only) and 12,318 prisoners and missing (6,678 in Europe and "a large number of missing in Mozambique).
- In 1924, the Portuguese government in a reply to a questionnaire from the International Labour Office, an agency of the League of Nations, reported 100,000 men mobilized and 4,000 dead and missing in World War I.
- The Soviet demographer Boris Urlanis estimated that included in total Portuguese military deaths are 6,000 killed or missing in action and died of wounds.
- According to a demographic study there were 220,000 indirect deaths in Portugal (82,000 deaths due to wartime privations and 138,000 in the Spanish flu pandemic).
- 13 Portuguese civilians that were killed during bombardment of Funchal, Madeira Island on 3 December 1916, and 12 December 1917, by German submarines.

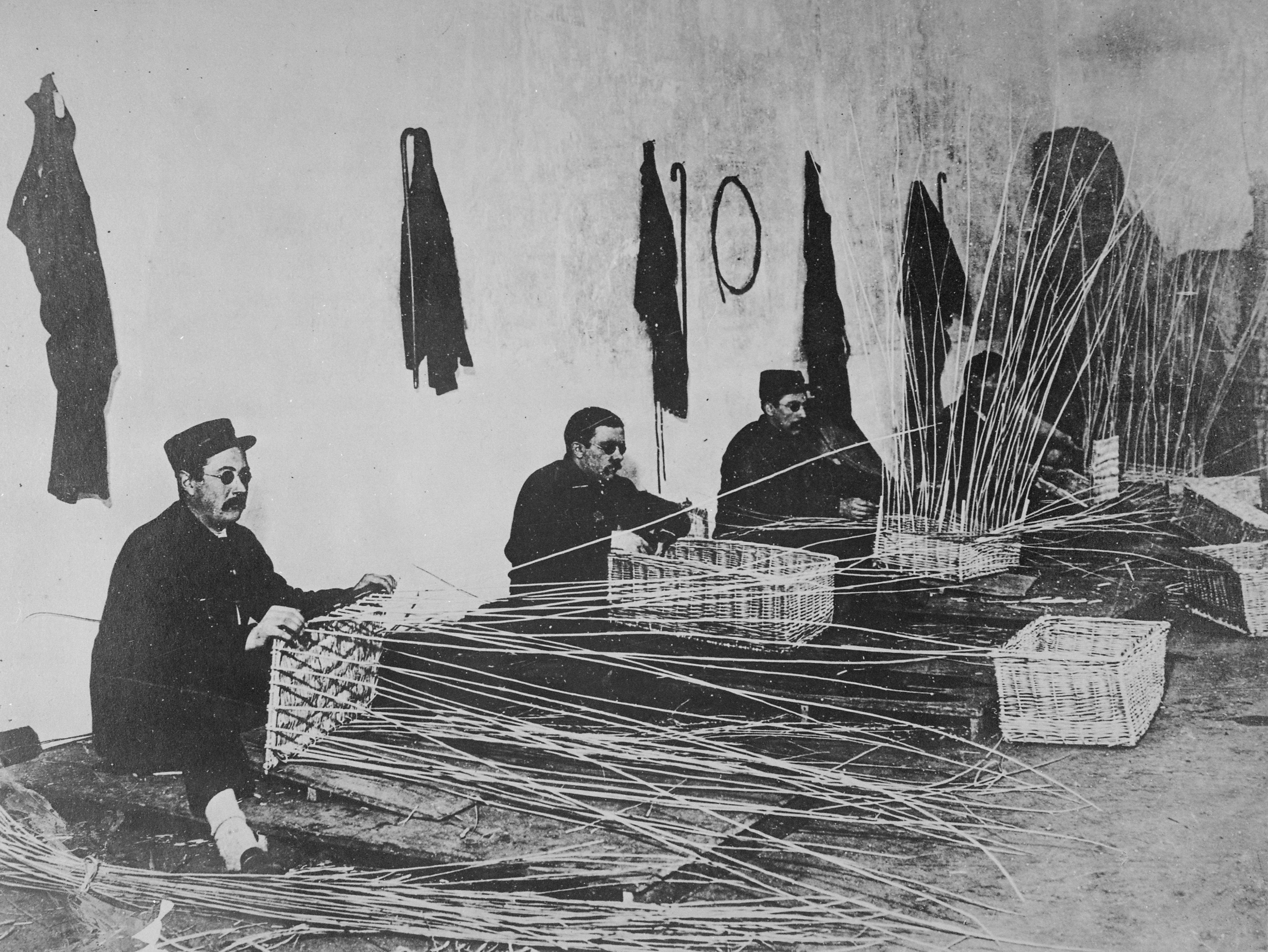
Re-educating wounded. Blind French soldiers learning to make baskets, World War I.

^^{o} Romania

- In 1924, the Romanian government in a reply to a questionnaire from the International Labour Office, an agency of the League of Nations, reported 1,000,000 men mobilized and 250,000 dead and missing in World War I.
- United States War Dept. figures for Romanian casualties are: total mobilized force 750,000; total casualties 535,706 (including killed and died 335,706; wounded 120,000; prisoners and missing 80,000).
- The report of the UK War Office listed military casualties of 335,706 killed or missing. In addition 265,000 civilians were killed or missing.
- The Soviet demographer Boris Urlanis estimated that included in total Romanian military deaths are 177,000 killed and died of wounds.
- According to a demographic study there were 430,000 indirect deaths in Romania due to wartime privations.
- A Russian historian in a 2004 handbook of human losses in the 20th century estimated 330,000 civilian dead (120,000 due to military activity, 10,000 as prisoners and 200,000 caused by famine and disease).

^^{p} Russian Empire

- According to the Soviet demographer Boris Urlanis the sources for Russian casualties are difficult to ascertain. Casualty figures, compiled from the field reports during the war, were published in 1925 by the Soviet Central Statistical office They put Russia's total losses at 775,400 dead and missing, 348,500 disabled and 3,343,900 POW. Those evacuated to the rear area were 1,425,000 sick and 2,844,500 wounded. Included in these figures are battle casualties of 7,036,087. (626,440 killed in action, 17,174 died of wounds, 228,838 missing, 3,409,433 held as prisoners of war and 2,754,202 wounded in action). Urlanis believes that the figures for those killed were considerably underestimated, because a large part of the reports were lost in retreats. Urlanis estimated the actual total military war dead at 1,811,000 (killed 1,200,000, died of wounds 240,000, gassed 11,000, died from disease 155,000, POW deaths 190,000, deaths due to accidents and other causes 15,000).
- A study by the Russian military historian G.F. Krivosheev estimated the total war dead at 2,254,369 (killed in action 1,200,000; missing and presumed dead 439,369; died of wounds 240,000, gassed 11,000, died from disease 155,000, POW deaths 190,000, deaths due to accidents and other causes 19,000). Wounded 3,749,000. POW 3,343,900. Total mobilized force 15,378,000.
- United States War Dept. figures for Russian casualties are: Total mobilized force 12,000,000. Total casualties 9,150,000 (including Killed and died 1,700,000, wounded 4,950,000, prisoners and missing 2,500,000).
- The UK War Office Based on a telegram from Petrograd to Copenhagen in December 1918 listed military casualties of 9,150,000 (including 1,700,000 killed, 1,450,000 disabled, 3,500,000 wounded and 2,500,000 POW).
- In 1924, the Soviet government in a reply to a questionnaire from the International Labour Office, an agency of the League of Nations, reported for Russia 15,070,000 men mobilized and 1,700,000 dead and missing in World War I.
- According to the Soviet demographer Boris Urlanis there were 1,500,000 civilian deaths due to wartime privations up until the end of 1917.
- A Russian historian in a 2004 handbook of human losses in the 20th century estimated 1,140,000 war related Russian civilian deaths, from 1914 to 1917 in 1914 borders (410,000 due to military operations and 730,000 caused by famine and disease).

^^{q} Serbia

- Sources for total Serbian casualties range from 750,000 to 1,250,000.
- A demographic study in 1927, put total the war dead for Serbia and Montenegro at 750,000 (300,000 military and 450,000 civilians). The overall population loss from 1912 to 1920, based on the pre-war level was 1,236,000 persons (including 750,000 in World War I; 150,000 killed in the Balkan Wars and a decline in the number of births of 336,000), in addition there were 47,000 war related deaths during 1914–1920, that are included with deaths by natural causes.
- According to Frédéric Le Moal, Serbian historian Dušan T. Bataković puts their losses at 1,250,000 (450,000 military and 800,000 civilians). These losses are from 1912 to 1918 and include the Balkan Wars. In July 2014, Serbian poet and academic Matija Bećković said "that 402,435 Serbian soldiers have been killed and 845,000 civilians hanged or exterminated in concentration camps during WWI. At a September 2014 conference sponsored by the Serbian Ministry of Defense, Dr. Alexander Nedok put Serbian war dead at 1,247,435 persons.
- According to the Soviet demographer Boris Urlanis regarding Serbia "it is particularly difficult to ascertain the number of killed". Based on a demographic analysis of the population, Urlanis estimated total Serbian and Montenegrin casualties of 728,000 including military dead: 278,000 (140,000 killed in action; 25,000 died of wounds; 50,000 disease; 60,000 POW and 3,000 from other causes) and total civilian dead of 450,000.
- In 1924, the Yugoslav government in a reply to a questionnaire from the International Labour Office, an agency of the League of Nations, reported 1,008,240 men mobilized and 365,164 dead and missing in World War I.
- United States War Dept. figures for Serbian casualties are: total mobilized force 707,343; total casualties 331,106 (including killed and died 45,000; wounded 133,148; prisoners and missing 152,958).
- The report of the UK War Office listed military casualties of 331,106 including 45,000 killed, 133,148 wounded and 70,243 prisoners and 82,535 missing.
- A Russian historian in a 2004 handbook of human losses in the 20th century, estimated 120,000 Serbian civilian deaths due to military activity and 30,000 executed (казнено и убито) by the Austro-Hungarians. His estimate for total Yugoslav civilian casualties including Austro-Hungarian territory was 550,000.

^^{r} South Africa

- The Commonwealth War Graves Commission figure for South Africa war dead is 9,726
- The report of the UK War Office listed 7,121 Army war dead, 12,029 wounded and 1,538 taken prisoner.
- In 1924, the South African government in a reply to a questionnaire from the International Labour Office, an agency of the League of Nations, reported 136,070 men mobilized and 7,134 dead and missing in World War I.
- The Soviet demographer Boris Urlanis estimated that included in total South African military deaths are 5,000 killed and died of wounds.

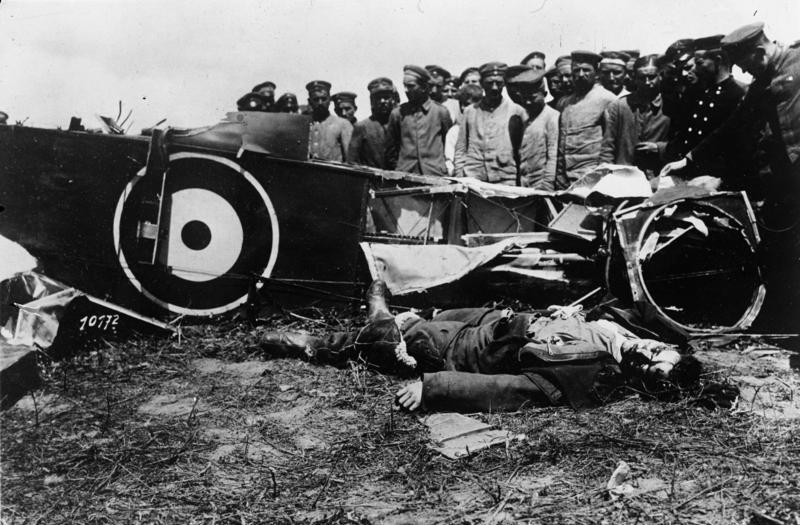
British pilot killed in action, 1917

^^{s} United Kingdom

- ^s1UK military casualties were reported separately by branch of service: Total of 744,000 dead and missing from the British Isles: Army 702,410 "soldiers"; Royal Navy 32,287 Losses at sea were 908 UK civilians and 63 fisherman killed in U-boat attacks.
- Overseas labor units serving with the British and French forces. The UK employed about 300,000 Indian, Chinese, native South African, Egyptian and other nations as laborers during the war. By the end of 1917, there were 50,000 Chinese workers in France, rising to 96,000 by August 1918 (with another 30,000 working for the French). 100,000 Egyptians were working in France and the Middle East, alongside 21,000 Indians and 20,000 South Africans, who were also in East Africa. A total of about 140,000 Chinese workers recruited in the Beiyang government, served on the Western Front during and after the war with the British and French Armed Forces. According to the Commonwealth war Graves Commission "In all, nearly 2,000 men from the Chinese Labour Corps died during the First World War, some as a direct result of enemy action, or of wounds received in the course of their duties, but many more in the influenza epidemic that swept Europe in 1918–19" One historical controversy is the number who died in the war. Some Chinese scholars say the number was as high as 20,000 but records kept by the British and French recruiters, show just under 2,000 lost their lives, many from the flu pandemic that swept the world starting in 1919. According to the Commonwealth War Graves Commission, "The African combatant troops raised for the East African campaign numbered 34,000. The non-combatant porters, stevedores and followers of the Military Labour Corps 600,000. Almost 50,000 of these men were lost, killed in action died of sickness or wounds" According to The Africa Research Institute official British figures the death toll exceeded 105,000 native African troops and military carriers
- Kramer gives 600,000 excess civilian deaths, of which 200,000 are due to the influenza pandemic, citing Brill’s Encyclopedia of the First World War, pp. 732–3.

^^{t}United States

- US Dept. of Defense figures from 2010, list 116,516 war dead from all causes for the period ending 31 December 1918, including 106,378 in the Army, 7,287 in the Navy and 2,851 in the Marine Corps. There were 53,402 battle deaths, including 50,510 in the Army, 431 in the navy and 2,461 in the Marines. There were 63,114 non-combat deaths, 55,868 in the Army, 6,856 in the Navy and 390 in the Marines. Wounded: 204,002 (Army: 193,663, Navy: 819, Marines: 9,520). The figures include 279 deaths during the Allied intervention in the Russian Civil War from 1918 to 1920. The U.S. casualty figures were revised by the US Dept. of Defense in 1957. The US Coast Guard lost 192 dead (111 deaths in action and 81 from other causes).
- United States War Dept. figures from 1924 for U.S. casualties were: total mobilized force 4,355,000; total casualties 350,300 (including killed and died from all causes 126,000; wounded 234,300 (including 14,500 died of wounds); prisoners and missing 4,500).
- In 1924, the U.S. government in a reply to a questionnaire from the International Labour Office, an agency of the League of Nations, reported 4,272,521 men mobilized and 67,813 dead and missing in World War I.
- United States civilian losses include 128 killed in the sinking of the RMS Lusitania (before the U.S. became a belligerent) as well as 629 Merchant Mariners killed in enemy submarine attacks on their merchant ships.

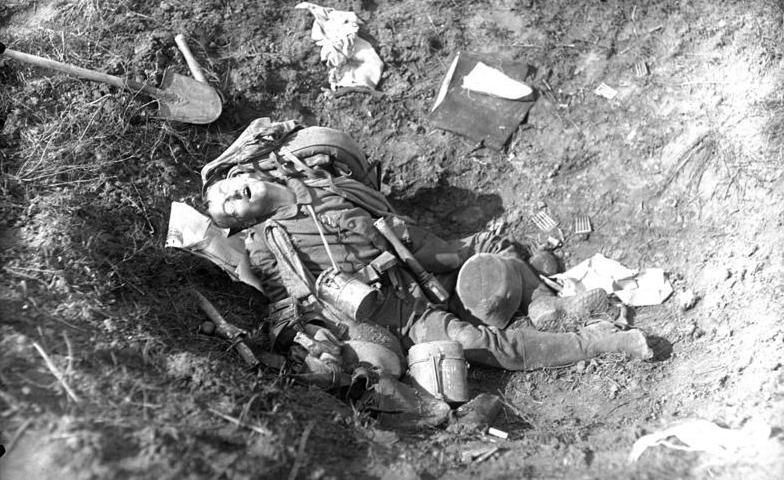
Fallen German soldier in France, 1917

^^{u} Austria-Hungary

- The official history of Austria-Hungary's involvement in the First World War put total military dead at 1,494,200: (1,016,200 killed and 478,000 while prisoners of war).
- In 1924, the Austrian government in a reply to a questionnaire from the International Labour Office, an agency of the League of Nations, reported 9,000,000 men mobilized and 1,542,817 dead and missing in World War I.
- United States War Dept. figures for Austro-Hungarian casualties are: total mobilized force 7,800,000; total casualties 7,020,000 (including killed and died 1,200,000; wounded 3,620,000; prisoners and missing 2,200,000).
- The UK War Office estimate for Austro-Hungarian casualties up to 31 December 1918: total casualties of 7,020,000 including 1,200,000 killed, 3,620,000 wounded and 2,200,000 prisoners. Preliminary figures up to the end of May 1918, given by the U. K. Director of Military Intelligence give the following estimated totals: 800,000 killed, 1,800,000 prisoners/missing, and 3,200,000 wounded/sick, for a total of 5,800,000. An additional 80,000 killed, 320,000 wounded/sick, and 20,000 prisoners are estimated in the Austrian offensive against Italy from 1 June to 24 October 1918. At the same time there 72,500 casualties on the Balkans and Western Fronts. Finally, during the last Italian offensive the prisoners claimed by the Italians amounted to 448,000, while a further 30,000 Austro-Hungarians were killed and 50,000 wounded.
- The Soviet demographer Boris Urlanis estimated that included in total Austro-Hungarian military deaths are 900,000 killed and died of wounds.
- A study published by the Carnegie Endowment for International Peace estimated that there were 467,000 civilian deaths attributable to wartime privations caused by the allied blockade.
- A Russian historian in a 2004 handbook of human losses in the 20th century estimated 120,000 civilian deaths due to military activity in Austro-Hungarian Galicia.

^^{v} Bulgaria

- United States War Dept. figures for Bulgarian casualties are: total mobilized force 1,200,000; total casualties 266,919 (including Killed and died 87,500; wounded 152,930; Prisoners and missing 27,029).
- The UK War Office listed casualties reported by the Bulgarian War Office: 87,500 total dead (48,917 killed, 13,198 died of wounds, 888? accidentally killed, 24,497 died of disease); 13,729 missing; 152,390 wounded and 10,623 prisoners. The Bulgarian War Office stated that "losses during the retreat from sickness and privations were much greater than the figures they possess".
- In 1924, the Bulgarian government in a reply to a questionnaire from the International Labour Office, an agency of the League of Nations, reported 400,000 men mobilized and 32,772 dead and missing in World War I.
- The Soviet demographer Boris Urlanis estimated that included in total Bulgarian military deaths are 62,000 killed and died of wounds.
- According to the Soviet demographer Boris Urlanis there were 100,000 civilian deaths due to wartime privations.

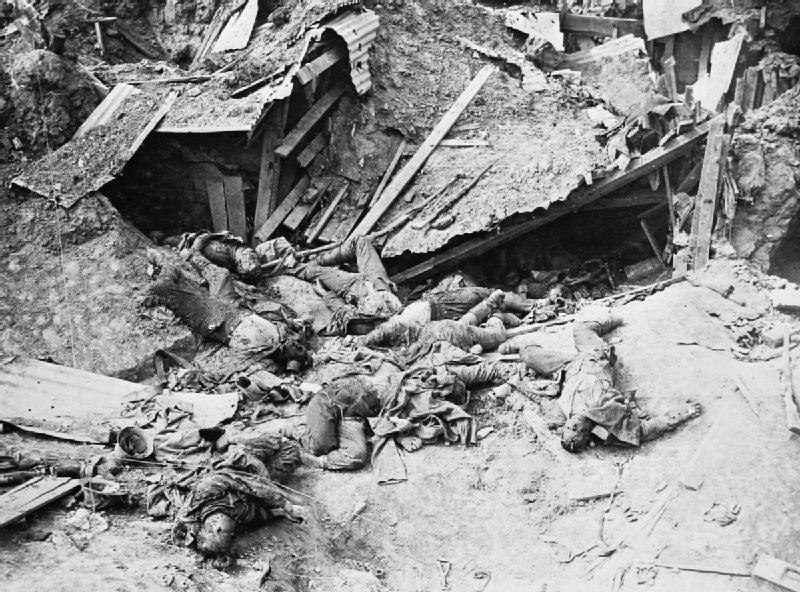
German dead scattered in the wreck of a machine gun post near Guillemont, 1916

^^{w} German Empire

- In 1934, the official German war history listed 2,037,000 military dead. Confirmed dead from all causes 1,936,897 (Army 1,900,876, Navy 34,836, Colonial troops 1,185); wounded 4,215,662; prisoners and missing 974,977 of which an estimated 100,000 were presumed dead.
- United States War Dept. figures for German casualties are: total mobilized force 11,000,000; total casualties 7,142,558 (including Killed and died 1,773,700; wounded 4,216,058; prisoners and missing 1,152,800).
- The UK War Office listed official German figures from 1921 of 1,808,545 killed and 4,247,143 wounded, exclusive of 14,000 African conscript deaths during the war.
- In 1924, the German government in a reply to a questionnaire from the International Labour Office, an agency of the League of Nations, reported 13,250,000 men mobilized and 2,000,000 dead and missing in World War I.
- The Soviet demographer Boris Urlanis estimated that included in total German military deaths are 1,796,000 killed and died of wounds.
- The UK War Office listed official German figures from 1919 of 720 German civilians who were killed by allied air raids.

- The figures for civilian deaths due to the Blockade of Germany are disputed. The German Board of Public Health in December 1918 maintained that 763,000 German civilians died from malnutrition and disease caused by the blockade up until the end of December 1918. A German academic study in 1928 put the death toll at 424,000. A study sponsored by the Carnegie Endowment for International Peace in 1940 estimated the German civilian death toll due to the war at over 600,000. Based on the above-mentioned German study of 1928, they maintained that "A thorough inquiry has led to the conclusion that the number of 'civilian' deaths traceable to the war was 424,000, to which number must be added about 200,000 deaths caused by the influenza epidemic". Finally, Kramer cites Jay Winter, who estimates 478,500 civilian war-related excess deaths, of which 180,000 were due to the influenza pandemic.

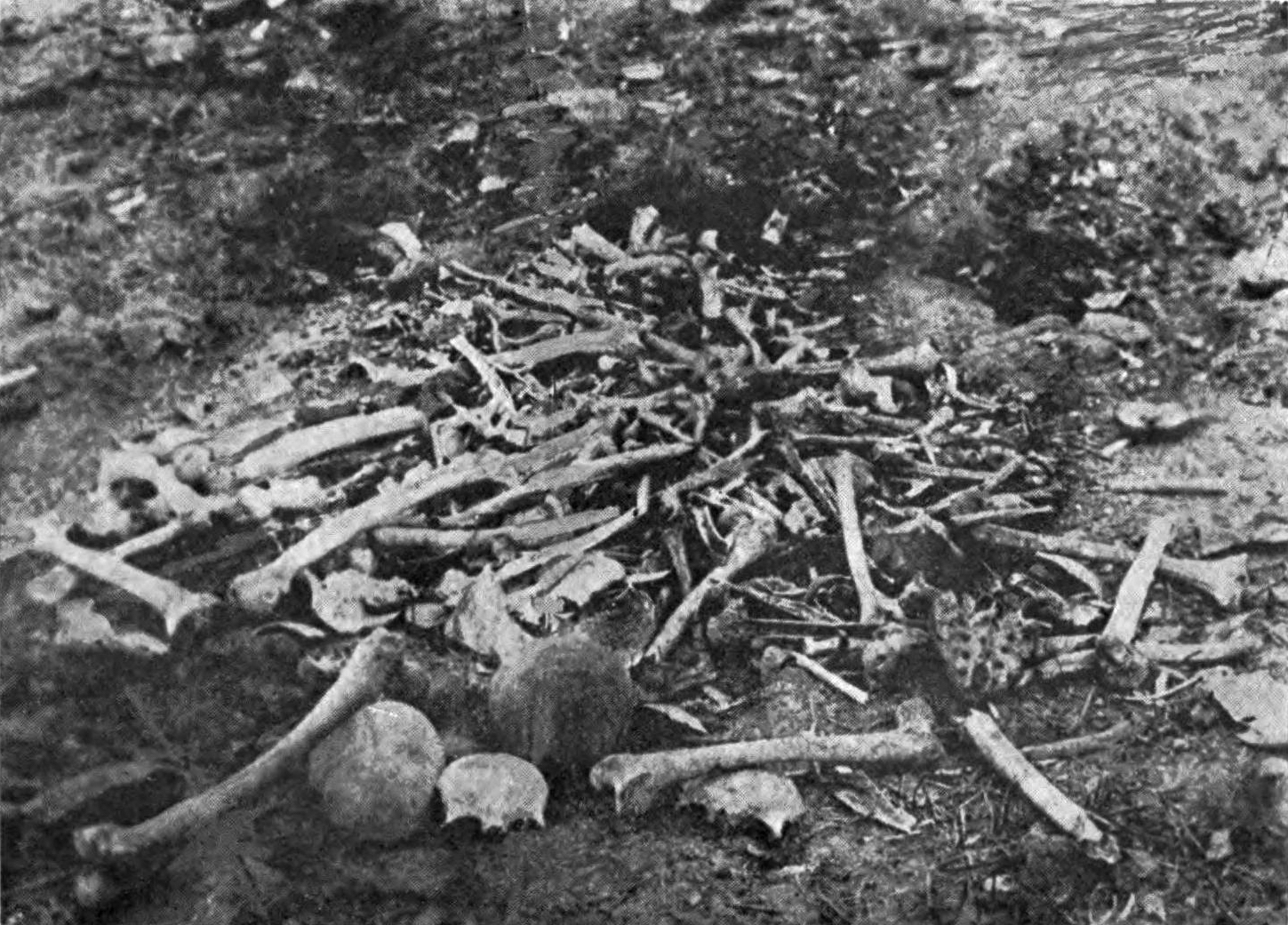
The remains of Armenians massacred at Erzinjan

^^{x} Ottoman Empire - Based on his analysis of the unpublished individual World War I campaign histories in the Ottoman Archives, Edward J. Erickson estimated Ottoman military casualties in the study Ordered to Die: A History of the Ottoman Army in the First World War. The casualties included total war dead of 771,844 (243,598 killed in action, 61,487 missing in action, and 466,759 deaths due to disease). The number of wounded was 763,753 and POWs 145,104. - The Ottoman official casualty statistics published in 1922 were: total dead 325,000 including killed in action 50,000, 35,000 died of wounds, and 240,000 died of disease. Wounded: 400,000. POWs, sick, and missing: 1,565,000. Total mobilized: 2,850,000.

- United States War Dept. figures for Ottoman casualties are: total mobilized force 2,850,000; total casualties 975,000 (including killed and died 325,000; wounded 400,000; prisoners and missing 250,000).
- The UK War Office figures for Ottoman casualties were: total accounted for 725,000 (killed 50,000, died of wounds 35,000, died of disease 400,000, wounded 400,000). Total unaccounted for: 1,565,000 (prisoners, deserters, invalids and missing).
- The Soviet demographer Boris Urlanis estimated that included in total Ottoman military deaths are 318,000 killed and died of wounds.
- Estimates of Ottoman civilian casualties in western sources range from 2,000,000 to 2,150,000. A Russian historian in a 2004 handbook of human losses in the 20th century estimated total Ottoman civilian dead from 1915 to 1918 at about 3.2 million including the deaths of 2.2 million Armenian, Assyrian, and Greek victims of genocides committed by the Ottomans and 1,000,000 war-related civilian deaths in the Ottoman Empire due to famine and disease.(In current borders Turkey 500,000; Syria 160,000; Lebanon 110,000; Iraq 150,000; Israel/Palestine 35,000 and Jordan 20,000) According to the BBC 200,000 persons perished in the Great Famine of Mount Lebanon during the war.
- Civilian casualties include the Armenian genocide. The total number of resulting Armenian deaths is generally held to have been 1.5 million. Other ethnic groups were similarly attacked by the Ottoman Empire during this period, including Assyrians and Greeks. Some scholars consider those events to be part of the same policy of extermination. The overwhelming majority of historians as well as academic institutions on Holocaust and Genocide Studies recognize the Armenian Genocide. "Despite the vast amount of evidence that points to the historical reality of the Armenian Genocide, eyewitness accounts, official archives, photographic evidence, the reports of diplomats, and the testimony of survivors, denial of the Armenian Genocide by successive regimes in Turkey has gone on from 1915 to the present".

^^{y} Denmark

- Denmark was neutral in the war but Germany at that time included part of Danish Schleswig. Men from this area were conscripted into the German forces and their losses are included with German casualties. Over 700 Danish merchant sailors and fisherman died, mostly due to vessels torpedoed by German submarines.
- The Danish National Archives estimated the losses of Danes in the German forces at 6,000.

^^{j} Luxembourg

- Luxembourg remained under German occupation during the war. The government, led by Paul Eyschen, chose to remain neutral. This strategy had the approval of Marie-Adélaïde, Grand Duchess of Luxembourg. Some citizens were conscripted into the German forces and others escaped to volunteer for the Allies. According to the Mobile Reference travel Guide, 3,700 Luxembourgeois citizens served in the French armed forces and 2,800 gave their lives in the war. They are commemorated at the Gëlle Fra in Luxembourg.

^^{z}Norway

- Norway was neutral in the war but lost ships and merchant sailors in trading through the war zones. Norway is at times referred to as the Neutral Ally due to its close relationship with the United Kingdom during the war. In 1924, the Norwegian government in a reply to a questionnaire from the International Labour Office, an agency of the League of Nations, reported 1,180 persons dead and missing in World War I.

^^{az}Qajar Persia

- Though Qajar Persia maintained a neutral stance, the country was divided into many factions and militaries, some allying with the Allied powers such as the Persian Cossack Brigade and others with the Central Powers such as the Persian Central Government Gendarmerie and Khamseh Tribesmen. The presence of British and Russian troops led to blockades of food distribution, which culminated into the Persian famine of 1917–1919, which under most modern estimates caused two million deaths.

^^{bz}Sweden

- Sweden was neutral in the war but lost ships and merchant sailors in trading through the war zones. In 1924, the Swedish government in a reply to a questionnaire from the International Labour Office, an agency of the League of Nations, reported 800 persons dead and missing in World War I.

^^{cz}Albania

- Albania was invaded and occupied by both Allied and Central powers despite its neutrality. During occupation, Albanians were massacred on numerous occasions, both inside and outside of Albania. The total number of Albanian deaths due to disease and fighting is approximately 70,000 according to Spencer C. Tucker, roughly 8.75% to 10% of the pre-war population. The number of Albanians that died due to famine, however, is unknown, but contemporary estimates by the American Red Cross indicate a death toll of 150,000 in 1915, resulting in 200,000 refugees.

^^{dz}Liechtenstein

- Liechtenstein was neutral in the war yet held sympathies to the Central Powers, particularly Austria-Hungary. As such, a number of Liechtensteiner citizens volunteered for both the German and Austro-Hungarian armies, of which 4 were confirmed to have been killed.
- Foreign nationals living in Liechtenstein who were conscripted into the armies of their home countries are not counted.

== Sources ==
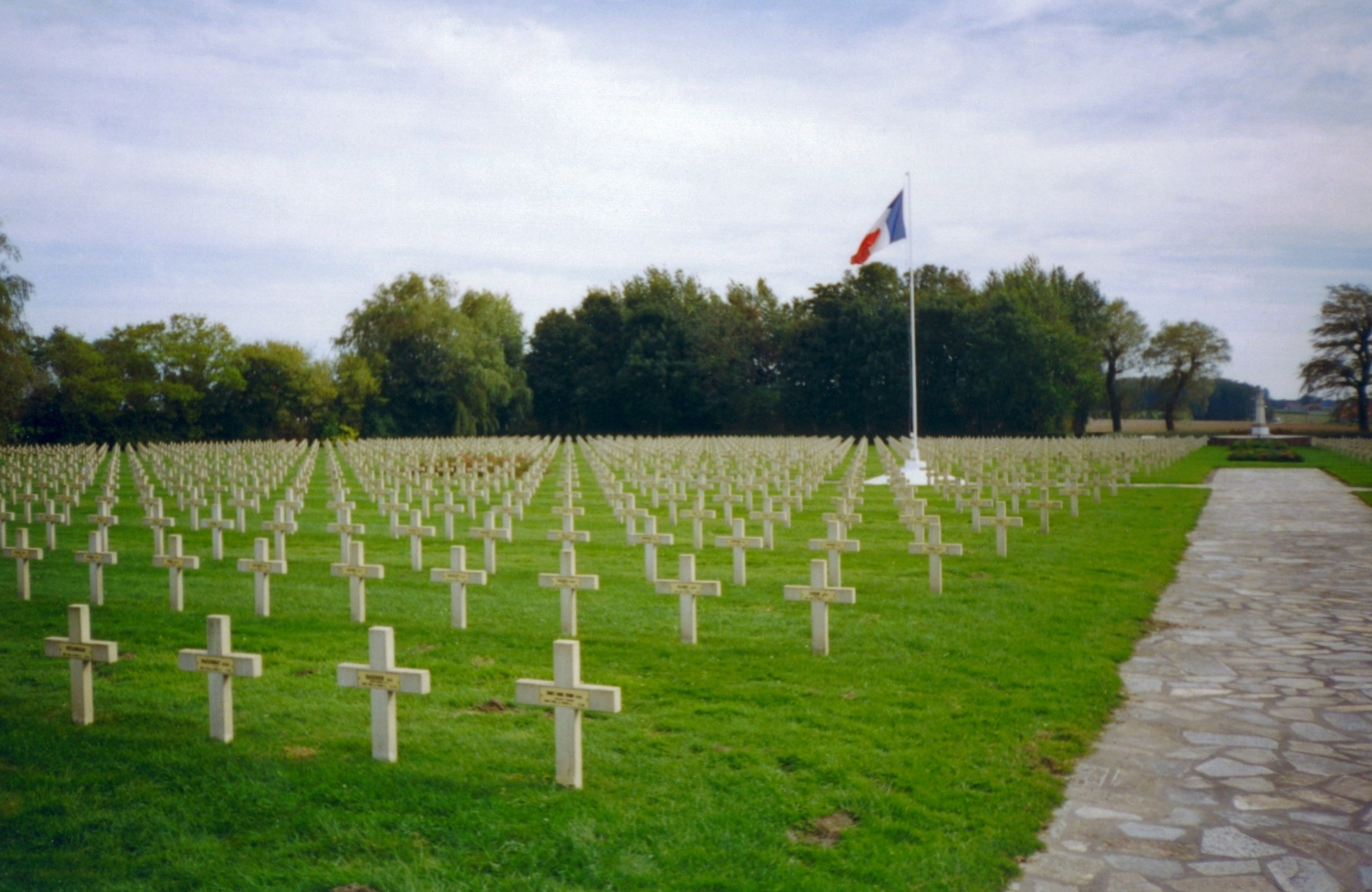
Graves of French soldiers who died on the Ypres Salient, Ypres Necropole National, Ypres, Belgium

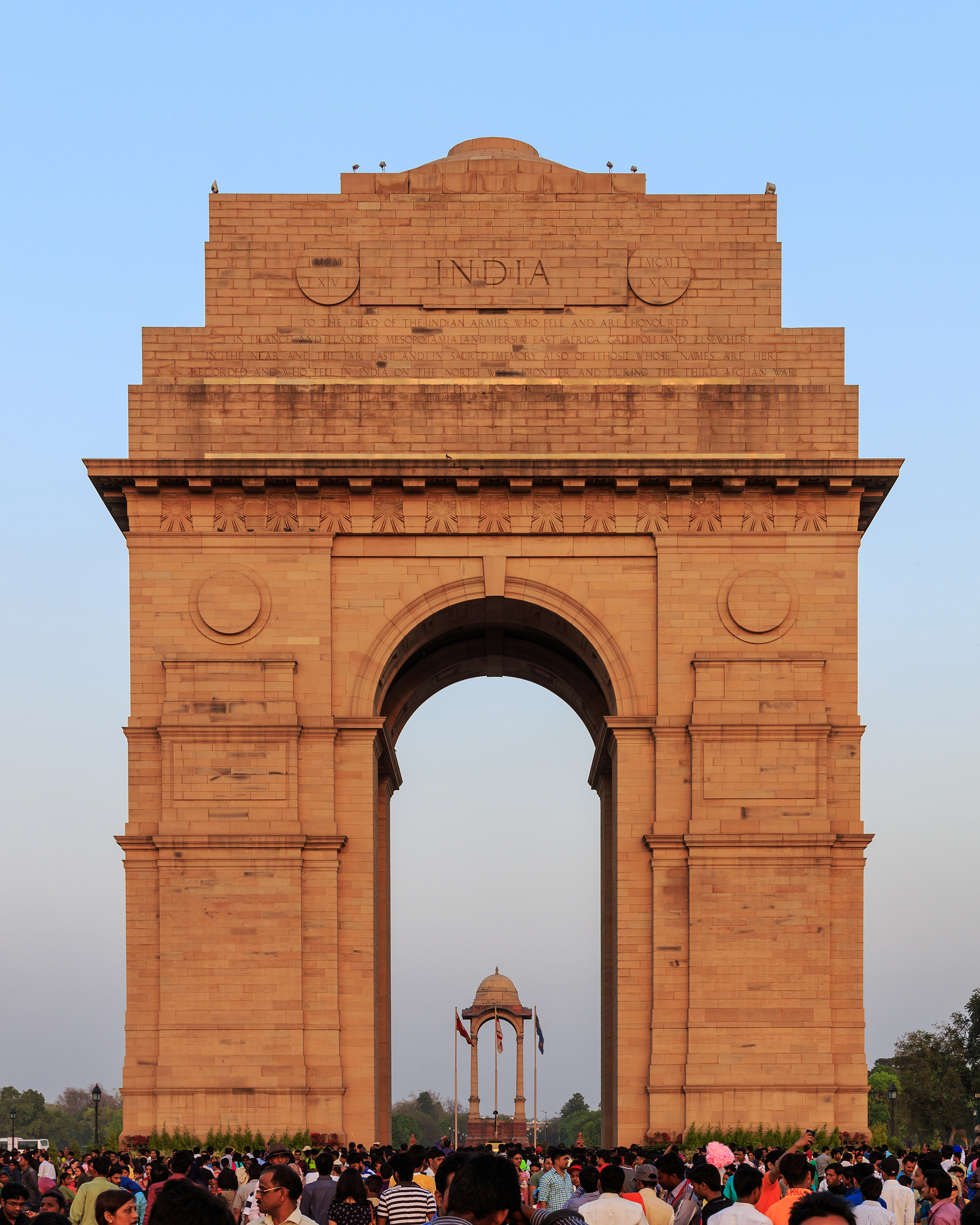
The India Gate in Delhi commemorates the Indian soldiers who died during World War I.

- The Commonwealth War Graves Commission (CWGC) Annual Report 2014–2015 provides current statistics on the military dead for the British Empire. The war dead totals listed in the report are based on the research by the CWGC to identify and commemorate Commonwealth war dead. The statistics tabulated by The Commonwealth War Graves Commission are representative of the number of names commemorated for all servicemen/women of the Armed Forces of the Commonwealth and former UK Dependencies, whose death was attributable to their war service. Some auxiliary and civilian organizations are also accorded war grave status if death occurred under certain specified conditions. For the purposes of CWGC the dates of inclusion for Commonwealth War Dead are 4 August 1914 to 31 August 1921. Total World War I dead were 1,116,371 (UK and former colonies 887,711; Undivided India 73,895; Canada 64,997; Australia 62,123; New Zealand 18,053; South Africa 9,592). The Commonwealth War Graves Commission figures also include the Merchant Navy.
- Statistics of the Military Effort of the British Empire During the Great War 1914–1920, The War Office March 1922. This official report lists Army casualties (including Royal Naval Division) of 908,371 killed in action, died of wounds, died as prisoners of war and were missing in action from 4 August 1914 to 31 December 1920, (British Isles 702,410; India 64,449; Canada 56,639; Australia 59,330; New Zealand 16,711; South Africa 7,121 and Newfoundland 1,204, other colonies 507). Figures of the Royal Navy war dead and missing of 32,287 were listed separately. These figures do not include the Merchant Navy dead of 14,661.
  The losses of France, Belgium, Italy, Portugal, Romania, Serbia, Greece, Russia, the USA, Bulgaria, Germany, Austria-Hungary and Turkey were also listed in the UK War Office report.
- The official "final and corrected" casualty figures for British Army, including the Territorial Force (not including allied British Empire forces) were issued on 10 March 1921. The losses were for the period 4 August 1914 until 30 September 1919, included 573,507 "killed in action, died from wounds and died of other causes"; 254,176 missing less 154,308 released prisoners; for a net total of 673,375 dead and missing. There were 1,643,469 wounded also listed in the report.
- Sources for British Empire casualties are divergent and contradictory. The report of the War Office published in 1922 put the total number of British Empire "soldiers who lost their lives" at 908,371. On a separate schedule the War Office listed the losses of the Royal Navy at 32,237 dead and missing. It is implicit in this presentation that the figures for "soldiers who lost their lives" do not include the Royal Navy. However many published reference works list total British Empire (including the Dominions) losses at 908,371, it is implicit in these presentations that the figures for total losses include the Royal Navy.
- The War Office report puts the number of "soldiers who lost their lives" from the British Regular Army and Royal Naval Division at 702,410. This is not in agreement with the "final and corrected" figures in the 1921 report for the army published in the General Annual Report of the British Army 1912–1919, which put British Army dead and missing at 673,375 and the official compilation of Army war dead published in 1921 that put total losses at about 673,000. The War Office report did not explain the reason for this discrepancy; the difference is more than likely due to their inclusion of the Royal Naval Division and deaths outside of combat theaters.
- Casualties and Medical Statistics published in 1931. was the final volume of the Official Medical History of the War, gives British Empire, including the Dominions, for Army losses by cause of death. Total war dead in combat theaters from 1914 to 1918 were 876,084, which included 418,361 killed, 167,172 died of wounds, 113,173 died of disease or injury, 161,046 missing and presumed dead and 16,332 prisoner of war deaths. Also listed were 2,004,976 wounded and 6,074,552 sick and injured. Total losses were not broken out for the UK and each Dominion, the figures are for losses in combat theaters only and do not include casualties of forces stationed in the UK from accidents or disease, casualties of the Royal Naval Division are also not included in these figures; the losses of the Gallipoli Campaign are for British forces only, since records for Dominion forces were incomplete. Figures do not include the Royal Navy.
- Military Casualties–World War–Estimated, Statistics Branch, General Staff, U.S. War Department, 25 February 1924. This report prepared by the U.S. War Department estimated the casualties of the belligerents in the war. The figures from this report are listed in the Encyclopædia Britannica and often cited in historical literature.
- Huber, Michel, La Population de la France pendant la guerre, Paris 1931. This study published by the Carnegie Endowment for International Peace, lists official French government figures for war-related military deaths and missing of France and its colonies.
- Mortara, Giorgio, La Salute pubblica in Italia durante e dopo la Guerra, New Haven: Yale University Press 1925. The official government Italian statistics on war dead are listed here. A brief summary of data from this report can be found online. go to Vol 13, No. 15
- The demographer Boris Urlanis, analysis of the military dead for the belligerents in the war including his estimates for the combat related deaths included in total deaths.
- The Belgian government published statistics on their war losses in the Annuaire statistique de la Belgique et du Congo Belge 1915–1919.
- Heeres-Sanitätsinspektion im Reichskriegsministeriums, Sanitätsbericht über das deutsche Heer, (Deutsches Feld- und Besatzungsheer), im Weltkriege 1914–1918, Volume 3, Sec. 1, Berlin 1934. The official German Army medical war history listed German losses.
- Grebler, Leo and Wilhelm Winkler, The Cost of the World War to Germany and Austria-Hungary. This study published by the Carnegie Endowment for International Peace details the losses of Austria-Hungary and Germany in the war.
- Erickson, Edward J., Ordered to Die: A History of the Ottoman Army in the First World War. The author's estimates were made based on data from official Ottoman sources.
- Hersch, Liebmann, La mortalité causée par la guerre mondiale, Metron. The International Review of Statistics, 1927, Vol 7. No 1. This study published in an academic journal, detailed the demographic impact of the war on France, the UK, Italy, Belgium, Portugal, Serbia, Romania and Greece. The total estimated increase in the number of civilian deaths due to the war was 2,171,000, not including an additional 984,000 Spanish flu deaths. These losses were due primarily to wartime privations.
- Dumas, Samuel (1923). Losses of Life Caused by War, published by Oxford University Press. This study detailed the impact of the war on the civilian population. The study estimated excess civilian deaths at: France (264,000 to 284,000), the UK (181,000), Italy (324,000) and Germany (692,000).
- The International Labour Office, an agency of the League of Nations, published statistics on the military dead and missing for the belligerents in the war.

The source of population data is:

- Haythornthwaite, Philip J., The World War One Source Book pp. 382–383

== See also ==
- General Pershing WWI casualty list
- List of nurses who died in World War I
- Thankful Villages – villages in England and Wales which lost no men in World War I
- World War I memorials
- World War II casualties
