= Edward J. Erickson =

American Army officer and historian

Edward J. Erickson is a retired regular U.S. Army officer at the Marine Corps University who has written widely on the Ottoman Army during World War I. He is an associate of International Research Associates, Seattle, Washington and as of July 2016 was also listed as an advisory board member of the Ankara-based, Turkish government aligned think-tank, Avrasya Incelemeleri Merkezi (AVIM), which goes by the English name Center for Eurasian Studies.

He has been criticized for his writings denying the Armenian genocide, instead presenting the events as a counterinsurgency campaign.

== Biography ==
Erickson was born in Norwich, New York. After military service as an infantry non-commissioned officer, he was commissioned in the Field Artillery in 1975. During his military career, Erickson served with the 509th Airborne Infantry Battalion, the 8th Infantry Division (Mechanized), the 24th Infantry Division, the 528th Field Artillery Group, and the 42nd Field Artillery Brigade. During the Persian Gulf War, he served as the Operations Officer (S3) of the 2nd Battalion, 3rd Field Artillery in the 3rd Armored Division at the Battle of Wadi Al Batin. In the latter phase of his career, he served in NATO assignments in İzmir, Turkey and in Naples, Italy as a Foreign area officer specializing in Turkey and the Middle East. In 1995, he was assigned to the NATO Headquarters in Sarajevo, Bosnia and Herzegovina, where he served as a Military Assistant to the Commander, Implementation Force (IFOR) (COMIFOR).

Erickson retired in October 1997 to teach world history at Norwich High School, but was recalled to active duty in March 2003 for Operation Iraqi Freedom and was assigned as the Political Advisor to Major General Ray Odierno, 4th Infantry Division. After six months in Tikrit, Iraq, Erickson returned to civilian life. During his military service, Erickson was awarded the Legion of Merit and the Bronze Star Medal with Oak Leaf Cluster. In 2005, he received a Ph.D. in history at the University of Leeds in the United Kingdom. From 2007 to 2008, Erickson was professor of political science in the Iraqi Ministry of Defense, Baghdad, Iraq. Erickson retired as a full professor of military history after teaching for eight years in the War Studies Department at the Command and Staff College, Marine Corps University in Quantico, Virginia from 2009 to 2017 and is now an independent scholar.

== Views on the Armenian genocide ==
Erickson claims in various publications that the Armenian genocide relocation of the eastern Ottoman Armenians was a result of a military decision process. In 2004, Vahakn Dadrian published a review of Erickson's Ordered to Die. A History of the Ottoman Army in the First World War in the Journal of Political and Military Sociology, characterizing it as "methodologically contaminated" due to the source material (Turkish military archives) and Erickson's relationship to that material. Erickson responded two years later in a letter to the Journal of Political and Military Sociology, explaining the delay as due to being in Iraq and labeling Dadrian's allegations as "deliberate obfuscations, misquotes, and slanderous comments." The journal did not publish the letter.

Erickson's article on Ottoman military policy was also critiqued in an article published in 2014 in Genocide Studies International for an error concerning Armenian volunteer units that fought with the Russian Army. Erickson claimed that they were made up entirely of Ottoman Armenian citizens who had crossed the border into Russia, a claim that is "flatly contradicted by many sources showing that the four volunteer regiments formed were composed primarily of Russian Armenians." The claim is also contradicted by Erickson's earlier 2001 book.

Richard Hovannisian reads the title of the book Ottomans and Armenians as "clearly indicating that, like the Young Turk dictators in their ideological exclusion of Armenians from true Ottoman society, the author does not regard the Armenians as being bona fide Ottoman citizens but, instead, as an internal alien element". Hovannisian also criticizes the book for factual accuracy, stating "The questionable or spurious assertions made in Ottomans and Armenians are far too numerous to list in their entirety."

Erickson "enthusiastically recommend[ed]" a book by the Turkish diplomat Yücel Güçlü, whose main purpose was to deny the Armenian genocide, a recommendation which was criticized in the International Journal of Middle East Studies in 2013.

== Writings ==
- The Euphrates Triangle: Security Implications of the Southeast Anatolia Project, co-author with F.M. Lorenz, Natl Defense Univ Pr, (1999), ISBN 1-57906-021-8
- Ordered to Die: A History of the Ottoman Army in the First World War, Greenwood Press (2000), ISBN 0-313-31516-7
- Defeat in Detail: The Ottoman Army in the Balkans, 1912–1913, Praeger Publishers (2003), ISBN 0-275-97888-5
- "Turkey as regional hegemon—2014: strategic implications for the United States," Turkish Studies, V-3, 2004, pp. 25–45.
- Ottoman Army Effectiveness in World War I: A Comparative Study, Routledge (2007), ISBN 978-0-415-77099-6
- Gallipoli & The Middle East 1914–1918, London, Amber Books (2008), ISBN 978-1-906626-15-0
- A Military History of the Ottomans, From Osman to Atatürk, co-author with Mesut Uyar, Westport, Connecticut, Praeger Publishers (2009), ISBN 978-0-275-98876-0
- By the Light of a Candle. The Diaries of a Reserve Officer in the Ottoman Army - First World War Diaries and Other Records of the Period of 1915-1919, Istanbul-Piscataway (New Jersey): The Isis Press/Gorgias Press, 2009 (introduction and comments).
- Gallipoli, The Ottoman Campaign, Barnsley, UK, Pen and Sword Books (2010), ISBN 978-1-84415-967-3
- "Template for Destruction: The Congress of Berlin and the Evolution of Ottoman Counterinsurgency Practices," in Hakan Yavuz et Peter Slugett (ed.), War and Diplomacy. The Russo-Turkish War of 1877–1878 and the Treaty of Berlin, Salt Lake City: University of Utah Press, 2011.
- "In the Nick of Time: Transformation in the Ottoman Army, 1911," in Peter Dennis and Jeffrey Grey (ed.), 1911 Preliminary Moves. The 2011 Chief of Army History Conference, Canberra: Big Sky Publishing, 2011.
- Mustafa Kemal Atatürk, Oxford-New York, Osprey Publishing, 2013.
- Ottomans and Armenians. A Study in Counter-Insurgency, New York, Palgrave MacMillan, 2013. ISBN 978-1137362209
- Strategic Water, Iraq and Security Planning in the Euphrates-Tigris Basin, co-author with F.M. Lorenz, Quantico, Marine Corps University Press, 2014. ISBN 978-1782666837
- Gallipoli, Command Under Fire, Oxford, Osprey Press, 2015. ISBN 978-1472806697
- Palestine, The Ottoman Campaigns of 1914-1918, Barnsley, UK, Pen and Sword Publishing, 2016. ISBN 978-1473827370
- A Soldier's Kipling, Poetry and the Profession of Arms, Barnsley, UK, Pen and Sword Publishing, 2018. ISBN 978-1526718532
- A History of Relocation in Counterinsurgency Warfare, London: Bloomsbury Academic, 2020. ISBN 9781350062580
- Phase Line Attila, The Amphibious Campaign for Cyprus, 1974, co-author with Mesut Uyar, Quantico, VA: Marine Corps University Press, 2020. ISBN 9781732003088

== Military awards ==
- Bronze Star Medal (1st Oak Leaf) – Fourth Infantry Division, Tikrit, Iraq, 2003
- Bronze Star Medal – Third Armored Division, Safwan, Iraq, 1991
- Legion of Merit – NATO Hqs, Naples, Italy, 1997
- Joint Service Commendation Medal – NATO Hqs, Sarajevo, Bosnia, 1996
- Defense Meritorious Service Medal – NATO Hqs, Izmir, Turkey, 1994
- Meritorious Service Medal – Germany, Turkey, USA
- Army Commendation Medal – Germany, USA
