= Ordered to Die =

2001 book by Edward J. Erickson

- Author: Edward J. Erickson
- Original title: Ordered to Die: a history of the Ottoman army in the First World War
- Language: English
- Genre: War; Historical non-fiction
- Publisher: Greenwood Publishing
- Publication date: 2001
- Publication place: United States
- Media type: Hardcover
- Pages: 265
- ISBN: 978-0-313-31516-9

Ordered to Die: a history of the Ottoman army in the First World War is an account of the Ottoman Empire's military engagements in World War I (specifically the Middle Eastern theatre of World War I), fought between the Allies (led by Britain and Russia) and the Central Powers. It was written by Edward J. Erickson. It was divided into seven sections, beginning with prewar military issues.

== Synopsis ==
Erickson relies heavily on non-published official histories that were not open to non-Turkish historian in the Ottoman Archives until the late 1980s and Turkish general staff archives, which have very limited access as of 2008. He also uses a limited number of Ottoman Turkish documents. Erickson's book is mostly on the strategic and operational level of the Ottoman Army. The book describes the tactics, social issues and the humanitarian dimensions of the Ottoman Army's engagements.

Ordered to die presents sets of data on subjects such as the Ottoman army organisation, the structure of the General Staff and headquarters, German military assistance and Ottoman casualty figures.

The overall conclusion is that the Ottoman army’s record in World War I was an astounding achievement. The book says it was a "saga of fortitude and resilience".

== Critical reviews ==
Erik-Jan Zürcher argues that Ordered to die is nicely presented, with useful tables and a number of photographs, but he concludes that Ordered to die is a book with a clear but limited purpose. He states that the book presents a purely military history of the Ottoman war effort in the English language, where histories of this type have so far only been available in French or Turkish.
