= Avetis Nazarbekian =

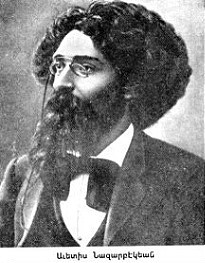
- Born: 1866; Tabriz, Qajar Iran
- Died: 1939 (aged 72–73); Moscow, Russian SFSR, Soviet Union
- Other names: Nazarbek, Lerents, Avo
- Education: Saint Petersburg Imperial University University of Paris (Sorbonne)
- Occupations: poet, journalist, political activist and revolutionary
- Known for: one of the founders of the Social Democrat Hunchakian Party
- Partner: Mariam Vardanian

Avetis Vardani Nazarbekian (Armenian: Ավետիս Վարդանի Նազարբեկյան, (Note: Traditional orthography: Աւետիս Վարդանի Նազարբէկեան) 1866–1939), also known as Nazarbek, Avo and Lerents, was an Iranian Armenian poet, journalist, political activist and revolutionary. He was one of the founders of the Social Democrat Hunchakian Party.

== Biography ==
Nazarbekian was born in Tabriz, Qajar Iran, but moved to the Russian Empire as a child and received his education there. (Note: Armenian encyclopedias give his birthplace as Tiflis.) He attended the male gymnasium in Tiflis. He then studied at Saint Petersburg Imperial University and the Sorbonne. His studies were financed by his uncle, the wealthy Tiflis Armenian capitalist Melikazarian. He focused on social sciences, familiarizing himself with contemporary economic and political theories. In the mid-1880s, he contributed to Mkrtich Portukalian's revolutionary newspaper Armenia. Nazarbekian supported Portukalian's idea of creating an Armenian organization to engage in revolutionary struggle in the Ottoman Empire. While in Paris, he met Mariam Vardanian (later known as Maro Nazarbek), a fellow student who had been a part of a revolutionary circle in Saint Petersburg; they were soon engaged.

Avetis and Mariam Nazarbekian traveled from Paris to Geneva in the summer of 1886. There, they met a number of Russian Armenian students, with whom they discussed the situation in Ottoman Armenia and the need for a revolutionary organization. Nazarbekian wrote to Mkrtich Portukalian on the creation of such an organization, but was disappointed by Portukalian's response. Nazarbekian and the other students decided to form their own party, drafting a plan which declared the independence of Ottoman Armenia as the party's immediate goal and the establishment of a socialist society as its future goal. In 1887, Nazarbekian, Mariam Vardanian and their Russian-Armenian comrades Gevorg Gharajian, Kristapor Ohanian, Ruben Khan-Azat and Gabriel Kafian founded the Hunchakian party and the Hunchak ('Bell') newspaper in Geneva. The Hunchakian party would become the first socialist party in the Ottoman Empire and Iran. Nazarbekian also established close contacts with Russian socialist Georgi Plekhanov and his Emancipation of Labour group.

In the following years, the Hunchakian party carried out revolutionary actions in the Ottoman Empire with the goal of causing a European intervention on behalf of the Armenians. Their activities often provoked brutal reprisals by the Ottoman authorities against Armenians and largely failed to bring about the desired European intervention or reforms. In 1896, Nazarbekian came under criticism by an opposing faction within the party which blamed him for the party's failures. This faction sought to remove socialism from the party's program and criticized Nazarbekian for advocating reckless insurrections. After the party split in 1896, Nazarbekian led the left-wing, socialist faction of the party. The Hunchakian party was significantly weakened by this split and was less active after 1896.

Nazarbekian began a book series called Socialist Library (Sots’ialistakan gradaran), in which he published several works of Karl Marx, Friedrich Engels, Ferdinand Lassalle, Paul Lafargue and Plekhanov in Armenian translation. He personally knew Engels and Lafargue, as well as other prominent socialists such as Jean Jaurès, Karl Kautsky, Vladimir Lenin and Jules Guesde. He published the journal Gaghapar ('Idea') in Athens in 1894, then started the satirical political journal Aptak ('Slap'), which was published first in Athens and then in London until 1897. In 1904, he founded the weekly Veratsnut’yun ('Rebirth') in Bulgaria. He discussed the Armenian question with Lenin and Stepan Shaumian. In 1923, he moved from Paris to the United States and joined the US Communist (Workers) Party, forming an Armenian section within it. He participated in the efforts of the Aid Committee of Armenia (Hayastani ognut’yan komite) and the publication of the newspapers Yeritasard Hayastan ('Young Armenia') and Shinarar ('Builder'). In 1934, he moved to the Soviet Union and joined the Communist Party. He died in Moscow in 1939.

Nazarbekian also wrote poetry under the pen name Lerents. His poems have to do with the difficult state of the Armenian people and their struggle for liberty.

== Personal life ==
Avetis Nazarbekian married his fellow revolutionary Mariam Vardanian not long after meeting her as a student. They had two children together, a son and a daughter. The couple eventually divorced, after which Avetis married his cousin. The English writer David Garnett knew Avetis and Maro Nazarbekian while they were living in London and describes them in his autobiography The Golden Echo: "Avetis Nazarbek was dark, slender, very handsome in an oriental style, and played the violin. Murro [sic], his wife, was a dark moody woman with a sallow skin, so devoured by jealousy that she could scarcely endure watching Avetis speak to another woman and was convinced he was being unfaithful if he was out of her sight for more than five minutes."

== Works ==
- Ազատ ժամեր, Azat zhamer, 'Free Hours', Tiflis, 1883 (verse, in Armenian)
- Նոր հոսանք և բաց նամակ հայաստանցիներին, Nor hosank’ yev bats’ namak hayastants’inerin, 'New Current and Open Letter to the Armenians', Geneva, 1889 (in Armenian)
- Բանաստեղծութիւններ, Banasteghtsut’yunner, 'Poems', Saint Petersburg, 1890 (verse, in Armenian)
- Աւազակը, Avazakë, 'The Bandit', Athens, 1892 (poem, in Armenian)
- Մարտում, In Battle, 'Martum', Athens, 1893 (verse, in Armenian)
- Հայերն Ամերիկայում, Hayern Amerikayum, 'Armenians in America', Athens, 1893 (in Armenian)
- Նուագ և մեղեդի, Nvag yev meghedi, 'Tune and Melody', London, 1895 (verse, in Armenian)
- Through the Storm: Pictures of Life in Armenia, London, 1899 (in English, translated by L. M. Elton)
- Դարբնեւոր, Darbnevor, 'Blacksmith', Rusçuk, 1904 (poem, in Armenian)
