= Alexander Atabekian =

Armenian anarchist writer (1868–1933)

Doctor Alexander Atabekian
- Ալեքսանդր Աթաբեկյան
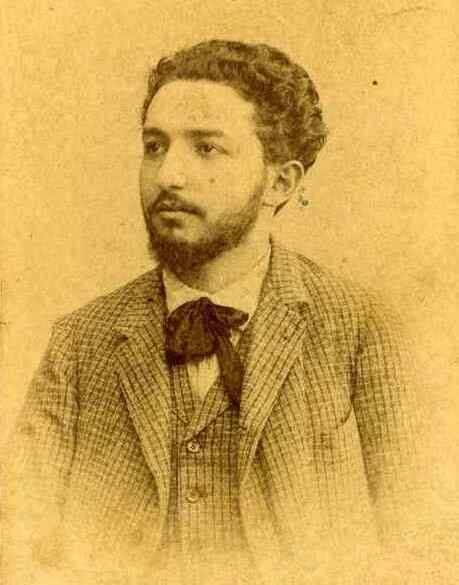
- Atabekian (1890s)
- Born: 2 February 1869; Shusha, Elizavetpol, Russian Empire
- Died: 5 December 1933 (aged 64); Moscow, Russian SFSR, Soviet Union
- Education: University of Geneva
- Occupations: Physician; author; publisher
- Years active: 1889—1925
- Notable work: The Anarchist Library (1891—1894); Hamaink (1894); Anarkhiia (1917—1918); Pochin (1919—1922)
- Political party: Social Democrat Hunchakian Party (1889–1890); Armenian Revolutionary Federation (1890–1896)
- Other political affiliations: Moscow Federation of Anarchist Groups (1917–1918)
- Movement: Armenian national movement, anarchist communism
- Spouse: Ekaterina Nikolaevna Sokolova (m. 1894; died 1922)
- Children: 3
- Family: Atabekian

Alexander Movsesi Atabekian (Armenian: Ալեքսանդր Մովսեսի Աթաբեկյան; 2 February 1869 – 5 December 1933) was an Armenian physician, publisher and anarchist communist.

Born in the region of Nagorno-Karabakh, he moved abroad to study medicine, enrolling in the University of Geneva in Switzerland. There he began working as a typesetter and became experienced in publishing while working on the journal Hunchak, the organ of the Social Democrat Hunchakian Party (SDHP). In 1890, he became a disciple of the Russian anarchist Peter Kropotkin and joined the anarchist movement. In Geneva, Atabekian established the Anarchist Library, which published several seminal anarchist texts in the Armenian and Russian languages, with the intention of smuggling them into the Russian Empire. He also made links with the nascent Armenian Revolutionary Federation (ARF), helping to set up publication of its newspaper Droshak in Geneva.

He pursued his medical studies to Paris, where he began publishing the journal Hamaink, the first anarchist periodical in the Armenian language. He wrote extensively about the oppression of Armenians by the Ottoman Empire and European countries and elaborated his vision for a social revolution in Armenia. He ceased publication after hearing news of the Hamidian massacres, after which he re-established connections with other anarchists within the ARF. Together they issued a declaration to the Second International, denouncing both the actions of the Ottoman Empire and the complicity of its European allies. After graduating as a Doctor of Medicine, Atabekian moved to Rasht, in Iran, where he worked as a physician and published a Persian edition of Hamaink. He also worked as a combat medic during World War I, during which he treated refugees that had fled the Armenian genocide.

Following the Russian Revolution of 1917, he moved to Moscow and began writing works of anarchist theory and critique. He was critical of the rise of the Bolsheviks, whom he saw as working in opposition to the will of the people. He instead advocated for the strengthening of the co-operative movement, seeing particular promise in Moscow's house committees as a means to establish socialist anarchism. He also acted as Kropotkin's personal doctor and confidant, staying by his side until his death. He then participated in the management of a museum of Kropotkin, which he maintained throughout the period of the New Economic Policy (NEP).

Atabekian suffered a stroke and died in his home in Moscow in 1933, although reference literature would end up reporting that he had died in the Gulag, following the repression of the anarchist movement during Joseph Stalin's rise to power. He has since been held as a key example of an anarchist from outside the Western tradition, and his work on anti-authoritarianism, co-operative economics and tenants rights has been studied in Russia and Ukraine.

== Biography ==
=== Early life and activism ===
Alexander Movsesi Atabekian was born on 2 February 1869, (Note: Other sources say he was born in 1868.) in Shushi, a city in the region of Nagorno-Karabakh. He was born into an Armenian noble family and was the son of a physician.

After he graduated from secondary school in his hometown, in 1889, he left the Caucasus and went abroad to study medicine at the University of Geneva. During his undergraduate education, Atabekian worked as a typesetter for Avetis Nazarbekian's newspaper Hunchak – the official organ of the Social Democrat Hunchakian Party (SDHP) – which publicised reports about rising anti-Armenian sentiment in the Russian and Ottoman Empires.

He left the SDHP and became an anarchist communist in 1890, after reading Words of a Rebel, a collection of writings by Peter Kropotkin. Atabekian then began working at a Ukrainian publishing house, which he used to print translations of anarchist works in the Armenian and Russian languages. He also published a number of open letters, on behalf of the international anarchist movement, to Armenian peasants and revolutionaries.

Before long, Atabekian had met numerous prominent members of the anarchist movement, becoming close friends with Kropotkin, Reclus and Jean Grave. He also met Max Nettlau, Paraskev Stoyanov, Luigi Galleani and Jacques Gross; with whom he printed a poster in memory of the Haymarket martyrs, which they plastered throughout Geneva.

=== Anarchist publishing work ===
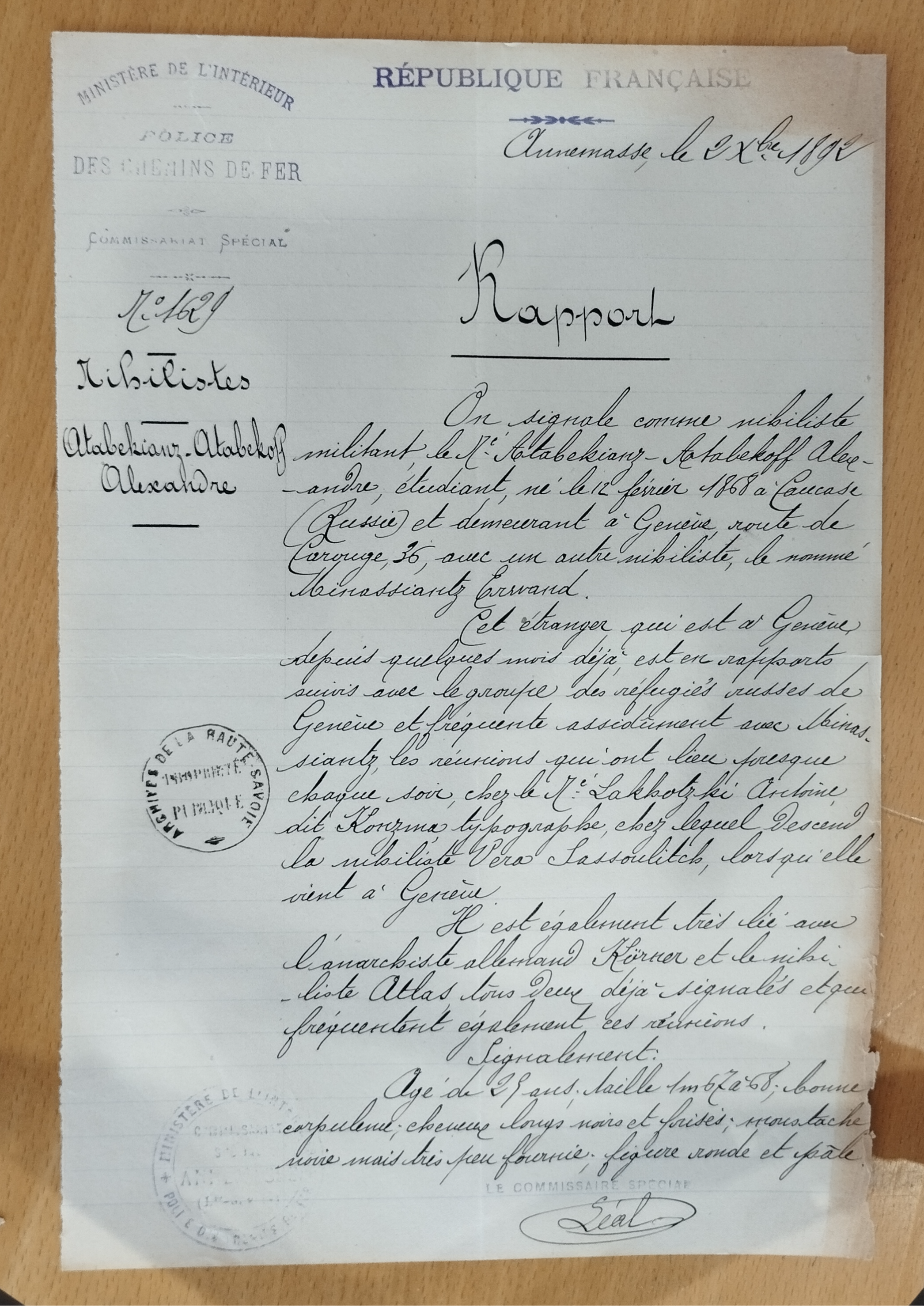
French police report on Alexander Atabekian's activities in Switzerland (1892)

After the outbreak of the Russian famine of 1891–1892, Atabekian initiated an effort to begin smuggling anarchist propaganda into the Russian Empire, intending to print texts in both the Russian and Armenian languages. Atabekian and Stoyanov travelled to London, where they visited Kropotkin. They informed him of their intentions to start delivering pamphlets to Ukraine and the Caucasus, where they had established connections with some individual anarchists. Atabekian then returned to Geneva and established a printing press in his own bedroom; he called it the Anarchist Library (Russian: Анархическая библиотека, romanized: Anarkhicheskaya Biblioteka), and it would become the first Russian anarchist propaganda circle since Zamfir Arbore's own in the 1870s.

He had planned to start by publishing a Russian language edition of Words of a Rebel, but Kropotkin was overwhelmed by work and unable to translate more than a few chapters, leaving the rest to Varlam Cherkezishvili. Atabekian also initially lacked the resources to publish a periodical, so decided to start out publishing individual pamphlets. His first publication was a Russian language edition of Mikhail Bakunin's The Paris Commune and the Idea of the State, which was followed in 1892 by Kropotkin's The Destruction of the State. In 1893, he published Kropotkin's Political Rights, Anarchism and Spirit of Revolt, as well as Reclus' To My Brother the Peasant, and Errico Malatesta's Between Peasants, the latter of which Atabekian wrote a preface directing it towards Armenians. After publishing the first batch of pamphlets, he considered selling his printing equipment to the Free Russian Press, but was dissuaded by Kropotkin, due to their ideological differences.

In 1894, he published Kropotkin's Revolutionary Minorities and Grave's Why We Are Revolutionaries. The first pages of these pamphlets included the words "Authorised by the Ministry of Education", printed in the Turkish language. These pamphlets were circulated widely among Armenian immigrant circles and later in Armenia itself, following Stoyanov's own distribution efforts. Despite their efforts, Atabekian was largely unsuccessful in smuggling the pamphlets into the Russian Empire, but their work was taken up only a few years later by another Russian anarchist group in Geneva. During this period, he also formed links with the nascent Armenian Revolutionary Federation (ARF) and helped to publish its newspaper Droshak, together with Stepan Zorian.

After graduating with his bachelor's degree, Atabekian moved to France in order to continue his medical studies. He moved first to Lyon, where he spent a few months working at a state-of-the-art clinic. During his time there, he witnessed the assassination of Sadi Carnot by Sante Caserio, as well as the subsequent anti-Italian reprisals, which turned him against the anarchist strategy of "motiveless terrorism". His publishing work slowed down at this time, but did not stop entirely, as he waited for further sheets of Words of a Rebel and began preparing to publish a magazine in the Armenian language. He then moved on to Paris, where he began publication of Hamaink (Armenian: Համայնք, lit. 'Community'), the first anarchist periodical in the Armenian language. It ran for five issues, each made up of eight pages, which contained articles about anarchism and the Armenian national movement. Atabekian thought that Armenia was ripe for revolution, due to the conditions created by the Ottoman Empire's despotism and the exploitation of Armenian labour in Europe and America. He called for the collectivisation of land and the establishment of self-governance in Armenia. Although he was staunchly opposed to Ottoman rule in Armenia, he also cautioned against an intervention in the region by the Entente powers. Atabekian also published articles by the ARF, but supplemented them with his own criticisms of the authoritarianism and centralisation he had experienced within the structures of Armenian political parties. While it focused largely on Armenia, the journal also gave attention to the revolutionary anarchist movements in France, Italy, Poland, Russia and Spain. Atabekian himself did not sign any of the articles he wrote, in order to protect himself from prosecution for his anarchist activities. Hamaink quickly gained popularity among the Armenian diaspora throughout Europe, with Stoyanov helping to distribute it in the Balkans, Caucasus and Turkey.

=== Move east ===
Atabekian ceased all of his publication activities after receiving news of the Hamidian massacres, which emotionally devastated him. As Armenian resistance to the anti-Armenian massacres in the Ottoman Empire manifested, he established connections with anarchist and libertarian socialist activists within the ARF. The anarchists of the ARF blended socialist anarchism with a form of Armenian nationalism, influenced in part by the Russian nihilist movement. Together with other Armenian libertarians, Atabekian wrote a declaration to the London Congress of the Second International; he argued that European powers were complicit in the Hamidian massacres and declared the beginning of a social revolution in West Asia.

In 1896, Atabekian graduated as a Doctor of Medicine. Prohibited from returning to the Russian Empire due to a sentence of exile for his anarchist activities, he moved first to Bulgaria, where he provided medical assistance to Armenians that had fled the Hamidian massacres. His correspondence from this time indicates that he then travelled through Istanbul and İzmir, where he attempted to promote anarchism among the local Armenian communities. By the turn of the 20th century, he had settled in Rasht, in the Gilan province of Iran. There he worked as a physician and published an Iranian edition of Hamaink, which received a Persian language translation. During this time, he also trained the young Ardeshir Ovanessian as a pharmacist, after which Ovanessian went on to become a leader of the Iranian Communist Party.

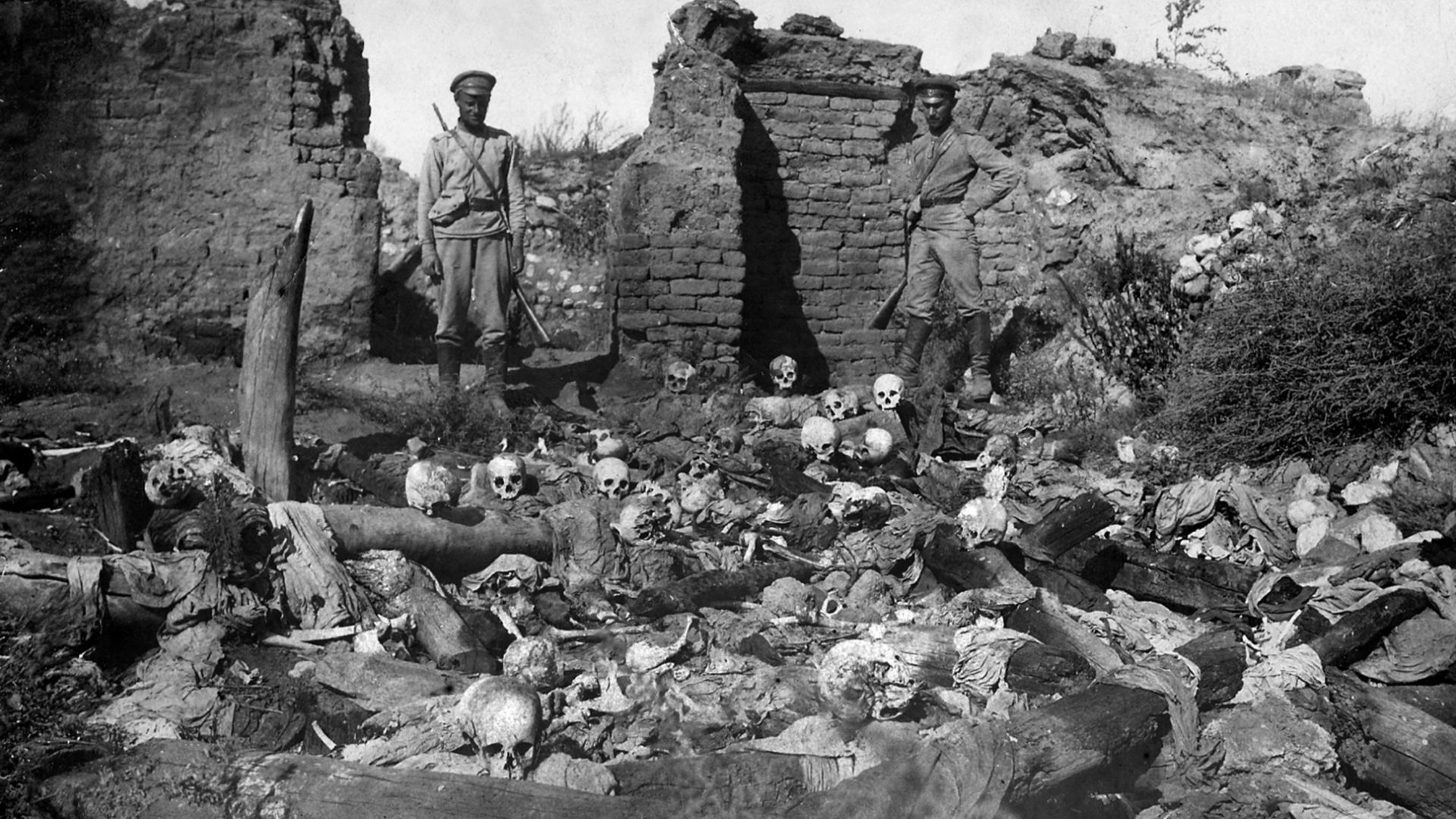
Soldiers of the Imperial Russian Army near Muş, where an anti-Armenian massacre had taken place

After the outbreak of World War I, Atabekian was granted permission to return to the Russian Empire, which was experiencing such a shortage of combat medics that it began ignoring their backgrounds. Atabekian was quickly appointed to head a field hospital in Baku, but he fell severely ill with typhoid fever and went on sick leave. He recovered by early 1915 and was appointed to head a military hospital in Kars province, where his wife Ekaterina was working on a residency. Here he treated not only wounded soldiers but also civilians, including refugees that had fled the Armenian genocide. He travelled constantly to different fields during this period, witnessing the aftermath of battles in Karakilisa, Khnus and Muş. By the end of 1916, his hospital had run out of medicine, and his requests to Moscow for resupply went unfulfilled, which led to most of the medical staff dispersing and the hospital effectively dissolving. Atabekian left the front line and returned to Rasht.

=== Revolution writings in Russia ===
In the wake of the February Revolution of 1917, Atabekian moved to Moscow, where he once again returned to political activism. After the subsequent October Revolution, he wrote a series of articles for Anarkhiia, calling for anarchists to lead a social revolution and criticising the Bolsheviks' seizure of power. He also published an open letter to Kropotkin, in which he sharply criticised the Imperial Russian Army's attacks against the local Armenian and Kurdish populations, comparing them to the German occupation of Belgium.

During this time, Atabekian began referring to himself as a "political atheist", as he believed any form of power was inevitably opposed to the will of the people. In his account of the events, Bloody Week in Moscow, Atabekian depicted the October Revolution as a utopian "revolution from above", one that was carried out against the will of the people, who were largely indifferent to the revolution, and which he predicted would inevitably fail as a result. He compared the Bolsheviks' actions with the Marxist conception of historical materialism, the latter of which argued that revolution could only occur when the material conditions were correct, and concluded that such conditions were missing from the October Revolution, as it was imposed from above rather than coming from the people themselves. He then called for anarchists to begin agitating for the construction of a new society through workers' self-management.

Atabekian placed his hopes in Moscow's "house committees", which had been established in order to protect the common interests of tenants and regulate landlords to ensure regular repairs and central heating. Atabekian believed that these committees could be the means by which to fulfill people's needs and build a new social order, without political parties. By the outbreak of the Russian Civil War, Atabekian began advocating for the creation of an independent anarchist army, established along decentralised and anti-authoritarian lines, which could defend people against the rising White movement. This call was notably taken up by Nestor Makhno, who formed a number of partisan detachments in villages throughout Ukraine.

On 12 April 1918, the Bolsheviks initiated a wave of political repression against the anarchist movement, forcibly dissolving the Moscow Federation of Anarchist Groups and shutting down Anarkhiia. Before long, Atabekian and Herman Sandomirskyi had established a new printing cooperative, from which they published their new periodical Pochin. Edited by Atabekian, who also carried out the typesetting himself, Pochin ran for 11 issues, publishing letters from Peter Kropotkin and Atabekian's own accounts from West Asia. In the journal, Atabekian developed on Kropotkin's theories of mutual aid and co-operative economics. Atabekian considered cooperation to be a "law of life", stemming from the evolution of eusociality and human society, and saw it as essential to establishing socialist anarchism. From an analysis of history, he concluded that the co-operative movement distinguished itself from capitalism and other economic forms like state socialism, not only because it was unmotivated by profit and sought to abolish wage labour, but also because it upheld a morality based on "freedom, equality and justice". He also defined the co-operative movement in opposition to the state, and believed that the abolition of the state would give way to a co-operative society based on mutual aid and voluntary labour. He thus declared co-operative movement to be in opposition to state socialism, which he decried as imperialistic and limited by its own borders, whereas co-operative movement was internationalist in its methods.

Atabekian repeatedly attempted to recruit Peter Kropotkin to write for Pochin, but he refused each time, as he was focused on writing what would be his final work, Ethics: Origin and Development. Atabekian nevertheless kept Kropotkin updated on the publication, receiving constructive criticism about an article that distinguished between territoriality and statehood, which Atabekian heavily revised before releasing. On 24 October 1920, Atabekian was arrested by the Cheka, on charges of anti-Soviet agitation. During his interrogation, he attempted to prove his dedication to the revolution and distinguished between the charge of being "anti-Soviet", which he denied, and that of being "anti-State", which he openly admitted to. He was initially sentenced to two years in a labour camp, but this was quickly commuted to six months. On 2 January 1921, Atabekian was prematurely released from prison, following a request for amnesty made by Peter Kropotkin to Vladimir Bonch-Bruyevich. Atabekian then tried to appeal for the lifting of the ban on Pochin, eventually receiving permission from Lev Kamenev to resume publication.

=== Treatment and death of Kropotkin ===
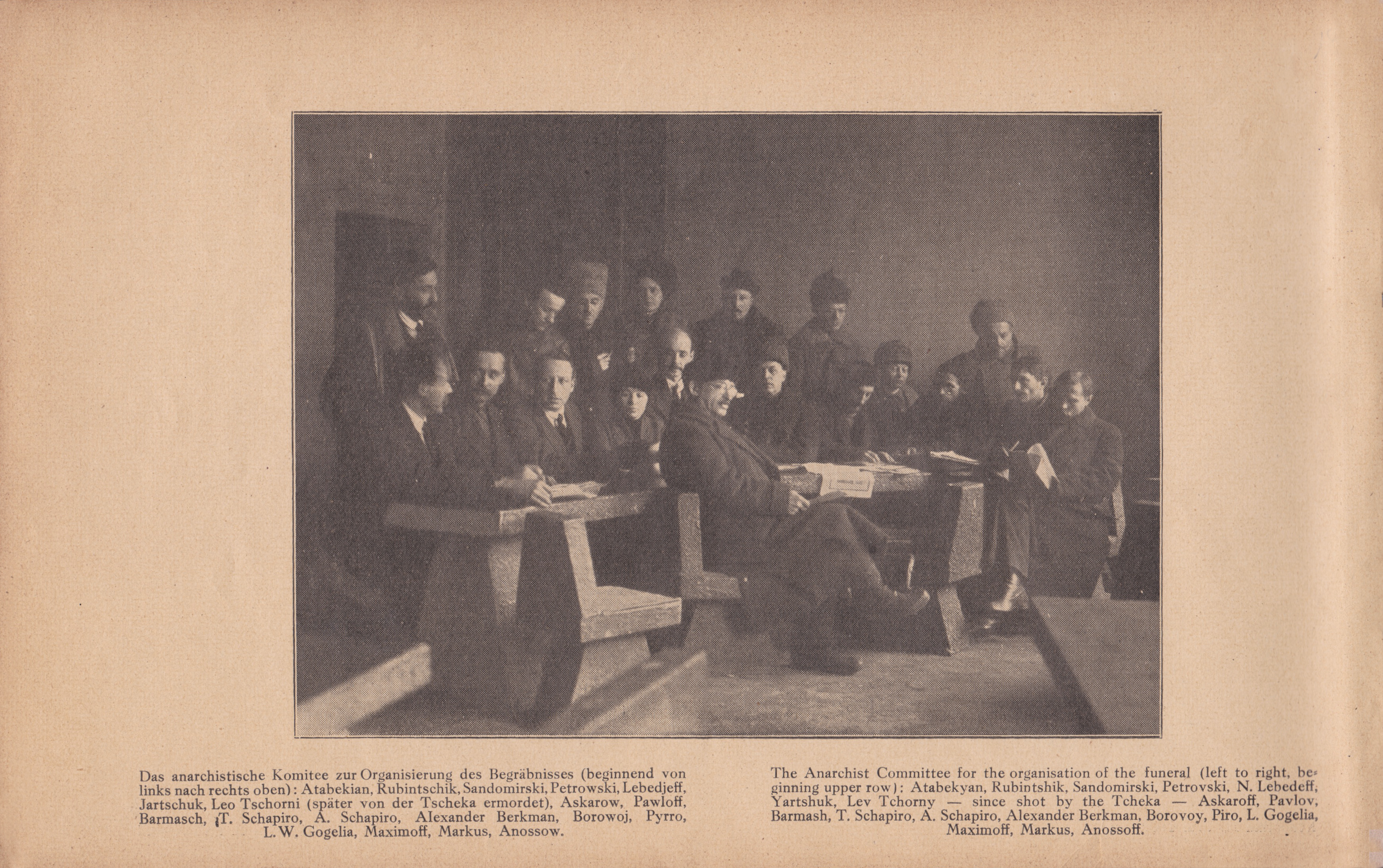
Atabekian (top left) alongside other figures of the anarchist movement organizing Kropotkin's funeral, such as Alexander Berkman and Lev Chernyi (collections of L'Éphéméride anarchiste).

By 1921, Kropotkin had retired to Dmitrov, a small town outside the Russian capital, where Atabekian visited him regularly. During this period, Atabekian had returned to his practice as a physician, and the two frequently exchanged friendly correspondence. After a meeting with the Bolshevik leader Vladimir Lenin, Kropotkin informed Atabekian that he had requested an amnesty for one of his friends that had been taken hostage by the Cheka. Kropotkin expressed regret over making his visit, but when he asked Atabekian if he disapproved, his friend responded that he would "approve of pleading even to the Tsar to save those who were condemned to death." Kropotkin went on to say that he had asked Lenin to put a stop to the Red Terror, fearing a repeat of the Reign of Terror during the French Revolution, which he thought had frightened Lenin enough to reign in the executions. Kropotkin also told Atabekian that he worried the Bolsheviks might "bury the revolution".

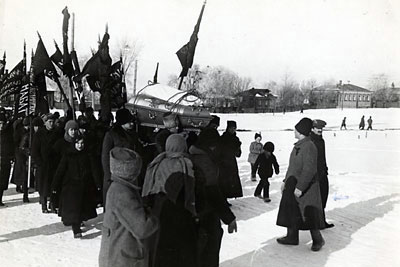
Peter Kropotkin's funeral in Moscow

When Kropotkin fell ill with pneumonia, Atabekian travelled to Dmitrov to provide him with medical care. Atabekian was joined by five other physicians, including Dmitry Pletnyov, who had been dispatched to treat Kropotkin by Lenin himself. Despite the severe case, his doctors concluded that he could still recover from his ailments; Kropotkin himself expressed that he didn't want to die, as he still had work to do. As his condition got worse, and Kropotkin began to accept that he was dying, he expressed regret that he had "give[n] trouble to so many good people." He continued to talk with his friends until his last moments, once remarking to them, "what a hard business—dying".

Kropotkin died on 8 February 1921, with his family and Atabekian by his side. Emma Goldman and Alexander Berkman arrived the following day, to belatedly pay their respects. The Bolshevik government offered to give Kropotkin a state funeral, but his family declined, instead forming a committee to arrange his funeral. Atabekian was among the co-organisers of the funeral. Kropotkin's family and friends were given permission to use his ancestral home in Moscow, which they turned into a museum for his life and work. Atabekian served on the museum's committee, together with Nikolai Lebedev and Aleksei Solonovich.

=== Later work and death ===
On 29 August 1921, the Cheka arrested Atabekian again, on the same charges as his previous arrest, but the intervention of Lev Kamenev led to his release the following month. The Soviet authorities again briefly lifted the ban on the publication of Pochin, but it was banned again in 1922 and Atabekian's printing equipment was confiscated, bringing an end to his publishing career. In the final volume of Pochin, he published a letter from Kropotkin, dated to late 1918. Without his publishing work, he attempted to earn a living doing various odd jobs, eventually returning to work as a physician. Atabekian was also permitted by the authorities to continue his work with the Kropotkin Museum Committee throughout most of the period of the New Economic Policy (NEP). In 1927, Atabekian and other anarchists organised a demonstration against the execution of Sacco and Vanzetti, with the permission of the Moscow Soviet.

By this time, the Kropotkin Museum Committee had collapsed into factional infighting, which was beginning to affect the entire Russian anarchist movement. Atabekian, who saw the committee as an organ of anarchist agitation, clashed with Kropotkin's widow Sofia, who wanted to avoid any conflict with the authorities. Atabekian and other anarchists were ultimately expelled from the committee, but even this did not save the Museum from its eventual closure. Following Joseph Stalin's rise to power and the beginning of totalitarianism in the Soviet Union, the anarchist movement was severely repressed. Before long, all the last members of the Kropotkin Museum Committee had been arrested, deported or killed; and the museum itself was closed by the Soviet authorities.

In 1930, Atabekian suffered a stroke, which forced him into retirement. He spent the last years of his life in his flat in Moscow, where he lived with his son, before dying on 5 December 1933. But sources have disagreed on the exact details of his death, with some saying he died in a forced labour camp or disappeared into exile. In 1951, the Russian anarchist magazine Delo truda published memoirs from I. Zhemchuzhnikov, a doctor who worked in the Gulag. He reported that in 1940, while working in a lagpunkt in Temnikov, he had treated an old anarchist called Alexei or Alexander Atabekian, who died of a heart attack towards the end of that year. This version was later taken up by reference literature, including the International Institute of Social History and the International Encyclopedia of Revolution and Protest. American historian Paul Avrich also reported that he was among those arrested and imprisoned in the Gulag, and that he died either in prison or in exile within a few years of 1929.

== Legacy ==
Although Marxism-Leninism came to supplant Atabekian's anarchism in Armenia, anarchist ideas gained traction within the Armenian diaspora, inspiring the publication of Armenian-language anarchist journals in the United States. Today Atabekian is considered one of the foremost thinkers of post-classical anarchism in the former Russian Empire. His analysis of the October Revolution was taken up by later generations of anarchists in the 20th and 21st centuries. In an April 1924 issue of the Argentine anarchist newspaper La Antorcha, Atabekian's writings were quoted by Ukrainian Jewish anarchist Anatolii Horelik, who warned against disregarding ethical considerations in revolutionary methods.

In the 21st century, he has been cited as a seminal example of a first-wave anarchist thinker from outside the Western tradition. Atabekian's advocacy of house committees has also been taken up by the Ukrainian urbanists Olena Zaika and Oleh Masiuk, who cited his work as foundational to research on the reorganisation of urban space.

Although Atabekian left quite a large archive of his work, it was destroyed by a bomb that fell on his family's house during the Battle of Moscow. Information about Atabekian is also scarce in the Russian state archives, which has resulted in some difficulty in forming a complete biographical picture of his life. Some of Atabekian's papers have been preserved and archived by the International Institute of Social History, which collected his letters from Peter Kropotkin into the world's largest archive of Kropotkin's works.

== Selected works ==
Thesis

- "De la pathogénie de l'angine de poitrine" / "On the Pathogenesis of Angina Pectoris" (1896, ed. Henri Stapelmohr)

Letters

- "To the Armenian Villagers" (1890)
- "Letter to Armenian Revolutionaries from an International Anarchist Organization" (1890)
- "To the Revolutionary and Libertarian Socialists" (1896)
- "Открытое письмо П. А. Кропоткину" / "Open Letter to P. A. Kropotkin" (1917, Anarkhiia no. 7)

Pamphlets

- "Кровавая неделя в Москве" / "The Bloody Week in Moscow" (1917)
- "Возможна ли анархическая социальная революция" / "Is Anarchist Social Revolution Possible?" (1918, Pochin)
- "Основы земской финансовой организации без власти и принуждения" / "Fundamentals of Zemstvo Financial Organisation Without Power and Coercion" (1918)
- "Перелом в анархистском учении" / "A Break in Anarchist Doctrine" (1918, Pochin)
- "Социальные задачи домовых комитетов" / "Social Tasks of the House Committees" (1918, Pochin)
- "Дух погромный" / "The Pogrom Spirit" (1919, Pochin)
- "Кооперация и анархизм" / "Cooperation and Anarchism" (1919, Pochin)

Articles

- Կառավարության կոչումը / "The Call of the Government" (1894, Hamaink no. 1)
- "Յեղափոխական կազմակերպութիւն" / "Revolutionary Organization" (1894, Hamaink no. 3)
- "Проблема свободной армии" / "The Problem of a Free Army" (1918, Anarkhiia no. 83)
- "Контр-революция разгуливает" / "Counter-Revolution Goes Wild" (1918, Anarkhiia no. 90)
- "Коммунизм и Кооперация" / "Communism and Cooperation" (1920, Pochin no. 3)
- "Территориальность и анархизм" / "Territoriality and Anarchism" (1920, Pochin no. 11)
- "Из воспоминаний о П.А. Кропоткине" / "In Memory of P.A. Kropotkin" (1922, Pochin no. 6–7)

Collections

- Против власти: сборник статей / Against Power: a collection of articles (2013, Librocom; ISBN 9785397031660; OCLC 840427393)

== Bibliography ==
- Adams, Jason (2003). "Middle Eastern Anarchism: Armenia, Lebanon, Turkey, Palestine". Non-Western Anarchisms: Rethinking the Global Context (PDF). Johannesburg: Zabalaza. pp. 23–24. OCLC 1048122318.
- Avrich, Paul (1971) [1967]. The Russian Anarchists. Princeton: Princeton University Press. ISBN 0-691-00766-7. OCLC 1154930946.
- Biryukova, Andreya M.; Krivensky, V.V. (1993). "Атабекян Александр Моисеевич" [Atabekian Alexander Moiseevich]. In Volubchev, Pavel V. (ed.). Политические деятели России, 1917: биографический словарь [Political figures of Russia, 1917: Biographical dictionary] (in Russian). Moscow: Great Russian Encyclopedia. pp. 26–27. ISBN 9785852701374. OCLC 29600430.
- Biryukova, Andreya, ed. (2013). "Предисловие" [Preface]. Против власти: сборник статей [Against Power: a collection of articles] (in Russian). Moscow: Librocom. pp. 4–14. ISBN 978-5-397-03166-0. OCLC 840427393.
- Edwards-Schuth, Brandon David (2023). Radical Praxis Pedagogies: A Critical Podcast Methodology (PhD). Washington State University. OCLC 1413730574. ProQuest 2838173312.
- Evren, Süreyyya (2007). "Twenty Years of the Black Flag in Turkey". Fifth Estate. No. 374. ISSN 0015-0800.
- Gooderham, P. (1981). The Anarchist Movement in Russia, 1905–1917 (PDF) (PhD). University of Bristol.
- Heath, Nick (2009). "Anarchism, Russia". In Ness, Immanuel (ed.). The International Encyclopedia of Revolution and Protest: 1500 to the Present. Vol. 1. Malden, MA: Wiley-Blackwell. pp. 141–143. doi:10.1002/9781405198073.wbierp0071. ISBN 9781405198073.
- Johnson, Eric M. (2015). "Demographics, Inequality and Entitlements in the Russian Famine of 1891". The Slavonic and East European Review. 93 (1): 96–119. doi:10.5699/slaveasteurorev2.93.1.0096. ISSN 0037-6795. JSTOR 10.5699/slaveasteurorev2.93.1.0096.
- Melis, Rachel (2010). "Anarchism, Iran". In Ness, Immanuel (ed.). The International Encyclopedia of Revolution and Protest: 1500 to the Present. Malden, MA: Wiley-Blackwell. pp. 1–2. doi:10.1002/9781405198073.wbierp1660. ISBN 9781405198073.
- Mitchell, Ryan Robert (2010). "Anarchism, Armenia". In Ness, Immanuel (ed.). The International Encyclopedia of Revolution and Protest: 1500 to the Present. Malden, MA: Wiley-Blackwell. pp. 1–2. doi:10.1002/9781405198073.wbierp1657. ISBN 9781405198073.
- Moisseva, K. D.; Ivanov, A. A. (2023). "РОССИЙСКИЙ АНАРХИЗМ И КООПЕРАТИВНОЕ ДВИЖЕНИЕ" [Russian Anarchism and the Co-operative Movement]. In Zolotarevoy, E. A. (ed.). Всероссийские молодежные научные чтения им. профессора НН Про-топопова: сборник материалов (PDF) (in Russian). Vol. 2. Novosibirsk: ANOO VO Centrosoyuz RF "SibUPK". pp. 389–391. ISBN 978-5-334-00293-7.
- Piir, Aleksandra (2012). "(Само)управление в петроградских/ленинградских жилых домах. 1. Домовые комитеты (1917–1921)". Antropologicheskiĭ forum (in Russian) (17): 175–218. ISSN 1815-8870. OCLC 760090349.
- Pittaluga, Roberto (2017). "Entre el exilio y la revolución: Komin-Alexandrovsky, Anatol Gorelik y Mijail Yaroshevsky" [Between the exile and the revolution: Komin-Alexandrovsky, Anatol Gorelik and Mikhail Yaroshevsky]. Claves. Revista de Historia (in Spanish). 3 (5): 7–36. doi:10.25032/crh.v3i5.154 (inactive 22 January 2026). ISSN 2393-6584.
- Rakhmaninova, Maria (2017). "КРИТИКА РЕВОЛЮЦИИ СЛЕВА: АНАРХИСТСКАЯ ОПТИКА" (PDF). Acta Eruditorium (in Russian) (24). Saint Petersburg: Russian Christian Humanitarian Academy: 20–22.
- Rakhmaninova, Maria (2020). Власть и тело [Power and the Body] (PDF) (in Russian) (2nd ed.). Moscow: Radical Theory and Practice. ISBN 978-5-6041337-8-1.
- Ryabov, Petr (2009). "Философия постклассического российского анархизма - Terra incognita для историко-философских исследований (к постановке проблемы)" [Philosophy of post-classical Russian anarchism – Terra incognita for historical and philosophical research (to state the problem)]. Преподаватель (in Russian). ХХI (3): 289–297. ISSN 2073-9613. OCLC 1404732200.
- Khudinyan, Gevorg Sargsi (2006). Հ Յ ԴԱՇՆԱԿՑՈՒԹՅԱՆ ՔՆՆԱԿԱՆ ՊԱՏՄՈՒԹՅՈՒՆ [Historical Examination of the Armenian Revolutionary Federation] (PDF) (in Armenian). Armenian Revolutionary Federation. p. 344.
- Selbuz, Cemal (July 2006). "Biography of Armenian anarchist Alexander Atabekian". Abolishing the Borders from Below. No. 25. Translated by Keskin, Deniz. OCLC 65399183 – via Anarkismo.net.
- Shub, David (1953). "Kropotkin and Lenin". The Russian Review. 12 (4): 227–234. doi:10.2307/125955. JSTOR 125955.
- Slatter, John (1994). "The Correspondence of P. A. Kropotkin as Historical Source Material". The Slavonic and East European Review. 72 (2): 277–288. ISSN 0037-6795. JSTOR 4211477.
- Ter Minassian, Anahide (1994). "The Role of the Armenian Community in the Foundation and Development of the Socialist Movement in the Ottoman Empire and Turkey: 1876–1923". In Tunçay, Meter; Zürcher, Erik Jan (eds.). Socialism and Nationalism in the Ottoman Empire, 1876–1923. London: I.B. Tauris. pp. 109–156. ISBN 1-85043-787-4. LCCN 93-61265. OCLC 848668227.
- Woodcock, George; Avakumović, Ivan (1990). Peter Kropotkin: From Prince to Rebel. Montreal: Black Rose Books. ISBN 0-921689-60-8. OCLC 21156316.
- Zaika, Olena; Masiuk, Oleh (2020). "Managing a Condominium as a Creative Urban Space in Ukraine". Proceedings of the 2nd International Scientific Conference (PDF). Ljubljana: School of Economics and Business. pp. 369–375. ISSN 2712-2522.
