= Homenmen =

Badge of Homenmen

Homenmen (Armenian: Հայ Մարմնամարզական Միութիւն (Հ.Մ.Մ.) English: Armenian Sports Union) is a pan-Armenian sports and Scouting organization established in 1921 in Aleppo, Syria. Its sports include football, basketball, table tennis, cycling, athletics, and many others.

It has wide presence in the Armenian diaspora. Homenmen has established chapters in the Middle East (Lebanon, Syria, Kuwait), Europe (London, Paris), Australia, North and South Americas and more recently a presence in Armenia.

Although not officially admitted, it is considered to be affiliated with the Social Democrat Hunchakian Party and the party's sports and scouting wing. Its emblem, taken from the Social Democrat Hunchakian Party newspaper Hunchak, meaning "bell" in English, is taken by members to represent "awakening, enlightenment, and freedom."

== Homenmen Beirut ==
Homenmen Beirut is the Lebanese branch of the Armenian multi sports club with activities in mainly in football, table tennis, cycling as well as a scouting program. Homenmen Beirut is one of Lebanon's pioneering sports organizations and was founded in 1921. It has branches all over the country. The main branch is the one of Beirut. The football team has won championship titles in the Lebanese Football League.

== Homenmen Syria ==
Homenmen scouts in Damascus, Syria

Homenmen - Damascus, Syria- is still active to this day regardless the tough situations in Syria's capital city Damascus. The football team was active until 2014. The Dance group "Meghri Dance Group" is still active to this day.

== Homenmen Montreal ==
Homenmen Montreal is a sports and community organization based in Montreal, Canada, affiliated with the global Homenemen network.

Building on that heritage, Homenmen Montreal carries the same mission within the Armenian-Canadian community. The branch emphasizes sportsmanship, cultural pride, and youth engagement. In recent years, the chapter has established its own football team, marking a revival of Homenmen's long-standing sporting tradition in a new setting. The team competes in local Laval leagues (TotalCampo), showcasing both Armenian identity and community spirit.

Through its Instagram account, @homenmen.montreal, the organization shares updates on:

- Football matches and tournaments
- Training sessions and team news
