= Cəhri =

- Municipality
- Location within Azerbaijan
- Coordinates: 39°20′51″N 45°24′50″E
- Country: Azerbaijan
- Autonomous republic: Nakhchivan
- District: Babek

Population (2005)
  - Total: 8,454
- Time zone: UTC+4 (AZT)

Cəhri (Armenian: Ճահուկ, also, Jahri, Jagry, Dzhagry, and Dzhakhri) is a village and municipality in the Babek District of Nakhchivan, Azerbaijan. It is located 23 km in the north from the district center, on the bank of the Jahrichay River, on the foothill area. Its population is busy with grain growing, vegetable-growing and animal husbandry. There are two secondary schools, two kindergartens, five libraries, three mosques, a children's music school, a club and a hospital in the village. It has a population of 8,454. The settlement of the İşıqlar of the Middle Ages has been recorded in north-east of the village of Jahri.

== History ==
The area was inhabited since early centuries, the settlements where located in the territory of the village. The remaining ruins of the settlements of the Ishyqlar, Kandtapa, Uzuntapa, Goshatapa, Garajalar, Ayriarch show the ancient history of the village of the Jahri. During the reign of the Arshakuni dynasty, Jahuk was the central settlement of the 14th province of Syunik province of Greater Armenia. Later, Jahuk came under the rule of Orbelian princes. After the Orbelians, it passed to the Proshyan princes.

According to legend, because of the foreign attacks in the Middle Ages, the settlement of the İşıqlar (Ishyqlar) has been destroyed; a part of its population settled in the Jahri village, and the rest of them moved to the Sisian region of Armenia and built the same named settlement (İşıqlar). There are ancient quarters of the Jilovkhanly and the Salahly at the present Jahri. In the cemetery, located in the east side of the village, there are statues of the stone ram of the medieval ages. The population living in this area since ancient times belong to the Yurdchu tribe, one of the arms of the Turkic Kangars (Kengerli) tribe. There has been the settlement of city-sized in the territory of Jahri village. In the book Jahrichay Valley of the Haji Qadir Gadirzadeh the Corresponding Member of Azerbaijan National Academy of Sciences has interesting information on Jahri. From the research of scientists it is known that the Jahri and Jahrichay valley are one of the oldest settlements in the Nakhchivan region. Here was one of the places where people had a sedentary lifestyle, it was a place of ancient craftsmanship and trade, where great caravan routes passed. In this strategical important region great defense castles were built, and castle cities existed. In the ancient city of Jahri, the art of well-sinking has ancient history. In the past, Jahri was developed considerably in terms of craftsmanship. The Qash shrine of Jahri is especially famous. Known as sanctuary an Esfandiar Zawiya (shrine) in the sources and among the people, it is located in the west of the Jahry village, in the slope of the mountain range named Qaş. This Sufi center, located in the mountainous area, about 2 kilometers in the west side from the Jahri village, is known since the Middle Ages.

== Demographics ==
According to the "Code of Statistical Data on the Population of the Transcaucasian Territory" for 1893, the village counted 1101 Christian Armenians and 2018 Muslim Tatars.

== Historical and archaeological monuments ==
=== İşıqlar ===
İşıqlar - the medieval settlement in the north-east of the Jahri village of Babek rayon. It is located in a favorable position in natural aspect. Its area is 46000 m2. The thickness of the cultural layer formed as result of the natural erosion is 3–5 meters. A large part of the place of residence (approximately 16,000 m2) is covered with piles of ashes; inside it are found fragments of clay pots that seem it is associated with the activity of pottery. The found materials are divided into two period; the fragments of the burned clay pot in the gray, black, pink colored belong to the early Middle Ages, and mainly, the burned potteries in the pink colored decorated with geometric and floral ornaments to the advanced stage of the Middle Ages. The necropolis of the Muslim graves of the settlement has been in the south, on a small hill. Most of the graves are destroyed. In the center of the area, there is a spring called "Khartakli spring". The traces of ancient irrigation system which were used until today still remain.

=== Kəndtəpə ===
Kəndtəpə - the medieval settlement in the west from the Jahri village of Babek rayon. Its area is more than 10 hectares. The rest of the archaeological monument lays towards to the north-west in the form of a hill. There was water line built with clay pipes in the area. There is the soil mound (ancient artificial hill) in the north from the settlement. Significant archaeological material, especially the rich ceramic products, were collected from the area.

=== Armenian churches ===
There were three Armenian churches in the village. St. Shoghakat Monastery of Jahuk was built in 1325-1330. It was located in the central district of the village. It was completely destroyed in 1982. Surb Astvatsatsin Church was built in the 13th century. As of the 1990s, it has been demolished. St. Hovhannes Church has frescoes dating back to the XVIII-XIX centuries. The church was renovated in the Middle ages. St. Hovhannes Church was destroyed at some point between 1997 and 2009.

== Notable people ==
- Stepan Sapah-Gulian - Armenian journalist, political scientist, intellectual and a leader of the Social Democrat Hunchakian Party
- Jean Althen (Hovhannès Althounian) -Armenian agronomist who developed the cultivation of madder in France
- Gaik Ovakimian - Major General, USSR
- Lazar I of Armenia - Catholicos of the Armenian Apostolic Church between 1737 and 1751
- Rosy Armen - French-Armenian singer

== See also ==
St. Hovhannes Church (Jahri)
