= Yeghia Jerejian =

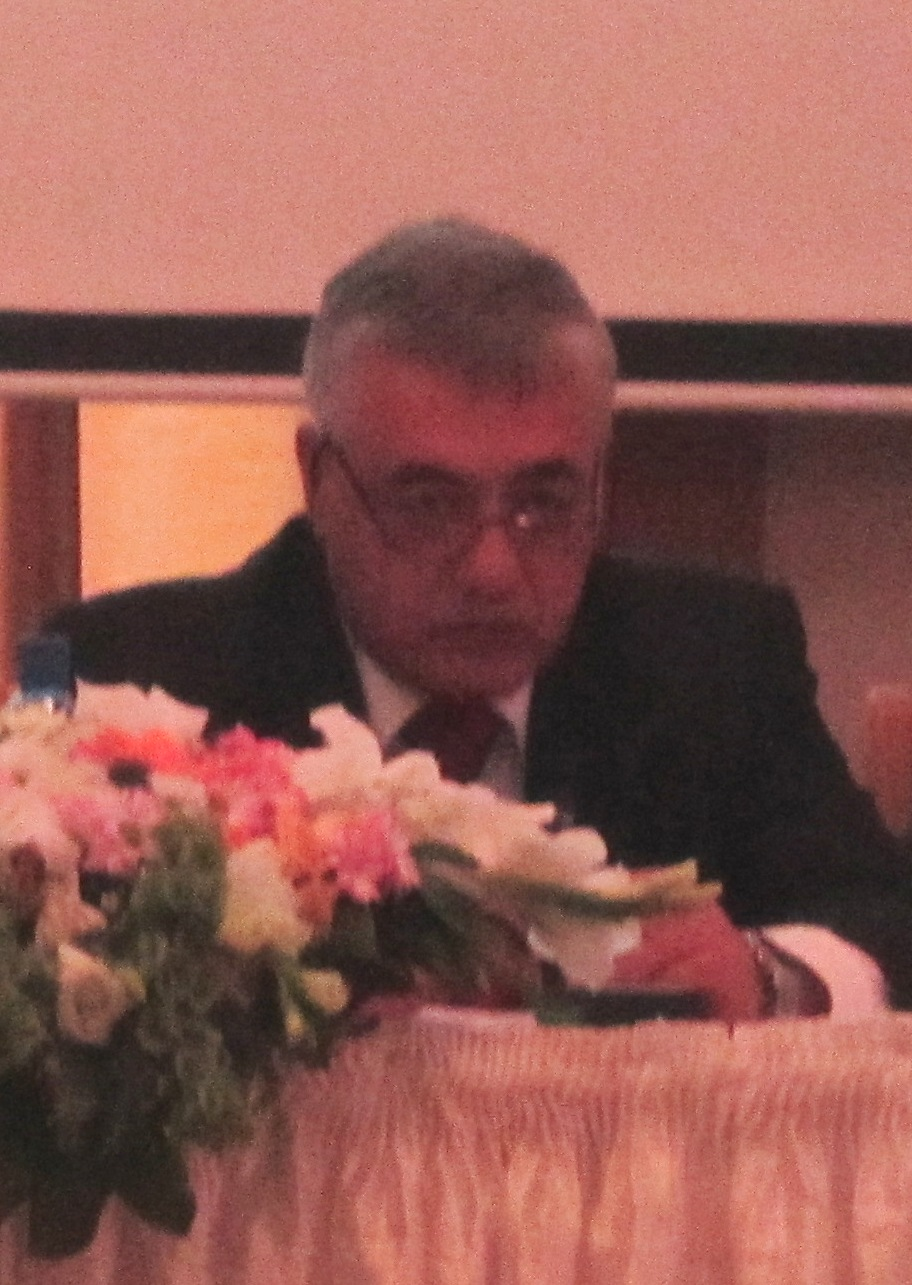
Yeghig Jerejian in 2016

Yeghia (Yeghig) Jerejian (Armenian: Տոքթ. Եղիկ Ճէրէճեան, born in 1957, in Beiruth) is a Lebanese-Armenian author and political figure, Social Democrat Hunchakian Party Central Committee Member (since 1995). From 1992 to 2009 (for four times) he was elected as a member of the Lebanese parliament from Beirut.

== Biography ==
Dr. Jerejian was born in Beirut, in a family which comes from Hadjin. A graduate of Beirut Hovagimian-Manoogian Armenian School, later graduated Yerevan State Medical University. He is a member of Ararad Daily editorial staff, a former editor of "Ararad Youth", and an author of 12 books and many articles on Armenian and Middle East history.

In 2014 in Beirut he published his sixth book entitled, “From the Ones Who Built the Road to Eternity.” In 1995 he published a monograph on the Armenian genocide in Arabic.

He is married to Houry Jerejian.

== Books ==
- Martyrs on Bloody Path, by Dr Yeghia Jerejian, Beirut, 1989
- Panturanism, 1998
- Pandukht, 1999
- The Ottoman Parliamentary Elections of 1912 and the Western Armenians, 2007
- From the Ones Who Built the Road to Eternity, 2014
- Medzn Mourat, 2016, 248 pages, ISBN 978-9939-860-22-0
