= Süleymanlı =

Süleymanlı Zeytun / Զէյթուն
- Neighbourhood
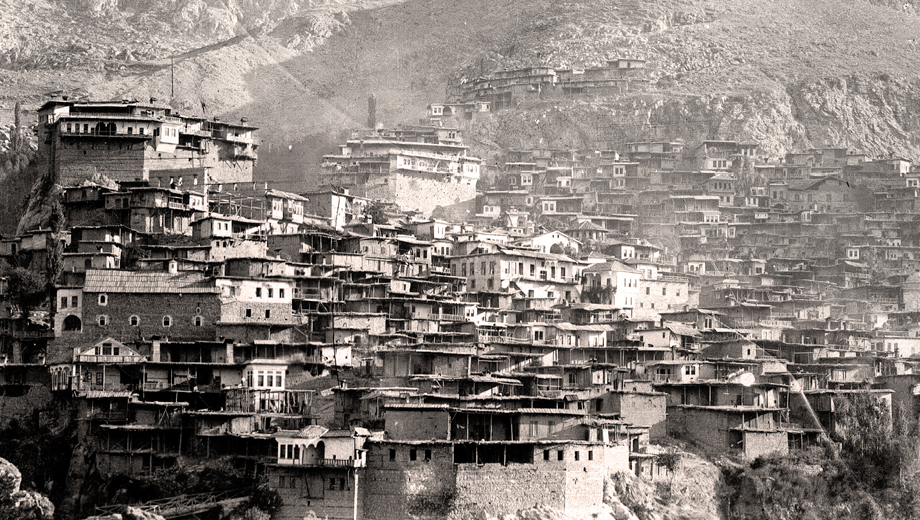
- Zeytun in 1915

- Location within Turkey
- Coordinates: 37°52′34″N 36°49′59″E
- Country: Turkey
- Province: Kahramanmaraş
- District: Onikişubat
- Population (2022): 475
- Time zone: UTC+3 (TRT)

Süleymanlı, historically Zeitoun (Armenian: Զէյթուն), Zeytoun, Zeytunfimis or Zeytünfimis, is a neighbourhood of the municipality and district of Onikişubat, Kahramanmaraş Province, Turkey. Its population is 475 (2022).

The village has an ancient history as a center of settlement. It was established on the Zeytun Stream in a narrow valley between the Ceyhan River and the Göksun Stream in the west of Maraş, between the high mountains and 69 km (43 mi) north of the center of Kahramanmaraş. The surface of the region has a very indented and protruding surface as it is cut by many streams with abundant water and strong flow. For this reason, the houses have an irregular appearance of leaning on steep slopes.

== Name and etymology ==
The name Zeitun comes from the Arabic word for olive. Another name for the town and the surrounding district used by Armenians is Ulnia. After the Turkish government had already changed the town's name to Yeni Şehir (lit. 'New City'), the town was renamed Süleymanlı on 8 June 1915 after the Turkish military commander Süleyman Bey who was killed fighting Armenian resistance against the Armenian Genocide in the town in 1915.

== History ==
=== Medieval period ===
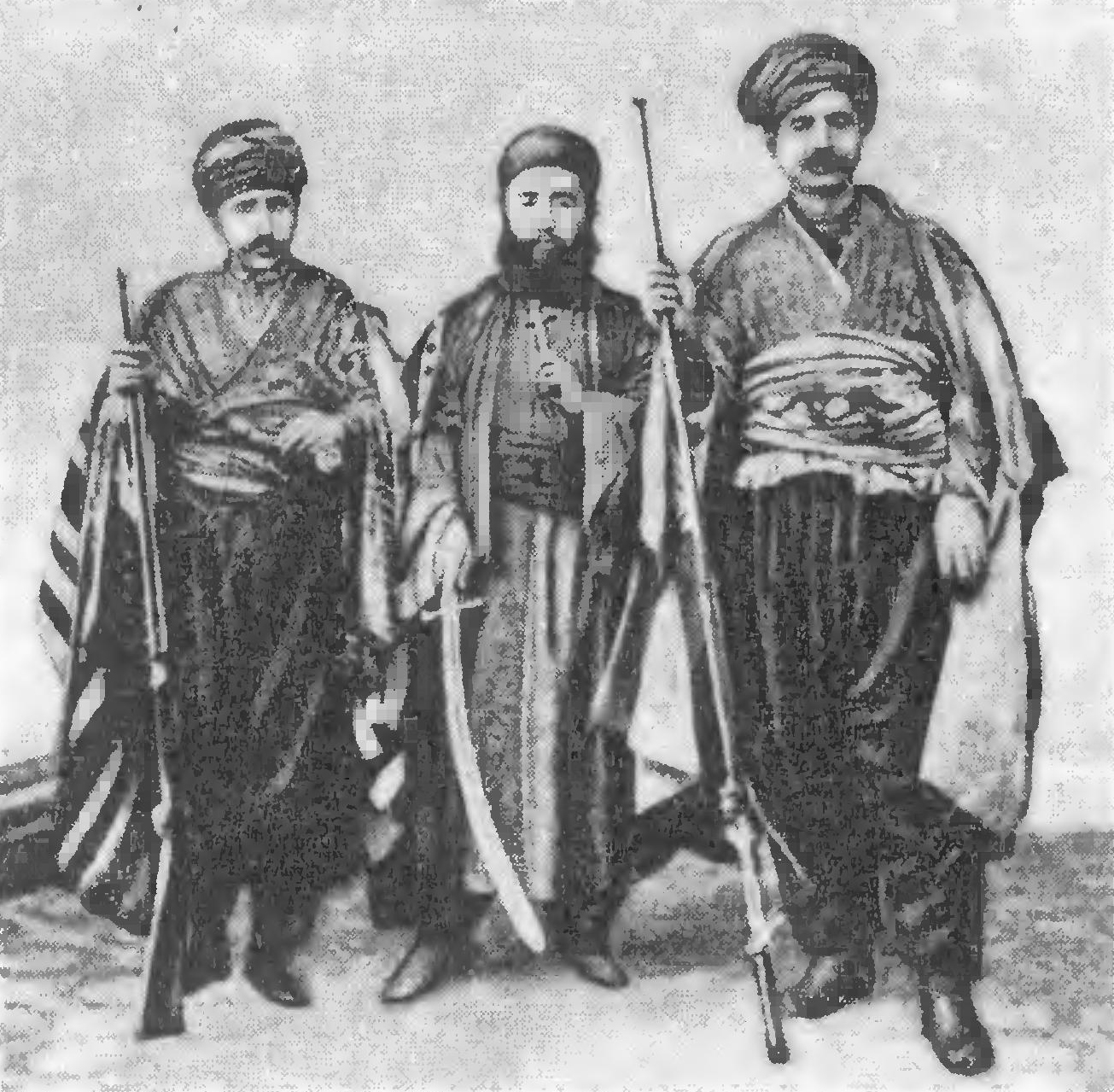
Armenian Zeytun natives

The monastery of Bārid, a major Syriac Orthodox monastery, was built close to the village in 969 and existed until around 1213. According to folk tradition, Armenians first came to Zeitun from the medieval Armenian capital of Ani after its fall in 1064. In the twelfth century the region was primarily settled by Armenians and belonged for some time to the Armenian Kingdom of Cilicia, with a Roupenid fortress named Inkuzut first mentioned in 1199.

=== Early Modern period ===
The Armenians of Zeytun and the surrounding district historically enjoyed a high degree of autonomy owing to their defensible position in the mountains. This autonomy was acknowledged by an edict of the Ottoman Sultan Murad IV made in 1618, which gave the inhabitants a high degree of autonomy in exchange for a yearly tax. In the 19th century, Zeitun was one of the few places where a ruling Armenian nobility still existed, consisting of four ishkhans (barons or princes) ruling the town and the surrounding villages. According to one contemporary Armenian source, the town consisted of 1,500 homes inhabited by Armenians in 1900, while 24 Turkish families had lived in the town before leaving in 1896.

The inhabitants fought with Ottoman forces multiple times from 1780 to 1895 to preserve their autonomy. The most notable rebellions in the town occurred in 1862, 1895 and 1915. Although Ottoman forces were unable to capture the town during the 1862 rebellion, the residents of Zeitun were unable to preserve their traditional autonomy after the 1860s. The rebellion of 1895 was incited by revolutionaries of the Social Democrat Hunchakian Party, and was ended by the mediation of the European powers after four months of fighting. The 1915 rebellion, also led by the Hunchaks, occurred during the Armenian genocide. The town was captured and its inhabitants were deported to Syria.

Some Armenians returned to Zeitun during the occupation of Cilicia by the French army from 1918 to 1921. However, when the region was ceded back to Turkey, the Armenians were forced to flee once again.

Historical population
Year	Pop.	±% p.a.
1985	1,444	—
1990	1,399	−0.63%
1997	437	−15.31%
2007	771	+5.84%
2012	689	−2.22%
2017	552	−4.34%
2022	475	−2.96%
Source: 1985 census, 1990 census, 1997 census and TÜIK (2007-2022)

== Notable natives ==
- Smpad Piurad, Armenian intellectual, writer, and public activist

== See also ==
- First Zeitun Resistance
- Zeitun Rebellion (1895–1896)
- Zeitun Resistance (1915)
