= Sarkis Dkhrouni =

Armenian politician (1898–1929)

Sarkis Dkhrouni (Տխրունի)
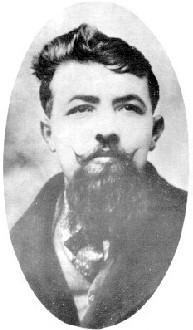

Personal details
- Born: 1898; Sis, Turkey
- Died: 17 January 1929 (aged 30–31); Beirut, Lebanon.

Military service
- Allegiance: Social Democrat Hunchakian Party

Sarkis Dkhrouni (Տխրունի, meaning Sad, Sarkis Kederian, Սարգիս Քէտէրեան) was an Armenian political figure and editor. Armenian Dkhrouhi Youth Association is named after him.

== Biography ==
Dkhruni was born in Sis in 1898. He studied at National college of Sis, then in 1912 he entered Ayntab college. His father was killed during the Armenian genocide, Dkhrouni and his mother survived and returned to Cilicia. He worked as teacher and edited "Tavros" and "Nor Serund" newspapers. After the occupation of Hadjin he moved to Syria, where he edited "Souriakan Mamoul" newspaper. Working as a Social Democrat Hunchakian Party activist, he was arrested by the French authorities and sent to Arwat island where he published "New Bastille" paper with other Arabian patriots. He was released in 1928 and moved to Beirut, where worked as a teacher of camp's Sahagian college. He was killed in Beirut on 17 January 1929 by his political opponents.

Many papers, including 13 local (non-Armenian) ones, reported the news of Dkhrouni's assassination. Lebanese reporter Shoukri Sadi wrote, "It would be hard for me to see another funeral procession like this, which I unfortunately became a witness to. Twenty thousand Armenians, on their shoulders carrying the coffin of a great Armenian activist". His monument is erected at the Armenian national cemetery of Beirut.
