= St. Hovhannes Church (Jahri) =

Armenian church in the Nakhchivan Autonomous Republic of Azerbaijan

St. Hovhannes Church of Chahuk
- Սուրբ Հովհաննես եկեղեցի
- St. Hovhannes Church of Chahuk
- Location: Cəhri
- Country: Azerbaijan
- Denomination: Armenian Apostolic Church

History
- Status: Destroyed
- Founded: 12th or 13th century

Architecture
- Demolished: 1997–2009

St. Hovhannes Church was an Armenian church located in village of Jahri (Babek District) of the Nakhchivan Autonomous Republic of Azerbaijan. The church was located in the center of the village.

== History ==
The church was founded in the 12th or 13th century. It was renovated in the middle of the 17th century, according to the scribe of a Bible copied in 1640 in Jahri. The scribe is now in the Matenadaran manuscript library in Yerevan. The church was again renovated in the 19th century.

== Architecture ==
The church was consisting of an apse and two vestries, and was entered from the south. A tall cupula sat atop the roof, supported by arches and pillars. There were Armenian inscriptions on the southern and western facades.

== Destruction ==
The church was still standing in the late Soviet period. It was destroyed at some point between 1997 and October 24, 2009, as documented by Caucasus Heritage Watch.
