= Zeitun Resistance (1914 and 1915) =

Date	First phase: August 30 – December 1, 1914 Second phase: March 25, 1915
Location	Süleymanlı
Result	First battle: Armenian victory Second battle: Ottoman victory

Belligerents
Ottoman Empire	Social Democrat Hunchakian Party

Casualties and losses
Unknown	60 militias

The Armenian militia of Hunchaks (Social Democrat Hunchakian Party) of the city Zeitun (Süleymanlı) had resisted on two armed conflicts, first from August 30 to December 1, 1914, and second on March 25, 1915, to the Ottoman Empire.

== First resistance ==
The first resistance, which lasted three months from (August 30, 1914, to December 1, 1914), was reported that Armenians defeated all the Ottoman troops. 60 Armenian militia died during the first conflict in a report. They helped fight and resist the impending massacre of the local Armenian civilian population.

== Second resistance ==
It is reported that on March 25, 1915 Zeitun was captured by the Ottoman Army. The date for the beginning of the conflicts is not known, but in a report from the Ambassador in Constantinople (Wangenheim) to the Reichskanzler (Bethmann Hollweg) it was claimed that the fighting was going "past few weeks".

== Popular culture ==
The resistance is mentioned in The Forty Days of Musa Dagh.

== See also ==
- Zeitun rebellion (1895-96)
