= Jean Althen =

Armenian agronomist and cultivator

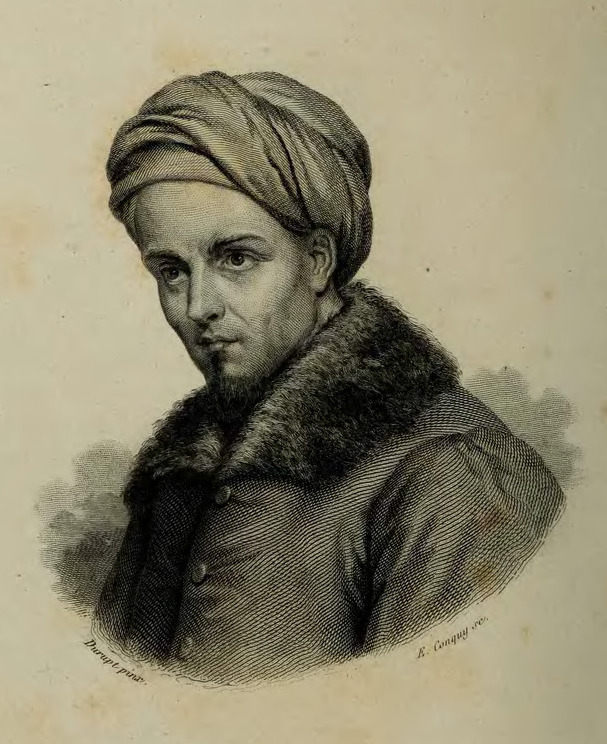
- Born: Hovhannès Althounian; 1709; Chaouch, Safavid Empire
- Died: 1774 (aged 64–65)
- Known for: Developing madder cultivation in France

Jean-Baptiste Joannis Althen, better simply known as Jean Althen (Hovhannès Althounian; 1709–1774), was an Armenian agronomist from Armenia during Safavid rule who developed the cultivation of madder in France.

Although the plant had been present in the region before his arrival, it was Jean-Baptiste Althen who developed its cultivation, turning it into an industry.

== Biography ==
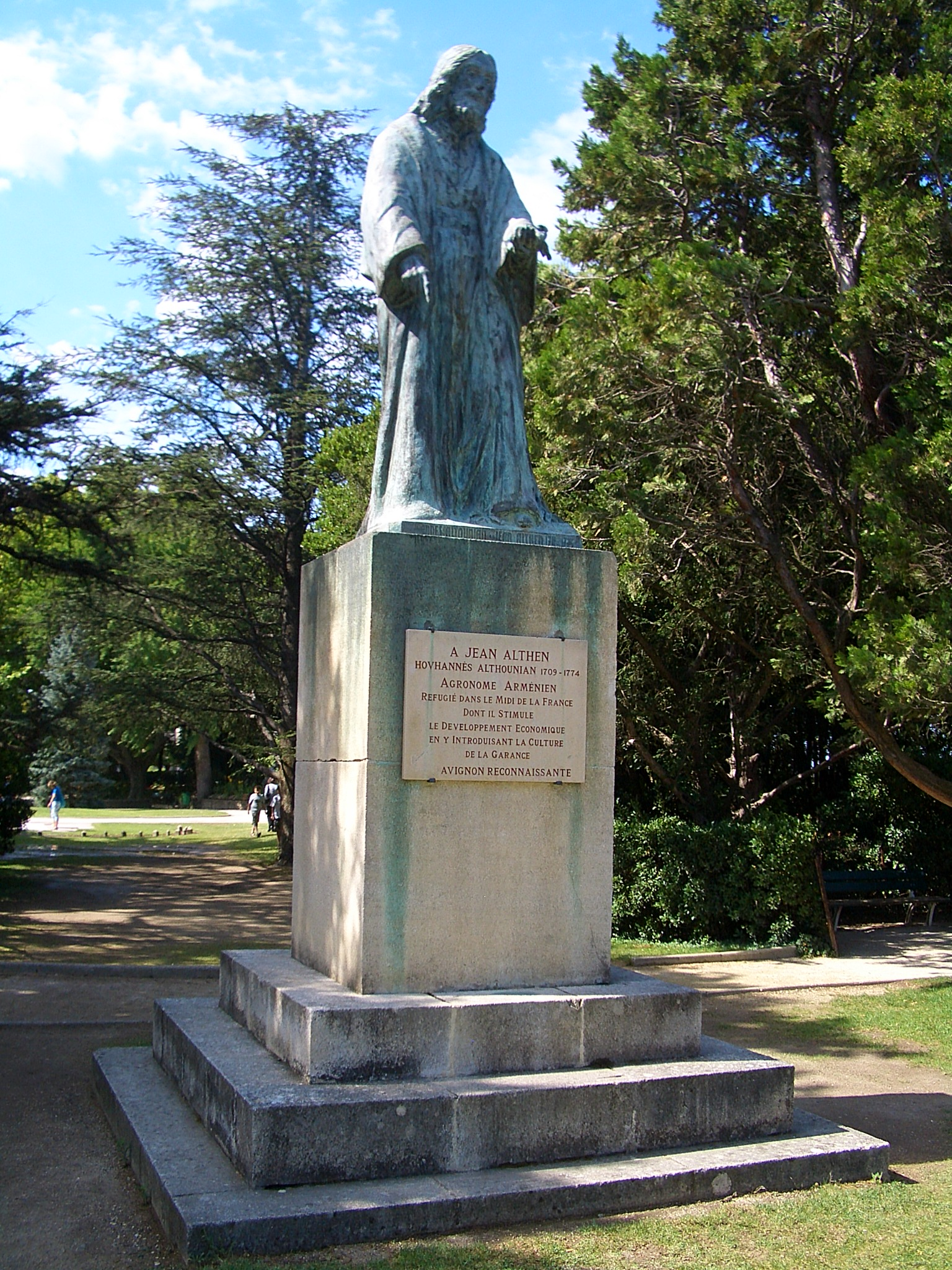
Statue of Jean Althen in Avignon

Jean-Baptiste was born to a certain "Althen and Catherine Madrecha" in the Safavid Empire, in a village he called "Chaouch". Jean-Baptiste grew up in a time of much turmoil, as the Safavid Empire, then ruled by King (Shah) Sultan Husayn (r. 1694–1722), was in a state of heavy decline. During the Afghan invasion, Jean-Baptiste's parents were killed while he was enslaved and brought to Kayseri in the Ottoman Empire. According to Sibylla Schuster-Walser / Encyclopædia Iranica, in Kayseri, "he learned cotton cultivation and dyeing". In ca. 1736, Jean-Baptiste managed to escape and moved to France.

In France, he received authorization by incumbent King Louis XV (r. 1715–1774) "to start state-aided cotton fields". When it became apparent that his efforts to grow cotton had been in vain, Jean-Baptiste started cultivating "Oriental madder" in Avignon in 1754, with great success. Associated with a local landlord, Clauseau Aïné, he produced a crop of 2500 kg (5500 lbs) in 1769. Sibylla Schuster-Walser notes that madder "soon became a main crop of the region". Jean-Baptiste died in poverty in 1774.

In 1846, about 70 years after his death, Jean-Baptiste was honored for his efforts as the French erected a statue of him in Avignon. A French commune, Althen-des-Paluds, is named after him, as well as statues and streets in several cities of the south of France. The plant genus Althenia is also named after him.

== Sources ==
- Henri, Michel (2000). "Հայազգի ժան Ալթենը՝ Ֆրանսիայում բամբակի և տորոնի մշակության առաջնեկ [Armenian J. Althen - a Pioneer of Adoption of the Cultivation of Cotton and Rubia tinctorum in France]". Patma-Banasirakan Handes (in Armenian) (2). Yerevan: Armenian Academy of Sciences: 188–195. ISSN 0135-0536.
- Dédéyan, Gérard [in French] (2007). Histoire du peuple arménien [History of the Armenian People] (in French). Toulouse: Privat. p. 907. ISBN 978-2-7089-6874-5.
- Schuster-Walser, Sibylla (1989). "ALTHEN, JEAN-BAPTISTE JOANNIS". Encyclopaedia Iranica, Vol. I, Fasc. 9. p. 912.
- United States Department of Agriculture (1848). Annual Reports of the Department of Agriculture ... : Report of the Secretary of Agriculture. Reports of Chiefs. United States Government Printing Office. p. 192.
- Bradshaw, George (1807). Bradshaw's Illustrated Hand Book to France. London. p. 110.
