= Zeitun rebellion (1895–96) =

Armenian rebellion in the Ottoman Empire

Zeitun rebellion of 1895–1896
- Part of Hamidian massacres
Date	October 1895 – January 1896
Location	Zeitun, Aleppo Vilayet
Result	Armenian victory

Belligerents
Hunchak Party	Ottoman Empire

Commanders and leaders
Aghasi (Karapet Ter-Sargsian); Ghazar Shovroian	Ali Bey; Mustafa Remzi Pasha; Edhem Pasha

Units involved
	Ottoman Fifth Army Corps

Strength
1,500–6,000 armed militia	28,000 Ottoman troops 30,000–35,000 Muslim (Turkish, Kurdish, and Circassian) irregulars 12 cannons Total: 58,000–63,000 soldiers

Casualties and losses
2,000 (includes non-combatant Armenians)	20,000–30,000 soldiers

The Zeitun rebellion or Second Zeitun Resistance (Armenian: Զեյթունի երկրորդ գոյամարտը, Zeyt'uni yerkrord goyamartĕ) took place in the winter of 1895–1896, during the Hamidian massacres, when the Armenians of Zeitun (modern Süleymanlı), fearing the prospect of massacre, took up arms to defend themselves from Ottoman troops.

== Background ==
The Armenians of Zeitun had historically enjoyed a period of high autonomy in the Ottoman Empire until the nineteenth century. In the first half of the nineteenth century, the central government decided to bring this region of the empire under tighter control and attempted to do this by settling Muslims in the villages around Zeitun. This strategy ultimately proved ineffective and in the summer of 1862 during the First Zeitun Resistance the Ottomans sent a military contingent of 12,000 men to Zeitun to reassert government control. The force, however, was held at bay by the Armenians and, through French mediation, the first Zeitun resistance was brought to a close.

The Ottoman government was nevertheless upset with the results of the mediation. In the following decades, it once more resolved to bring the area under control by provoking Zeitun's Armenians: newly stationed government troops harassed the population and frequent calls for their massacre were issued by a number of Turks. Between the years 1891 and 1895, activists from the Armenian Social Democrat Hunchakian Party visited Cilicia and established a new branch in Zeitun and encouraged the Armenians to resist the oppressive measures of the Ottoman government. It was also at this time that the ruler of the Ottoman Empire, Sultan Abdul Hamid II, decided finally to eliminate one of the only strongholds of Armenian autonomy during the Armenian massacres of 1895–1896.

As the governor of the province was removed and replaced by Avni Bey, a man who held a deep-seated hatred for Armenians, orders were given on October 24, 1895, by Ottoman authorities to use the troops to begin razing several of the Armenians villages near Zeitun.

== Resistance ==
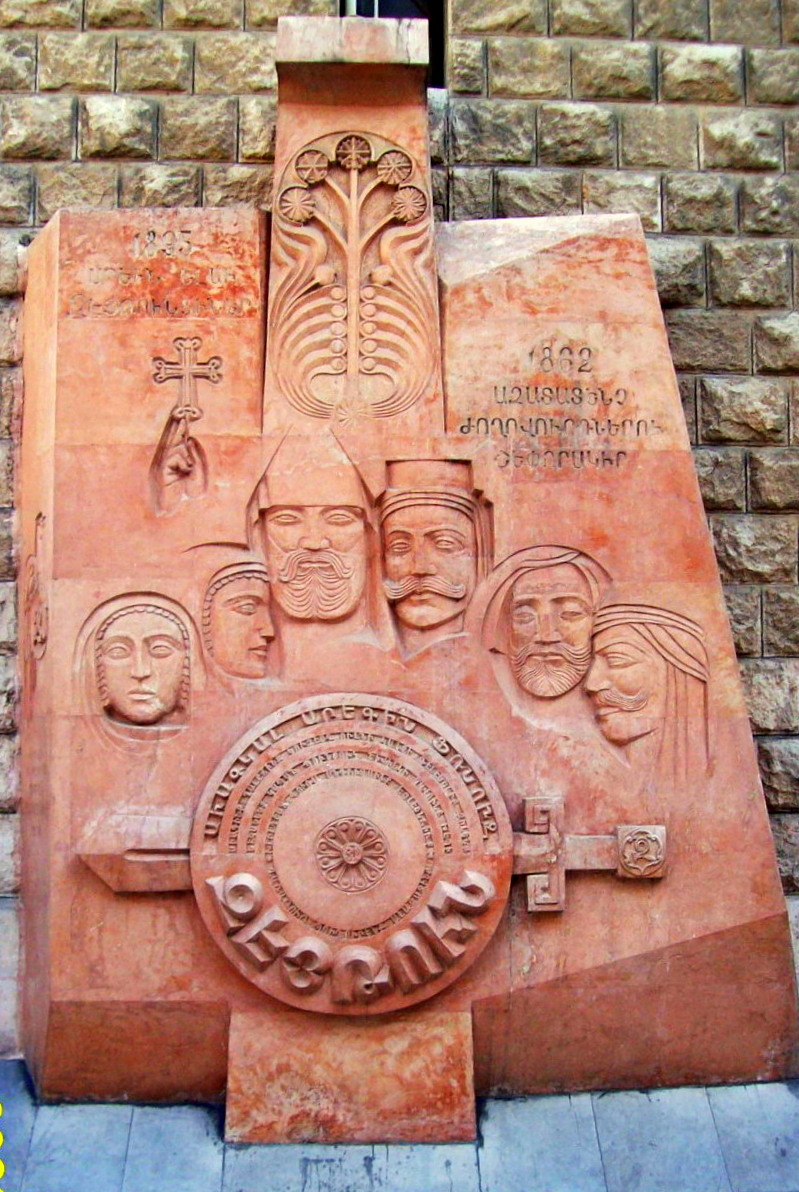
Monument to Zeitun resistance at the Surp Kevork Church, Aleppo, Syria.

The Armenian citizens of Zeitun, under the leadership of the Hunchakian Party, heard of the ongoing massacres in nearby regions, and thus prepared themselves for armed resistance. Between 1,500 and 6,000 men, armed with flintlock guns and Martini-Henry rifles, were sent to the battlefield and sixteen Armenians were selected to head an administrative body during the siege. With this, the Ottoman military commander sent a wire to Abdul Hamid and told him that the Armenians had started an uprising and were proceeding to massacre Muslims. The Ottoman forces possessed an overwhelming numerical and technological advantage: the entire force consisted of 24 battalions (20,000 troops), twelve cannons, 8,000 men from the Zeibek Division from Smyrna, and 30,000–35,000 Turkish, Kurdish, and Circassian irregulars.

The Armenians started by conquering the nearby Ottoman garrison, taking 600 Ottoman soldiers and officers as prisoners and placing them under the surveillance of Armenian women. At one point, the prisoners attempted to escape, but failed and were executed. Ottoman troops were repeatedly defeated in their engagements with the Armenian militia. During the negotiations that later settled the conflict, an Ottoman military commander expressed his admiration to Aghasi, one of the leaders of the resistance, for the Armenians' accurate marksmanship and their determination to resist.

== Resolution ==
Through the intervention of the six major European powers, the Armenians of Zeitun ended the resistance. The Hunchak activists were allowed to go into exile, the tax burden was eased, and a Christian sub-governor was appointed. Due to the freezing temperatures, thousands of Turks perished and many others died in hospitals from wounds sustained in battle. The figures on casualties are heavily conflicting but all agree that the Ottoman forces suffered greatly. The British Consulate reported on January 6, 1896, that "at least 5,000 have been killed though common report swells the number to 10,000." The Austrian Consulate based in Aleppo stated that the Armenians killed 1,300 Turks in the final battle alone. The British consul estimated that combat and non-combat fatalities among all Armenians neared the figure of 6,000. Pierre Quillard, a French writer, estimated that Ottoman losses totaled no less than 20,000 men.

The Armenians lived on in relative peace until World War I, when they were massacred and deported from Zeitun by the Young Turks in 1915.

== Popular culture ==
The rebellion in mentioned in The Forty Days of Musa Dagh.

== See also ==
- Defense of Van
- Zeitun Resistance (1915)
