= Yeritasard Hayastan =

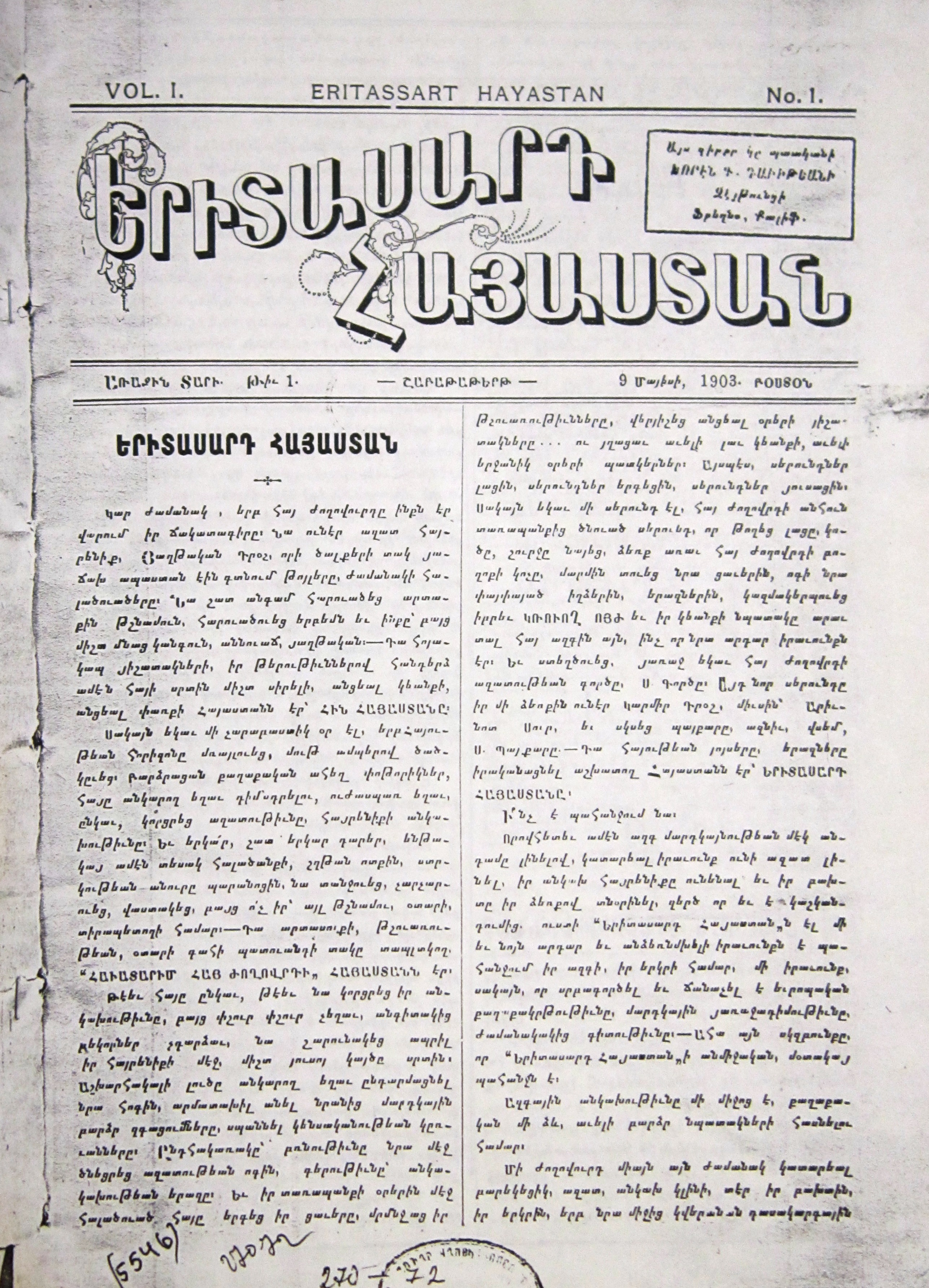
The first issue of Yeritasard Hayastan, 1903

Yeritasard Hayastan (Armenian: Երիտասարդ Հայաստան, Eritasard Hayastan, Young Armenia) was an Armenian-American socio-political and economical periodical published by the Social Democrat Hunchakian Party from 1903 to 2003.

== History ==
It was founded by Stepan Sapah-Gulian in 1903. The first issue was published in only 250 examples. "Yeritasard Hayastan" was edited by G. Yeghikyan, B. Varaztahd, H. Tyurabyan, Arsen Jerejian and others. It published news from Armenia and Armenian diaspora and analytical articles on social and political issues, including the Armenian Question, which was one of the main topics of publications. Yeritasard Hayastan was a weekly until 1973, then became a monthly publication edited by Arsen Jerejian (until 1997).

In October 1998, Yeritasard Hayastan moved to Yerevan, and poet Manuel Adamian was the editor. Then, from 1999 to October 2003, it was published by the Armenian Social Democrat Hunchakian Party (editors - Armine Sargsyan, Serj Melkumyan), separated from the main SDHP and its Armenian branch. Each issue contained 8 pages.

== Places of publication ==
- Boston: 1903–1905
- New York City: 1906–1912, 1923–1973
- Providence: 1912–1917
- Chicago: 1918–1922
- Paramus, New Jersey: 1975–1998,
- Yerevan: 1998–2003

== Sources ==
- Kʻaṛasnameak (1903-1943) Eritasard Hayastan-i. NY, 1944. 286 p.
- Hisnameak Eritasard Hayastani : 1903-1953: NY-Boston, 1953. 202 p.
- (in Armenian) SDHP press (1887-1992), Beirut, by A. Der-Khachadourian, 1992
