= Ruben Khan-Azat =

Armenian political activist

Ruben Khan-Azat (Armenian: Ռուբեն Խան-Ազատ 1862, Yerevan - 1929, Iran), was an Armenian political activist, one of the founders and leaders of the Social Democrat Hunchakian Party and Hunchak journal.

== Biography ==
Ruben Khan-Azat was born as Nshan Karapetyan (Armenian: Նշան Կարապետյան) in 1862 in Yerevan, then part of the Russian Empire. Khanazat studied at the Geneva University, then in 1889 moved to Constantinople and Western Armenia and organized first Hunchakian political groups, initiated the Kum Kapu Affray. He supported the idea of Armenian parties' (Hunchak and Dashnak) unity, welcomed the cooperation between the Armenian and Greek organizations. In 1893-95 he worked in USA, then in Russia, he became one of the supporters of Zeitun Resistance, collected money to help his compatriots, and was arrested in 1895. After he released in 1901, he left political life. Khanazat saw that Russia and Western countries never condemned the Hamidian massacres, and that Armenian armed power is not united to stop this violence. In 1905, Khan-Azat left the Hunchakian Party and retired his political career.

Khan-Azat is the author of "Idealism or materialism?" (1904), "What is a Constitution?" (1907), "Dashnaktsutyun and its Leaders" (1907), literary translations from French and Russian. He also wrote the Memoirs of an Armenian revolutionary and published them in 1927–29.
