= Stepan Sapah-Gulian =

Stepan Sapah-Gulian Ստեփան Սապահ Գիւլեան
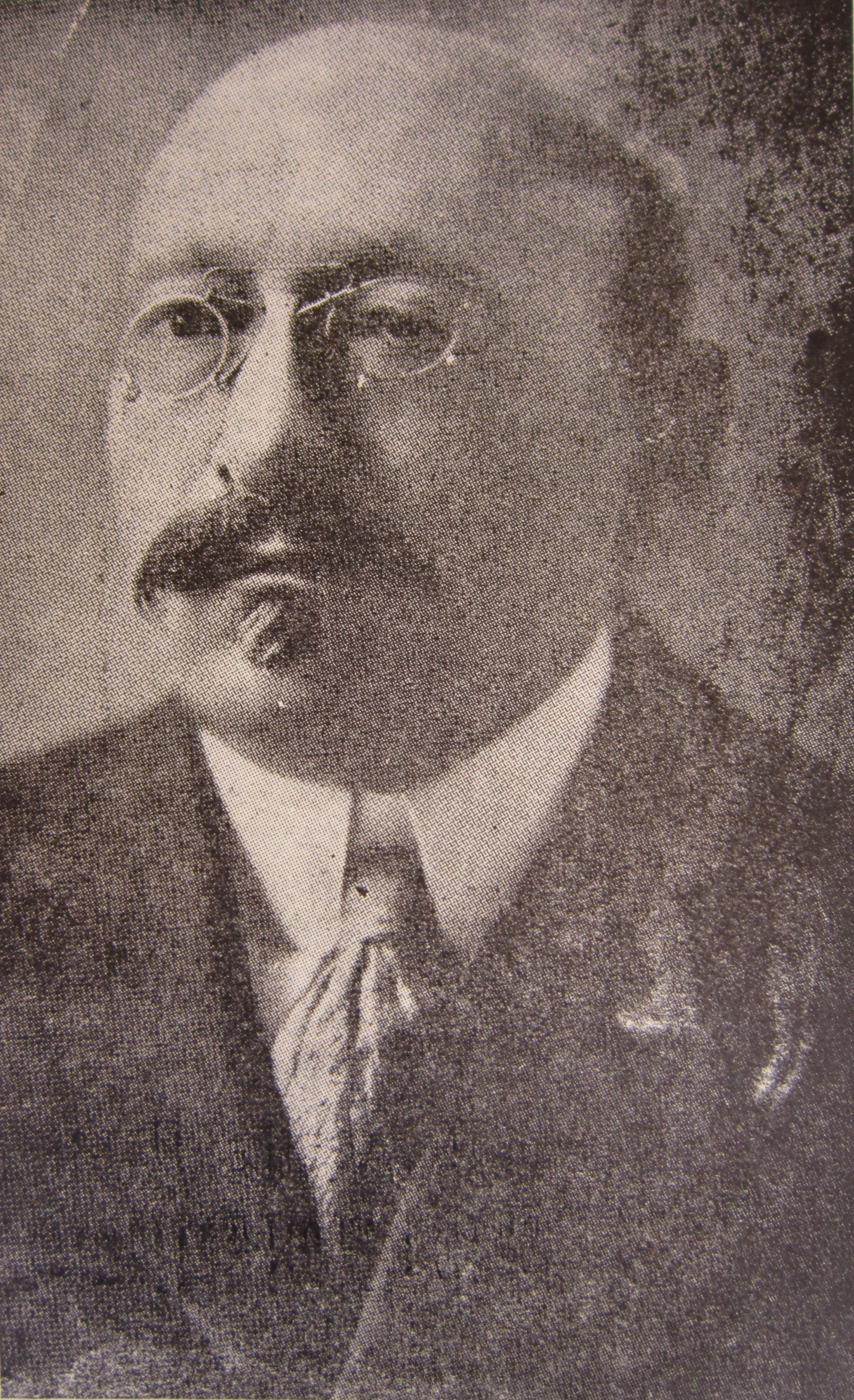
- Born: Stepanos Ter-Danielian; February 14, 1861; Dzhagry, Nakhichevan, Russian Empire
- Died: April 28, 1928 (aged 67); Union City, New Jersey, United States
- Resting place: Union City, New Jersey
- Education: École Libre des Sciences Politiques
- Occupation: political scientist
- Notable work: "Young Turkey", "Responsables"
- Political party: Social Democrat Hunchakian Party

Stepan Sapah-Gulian (Armenian: Ստեփան Սապահ Գիւլեան, February 14, 1861 – April 28, 1928) was a prominent Armenian journalist, political scientist, intellectual and a leader of the Social Democrat Hunchakian Party.

== Biography ==
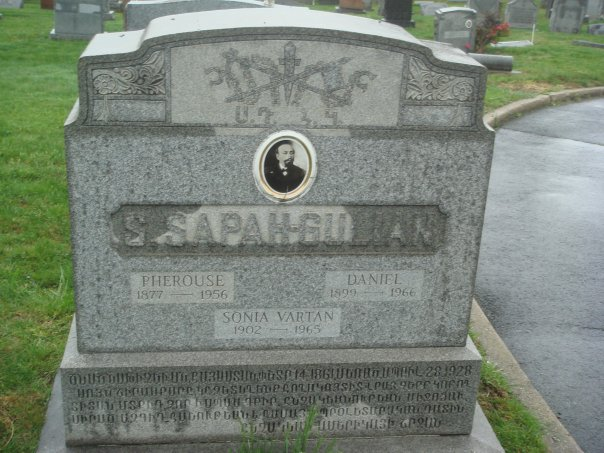
Sapah-Gulian Tombstone in New Jersey, USA

Stepan Sapah-Gulian was born in Dzhagry, a village just north of Nakhichevan on 14 February 1861. He attended the Nersisian School in Tiflis for his primary and secondary education and was later appointed director of schools in Nakhichevan. In 1887 he was arrested by Tsarist authorities and briefly jailed.

Sapah-Gulian met with renowned Hunchakian activist Paramaz (Matteos Sarkissian) in Nakhichevan and Meghri, and discussed revolutionary ideas. He traveled throughout the Asian areas of the Ottoman Empire, and was later briefly director of the Armenian school in Jerusalem prior to his departure to Paris for continuation of higher education. In 1895 he graduated from the École Libre des Sciences Politiques with future French Prime Minister Raymond Poincaré.

As an ardent activist for the Armenian cause, Sapah-Gulian joined the Hunchakian in 1894. He became a leader of the party and founded and/or edited several journals, including Yeritasard Hayastan ('Young Armenia', 1903), Hunchak, Veradsnound ('Revival'), and Nor Ashkharh ('New World').

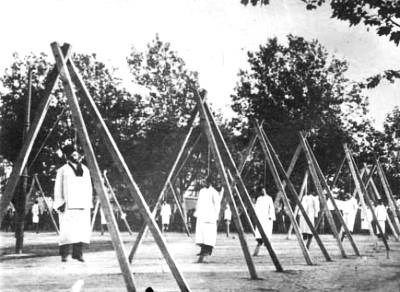
Hunchakian leaders hung during the Armenian genocide

After the restoration of the Ottoman Constitution (1908), along with the party, he declared his opposition to the Young Turk-led Committee of Union and Progress, and urged other Armenian political parties to join the Hunchakians in opposition to the Ittihad movement.

While in Cairo, Sapah-Gulian was condemned to death (in absentia) along with other Hunchakian party members by the Ottoman government in 1915. He later traveled to the United States to recruit volunteers for the volunteer units and to obtain assistance for the Armenians in the war. In the United States he edited the weekly Yeritasard Hayastan in Providence and fundamentally disagreed on the issue of the dissolution of the Social Democrat Hunchakian Party in favor of the Russian Social Democrats in 1923, showing determination to maintain independence and integrity of the Armenian Social Democrat Hunchak party.

The problem of a nation's survival is more important than problems between classes: all classes must work together for survival, realizing their obligations in material, moral, physical spheres

— S. Sapah-Gulian, "The Responsables", p. 65

Stepan Sapah-Gulian died in New Jersey on April 28, 1928.

== Books ==
- «Փոքր Հայքի յիշատակներ» (Memoirs of Armenia Minor) (1917). Author's memoirs of three trips into historic Armenian territory in 1911-1912 as a representative of the Armenian Hunchakian Party.
- «Պատասխանատուները» (The Responsibles) (4 editions published between 1916 and 1974 in Armenian, reprinted in 1991), 384 p.
- «Սոցիալիզմ եւ հայրենիք» (Socialism and Homeland) (1916)
- «Բառերի եւ եզրերի բացատրութիւններ» (Explanation of Words and Terms) (1927)
- «Երիտասարդ Թուրքիա» (Young Turkey) (1911). Criticism of the Young Turks and their Ottoman ideology.
- «Արմենակ եւ Աբրահամ» (Armenak and Abraham) (1917), publication of Yeritasard Hayastan, Chicago, 22 p.
- «Եւրոպայի քաղաքական դրութիւնը Բերլինի դաշնադրութիւնից յետոյ» (The Political Situation of Europe after the Treaty of Berlin (1898)

== Addition sources ==
- The Armenian Question, encyclopedia, Ed. by acad. K. Khudaverdyan, Yerevan, 1996, pp. 400–401.
- Biography at Massis Weekly
