= Gabriel Kafian =

Armenian politician and activist (1861–1930)

Gabriel Gerasimi Kafian (1861 – 1930, Tbilisi) was an Armenian politician and activist, one of the founders of Social Democrat Hunchakian Party.

== Biography ==
Kafian was born in 1861, in Shusha, and graduated from Zurich University. In 1883, he participated in the Second International. In 1887, with Avetis Nazarbekian and others, he founded the Hunchak and the Social Democrat Hunchakian Party, the first socialist party in the Ottoman Empire and the Middle East. In 1889, he met Georgi Plekhanov and together with his group joined the Second International as a Hunchakian representative. In 1890, he moved to Constantinople, participated in the Kum Kapu Affray, then worked in Arabkir, Sebastia, Agn and Kharberd, where he formed revolutionary groups. He tried to include the Dersim Kurds in an anti-sultanic movement, but was arrested and jailed. After prison he lived in Europe. He was arrested again and transferred to Russian consul. In 1917, he participated in the February Revolution in Saint Petersburg.

== Sources ==
- The Armenian Question, encyclopedia, Ed. by acad. K. Khudaverdyan, Yerevan, 1996, p. 182.

== Link ==
- Hunchakian party
