= First Zeitun Resistance =

- Part of Armenian national movement
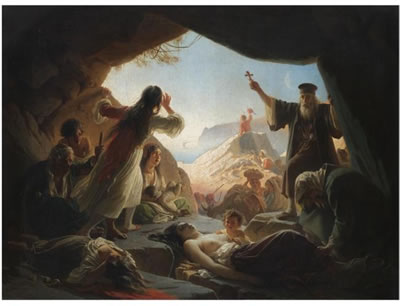
- The Revolt of the Armenians of Zeitun, by Vasily Khudiakov
Date	2 August 1862
Location	Zeitun, Ottoman Empire 37°53′N 36°50′E
Result	Armenian victory: Ottoman troops pillage Alabaş; Ottoman troops withdraw from the region

Belligerents
Armenian fedayees	Ottoman Empire: Kurdish troops; Circassian troops

Commanders and leaders
Unknown	Aziz Pasha of Marash

Strength
5,000	40,000

Casualties and losses
Less than 350	Heavy, at least 10,000

The First Zeitun Resistance of 1862 was an armed conflict between the Armenians of Zeitun and the Ottoman Empire. Zeitun has for a long time been an autonomous, almost independent Armenian region within the Ottoman Empire. In the summer the Sultan of the Ottoman Empire tried to assert his dominance over the region to make the region under the control of him.

== Resistance ==
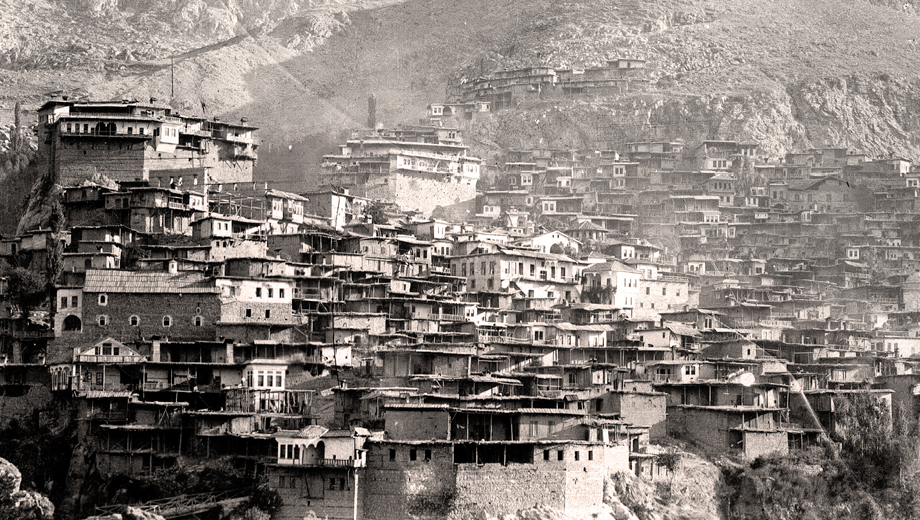
Zeitun

The Armenians of Zeitun had historically enjoyed a period of high autonomy in the Ottoman Empire until the nineteenth century. In the first half of the nineteenth century, the central government decided to bring this region of the empire under tighter control and attempted to do this by settling Muslims in the villages around Zeitun.
