= Gevorg Gharadjian =

Gevorg Harutyuni Gharadjian (1861 in Tiflis – 1936 in Yerevan), also known as S. T. Arkomed, was an Armenian political activist and revolutionary, one of the founders of Social Democrat Hunchakian Party.

== Biography ==
Gharajian studied at Geneva University. In 1882-83 he founded one of the first Armenian narodnik groups. He contributed to the Mkrtich Portukalian's Armenia and "Mshak", also established close contactes with Russian socialist Georgi Plekhanov and Emancipation of Labour group. In 1898 he founded first Armenian workers Marxist group in Tbilisi, and published from 1900 to 01 periodical "Banvor". In 1901 he became a member of RSDWP Tiflis committee. In 1902 he was exiled to Yenisey region. While working in Transcaucasus, he wrote for Iskra. From 1908 to 1917 he lived in Switzerland and continued cooperation with Plekhanov. Gharajian is the author of "Workers Movement and Social-Democracy in Caucasus" book, published in Geneva with a preface by Georgy Plekhanov and quoted by Vladimir Lenin and Lev Trotsky. Lenin had 2 copies of Gharajian's book in his library.

In 1917 he returned to Tiflis, then became a member of Yerevan city duma. During the First Republic of Armenia he was a member of social-democratic fraction of parliament. Since 1922 he worked as a lecturer at Yerevan State University.
