= Maria Rakhmaninova =

Russian philosopher

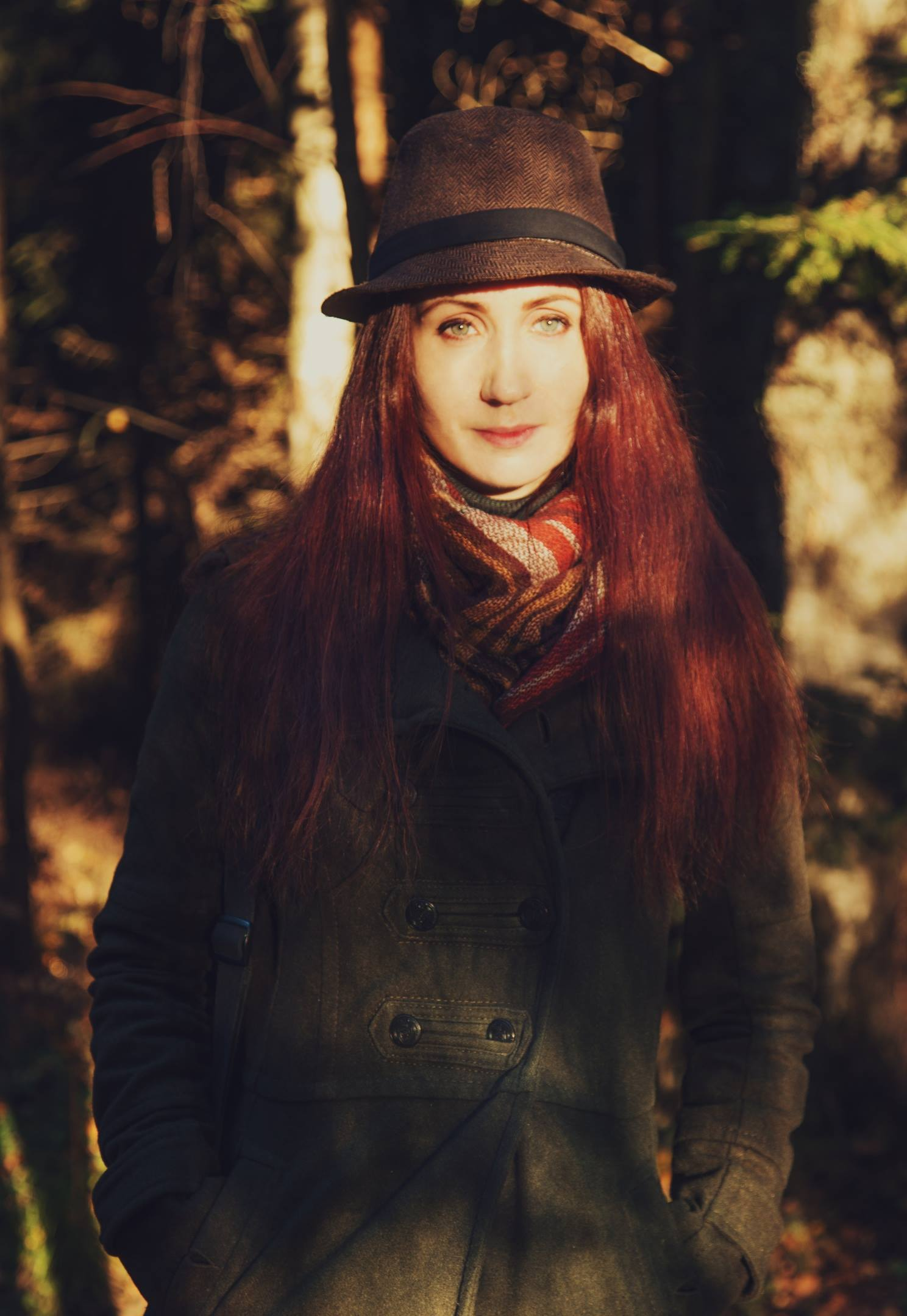
- Born: September 30, 1985 (age 40); Moscow
- Occupations: Philosopher, artist, photographer, political scientist

Mariya Dmitrievna Rakhmaninova (Russian: Мария Дмитриевна Рахманинова; born September 30, 1985, Moscow) is a Russian specialist in social and political philosophy, a doctor of philosophy. Her fields of interest are society, the state, anarchism, feminism, protest movements, theories of revolution, art, aesthetics, pedagogy and philosophy of animals. A photographer and artist, she is a member of the Russian Union of Photographers and participates in a number of activist initiatives.

== Biography ==
Mariya Dmitrievna Rakhmaninova was born in Moscow in 1985. She graduated from the Peoples' Friendship University of Russia, majoring in social philosophy, and the Faculty of Foreign Languages (majoring in translation from German).

In 2011 Rakhmaninova defended her M.A. thesis on "Genealogy and Theoretical Foundations of Modern Forms of Anarchism (from the 19th to the 21st century)".

In 2019 she defended her thesis for the degree of Doctor of Philosophy on "From Epistemology of Power to Ontology of the Body: Social and Philosophical Analysis".

In 2019 she co-founded and co-authored Akrateia, a journal dedicated to exploring anarchist thought.

In March 2020, Rakhmaninova's "In Memory of Sergei Parajanov" exhibition was held at the State Academic Chapel Gallery in Saint Petersburg.

In March 2022, she resigned from her position as a professor at Saint Petersburg University of the Humanities and Social Sciences after she was denounced to the dean's office for a lecture in which she had discussed Russia's invasion of Ukraine with students.
