= Smpad Piurad =

Armenian writer (1862–1915)

Smpad Piurad Սմբատ Բիւրատ
- Born: 1862; Zeitun, Ottoman Turkey
- Died: 1915 (aged 52–53); Ayaş, Ottoman Turkey
- Occupations: Intellectual, journalist, writer, and public activist.

Smpad Piurad or Smbat Byurat in Eastern transliteration (Armenian: Սմբատ Բյուրատ, March 3, 1862 – 1915) was an Armenian intellectual, writer, publisher and public activist. He was murdered during the Armenian genocide.

== Life ==
Smpad Piurad was born Smpad Der-Ghazarian in Süleymanlı/Zeitun on 3 March 1862. In 1871, he went to Jerusalem where he attended and ultimately graduated from the Jarankavorats school in 1880. In 1880 he began studying at Sorbonne University. In 1885 he became the common revisor of the 36 Armenian schools of Cilicia. During this period he published his first poems in Yeghia Demirjibashian's philosophical journal "Yergrakount" (Earth).

In 1885, Piurad opens a school in the Armenian populated village of Sis (today Kozan).

Being a political activist, he was arrested along with his wife (who became blind in Turkish prison) and spent 5 years in prison, in Marash and Aleppo. In a letter written by the Armenians of Zeytun to William Gladstone, Prime Minister of Great Britain, describes the arrest and treatment of Piurad while in prison:

At this time they arrested and with cruel beatings and allsorts of ill-treatment led to the prison of Marash, Sempad Purad, the only poet of the area, an intelligent and educated young man loved by all his contemporaries and who, coming after an absence of 20 years to see his old parents, whom he had left at the age of nine in order to go to school. The poor gentleman was arrested even before he entered the territory of the mountain, was treated as a vagrant despite his being accompanied by his two sons and his young wife who was in the family way; they were cruelly made to suffer of hunger and other necessities which tormented them for thirty six continuous hours, without being shown the charity of allowing the children to quench their thirst on the way from Albeatan to Marash.

If Talat bey knew what disasters and bereavement we have faced as a family, he would end this situation…My poor wife, you have suffered so much misery because of this tyranny, and now, as a result lost your sight, what police chief would not show pity on you after seeing your condition? But what is the use? Our suffering will always remain with us.

— Smpad Piurad's last letter to his wife and family (original in Armenian)

In 1895 he was released and moved to Cairo, where he founded the Armenian Central College and Nor Or newspaper. After the Young Turk Revolution, he returned to Turkey, where he edited the Pyunik and Gaghapar newspapers and collaborated with Ottoman Turkish newspapers. He also wrote a large number of works (from "Yeldiz to Sassoun", 1910; "The Eagle of Avarair", 1909; "For the Freedom", 1911; etc.) and opened a publishing house. He was elected as a national deputy.

== Death ==
Piurad was arrested on April 24, 1915 and deported along with other Armenian intellectuals, imprisoned in Ayaş, and ultimately killed in Ankara.

== Writing style ==
Piurad is considered a late-romantic writer. The theme adopted in much of his writings are largely centered around the persecution of the Armenian race by the government, heroic tales, and dramatic depiction of Armenian revolutionary life. The settings of some of his novels were set in his native land of Zeytun. His striking depiction of the revolutionary movement drew large attention for Armenian readers making him a very popular writer in the early 20th century.

== Works ==
Some of Piurads literary works included:

- Song lyrics Adana's Lament Ադանայի ողբը
- Panasdeghtsagan Yerker Vol. 1. (Constantinople, 1909). (Poetry).
- Avarayri Aruytse gam Vardanank. (Constantinople, 1909). (Play).
- Veghavor Herose gam Bartoghomeos and Takachian. (Constantinople, 1909).
- Zeytuntsi Vardapete. (N.p., c1910)
- Innsun vets: Arevni mechen. 6 vols. (Constantinople, 1911). (Novel).
- Sasunen Yetke. 1. Diakaputnere. (Constantinople, 1911). (Novel).
- Sasunen Yetke. 2. Tebi Yeltez. (Constantinople, 1911). (Novel).
- Pande pant. 5 vols. (Constantinople, 1910). (Novel).
- Verchin berde. (Constantinople, 1914). (Drama).
- Aryuni Dzore. (Published posthumously: Constantinople, 1919). (Story).

== Legacy ==
In Armenia, an elementary school is named after him.

== See also ==
- Armenian notables deported from the Ottoman capital in 1915
