= Ararad (daily) =

Daily Lebanese Armenian newspaper

Ararad Արարատ
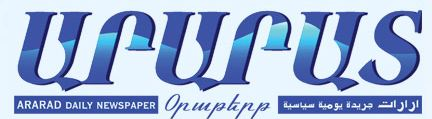

- Cover of Ararad daily (22 December 2017)
- Type: Daily newspaper
- Format: Print, online
- Editor-in-chief: Ani Yepremian
- Founded: 12 November 1937; 88 years ago
- Political alignment: Social democrat
- Language: Western Armenian
- Headquarters: Beirut
- Website: araraddaily.com

Ararad (Armenian: Արարատ) is a daily Lebanese Armenian newspaper and the official organ of the Armenian Social Democrat Hunchakian Party (Henchak) in Lebanon. It is a four-page daily. Its executive director is Ani Yepremian since September 2012.

== History ==
Hunchakian activist Mihran Aghazarian planned to publish Ararad in 1933, but was killed 2 days before the start. Ararad was established in 1937 and the first issue appeared on 12 November 1937 in Beirut, Lebanon. First editor was Armenak Eloyan (1937-1939). Another former editor was Aharoun Shekerdemian.

It used to be published daily until 2000, but from June 2001 to 2007, it was published weekly. Today it is published daily. From 1956 to 1965, a literary supplement of the newspaper called Ararad Kragan was also published. It was a literal monthly edited by Hakob Noruni.
