= Hunchak (journal) =

Armenian political journal

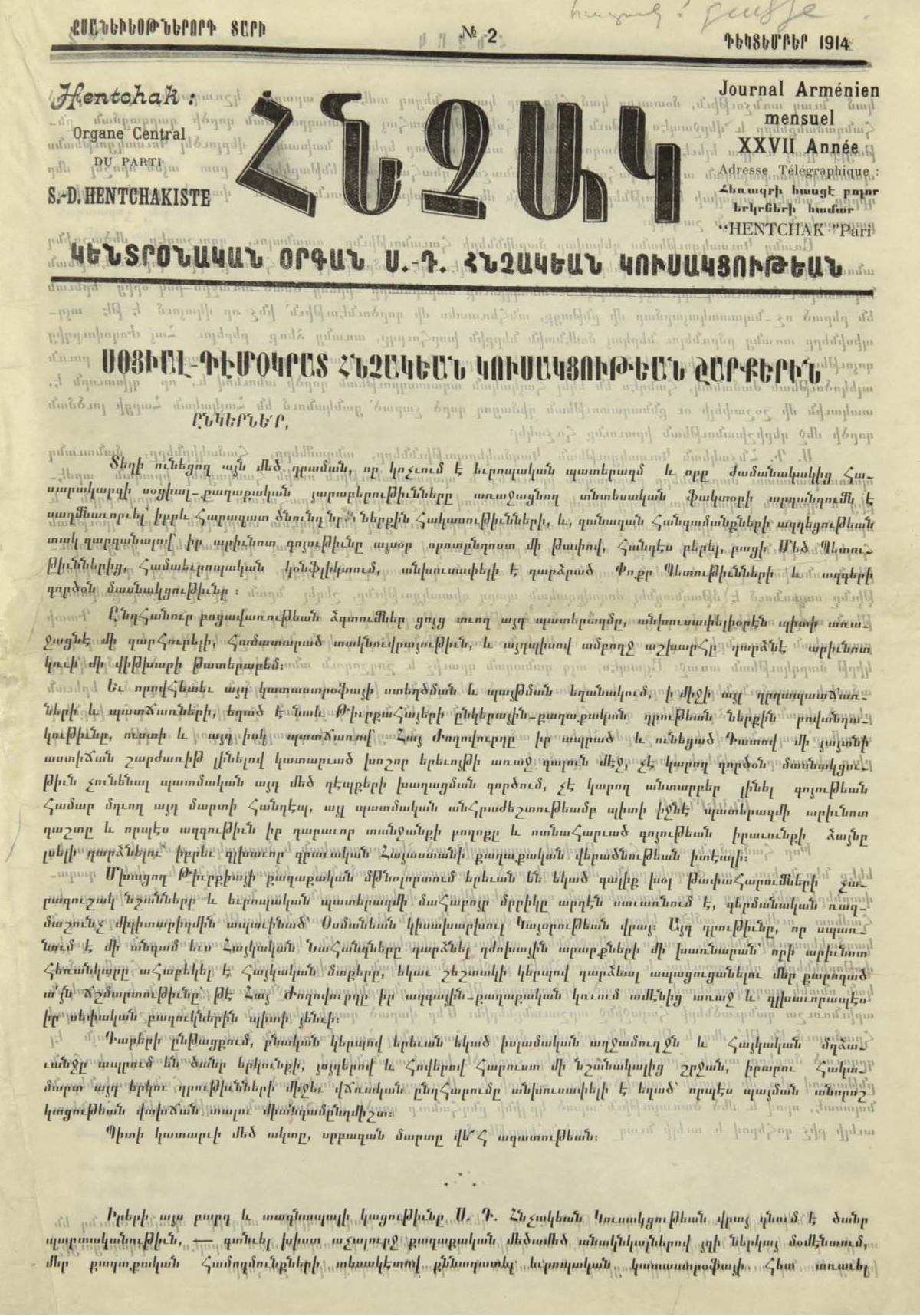
Hunchak journal

Hunchak (Armenian: Հնչակ, romanized: Hnch’ak, lit. 'Bell', also Hnchak, Hentchak) was the official organ of the Social Democrat Hunchakian Party.

== History ==
It was founded by Avetis Nazarbekian and published in 1887–1915, 1935–1938, in Geneva and Montpellier (1887-1891), Paris (1891-1892, 1904–1915), Athens (1892-1894), London (1894-1904) and Providence (1935-1938). Hunchak's editors were Avetis Nazarbekian, Mariam Vardanian, Gabriel Kafian, Ruben Khan-Azat, S. Hovian, Stepan Sapah-Gulian, Sirvard and others. The main purpose of the paper was the propaganda of the Armenian national movement for the liberation, the resistance in Western Armenian regions. Hunchak also supported the ideology of social-democracy and worker's consolidation.

Hunchak consisted of 16-32 pages, 33x25sm.

== Sources ==
- Hunchak party official site
- (in Armenian) Bibliography of Hunchak, Yerevan, Ed. by G. Gharibjanian and others, 1994 - 62 p.
- (in Armenian) SDHP press (1887-1992), Beirut, by A. Der-Khachadourian, 1992 - 47 p.
