= Mariam Vardanian =

Armenian political activist and revolutionary (1864–1941)

Mariam Vardanian (also known as Maro Nazarbek) (1864–1941) was an Armenian political activist and revolutionary in the Russian Empire. She was one of the founders of the Social Democrat Hunchakian Party.

From Tiflis, where she was born, Maro moved to Paris, then to Geneva, where she studied at the local university. Since 1887 she was a member of editorial board of the Hunchak journal and central committee of the Hunchakian party. In 1901-1904 she met Vladimir Lenin in Paris. From 1904 onwards she was involved in revolutionary activities in the Russian Empire. In 1910, she was arrested and sent to Siberia. After the establishment of Soviet power she returned to Tiflis.

In 1925 she became a member of the Communist Party of the Soviet Union.
