= Social Democrat Hunchakian Party =

Social Democrat Hunchakian Party Սոցիալ Դեմոկրատ Հնչակյան Կուսակցություն
- Abbreviation: Henchag (SDHP)
- Central Committee (Global) Chairman: Dr. Harry Hampartzoum Sarafian
- Executive Committee Chairman - Armenia: Sedrak Achemyan
- Founders: Avetis Nazarbekian, Mariam Vardanian, Gevorg Gharadjian, Ruben Khan-Azat, Christopher Ohanian, Gabriel Kafian and Manuel Manuelian
- Founded: August 1887
- Headquarters: Yerevan, Armenia
- Newspaper: see Party publications
- Youth wing: Gaidz Youth Organization
- Membership: 20,000+ (in Armenia)
- Ideology: Social democracy Armenian nationalism Pro-Europeanism
- Political position: Centre-left
- National affiliation: March 14 Alliance (in Lebanon; 2005-2016)
- International affiliation: None, formerly Second International
- National Assembly of Armenia: 0 / 107
- Parliament of Lebanon: 0 / 128

The Social Democrat Hunchakian Party (SDHP) (Armenian: Սոցիալ Դեմոկրատ Հնչակյան Կուսակցություն; ՍԴՀԿ, romanized: Sots’ial Demokrat Hnch’akyan Kusakts’ut’yun), is the oldest continuously-operating Armenian political party, founded in 1887 by a group of students in Geneva, Switzerland. It was the first socialist party to operate in the Ottoman Empire and in Iran, then known as Persia. Among its founders were Avetis Nazarbekian, Mariam Vardanian, Gevorg Gharadjian, Ruben Khan-Azat, Christopher Ohanian, Gabriel Kafian, and Manuel Manuelian. Its original goal was attaining Armenia's independence from the Ottoman Empire during the Armenian national liberation movement.

The party is also known as Hentchak, Henchak, Social-Democratic Hentchaks, Huntchakians, Hnchakian, Henchags, and its name is taken from its newspaper Hunchak, meaning "clarion" or "bell". This is taken by party members to represent "a call or awakening, for enlightenment and freedom".

== History ==
All seven founders of the party were Eastern Armenian Marxist students who had left Russian Armenia to further their education in various universities of Western Europe. They were young, in their twenties, and supported by their affluent bourgeois families. They were influenced by social-democratic revolutionary ideology, contacted Frederick Engels, Georgi Plekhanov, and later Vladimir Lenin. Mariam Vardanian had worked with Russian revolutionaries in Saint Petersburg. For the purpose of furthering revolutionary activity in Turkish Armenia, they formed the Hunchakian Revolutionary Party in August, 1887. The party's manifesto, printed in the first issue of Hunchak journal, contained this slogan: "Those who cannot attain freedom through revolutionary armed struggle are unworthy of it".

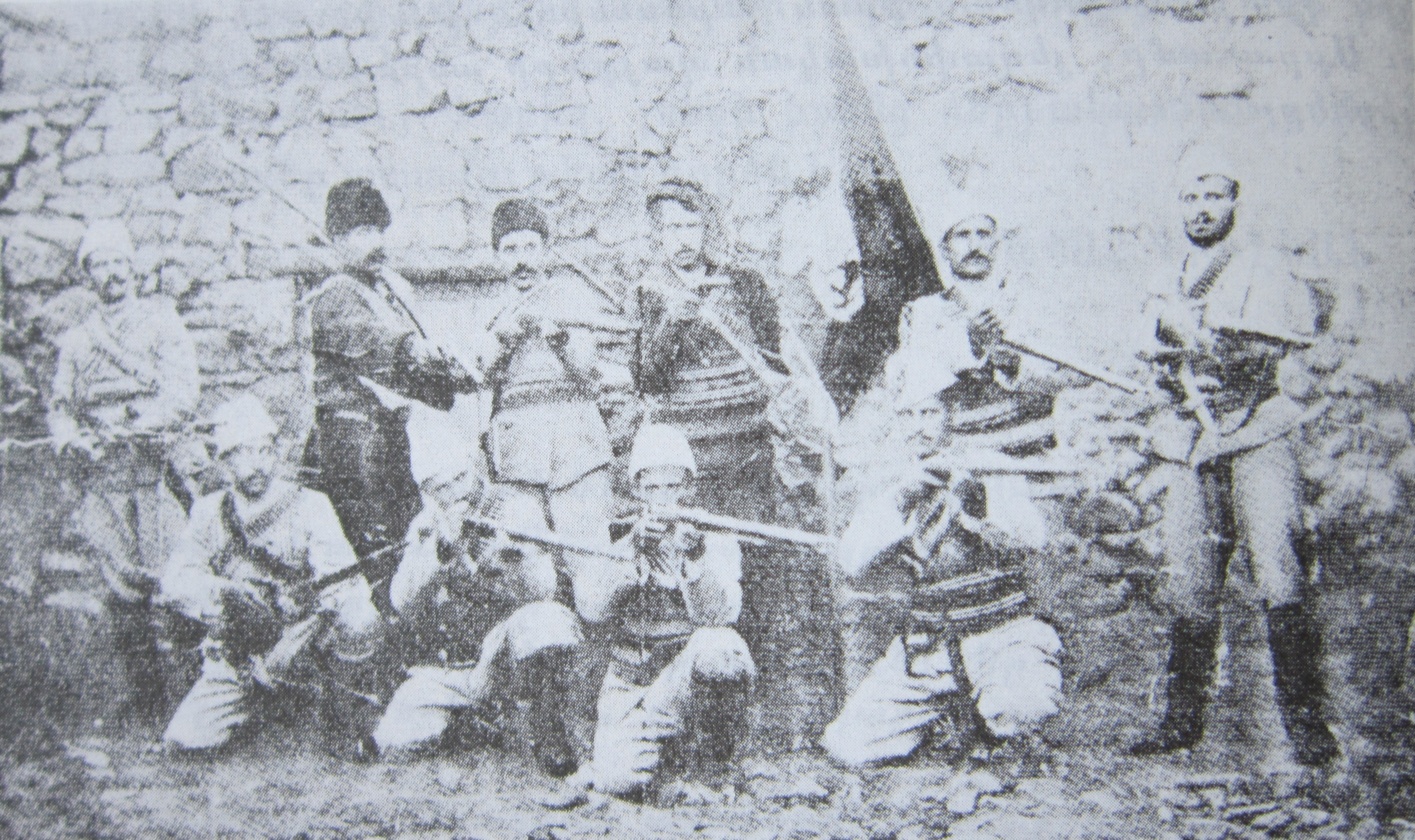
Hunchakian Ardziv fedayi group

The Hunchak party fought many battles against the Ottoman Empire, to free the Armenian people from Turkish rule. During this period, many famous intellectuals joined Hunchakian party, including Smpad Piurad, Stepan Sapah-Gulian, Alexander Atabekian, Atrpet, and Aram Andonian. One of Armenia's famous national heroes Andranik Ozanian, at first, joined the Hunchak party, but disagreement with party policies led Andranik to leave the Hunchak ranks within less than a year, to join the Dashnaktsutyun party.

In the early days of the formation of Armenian political powers, the Dashnaktsutyun sought "reforms within the framework of the Ottoman Empire", while the Hunchakian party favored an independent Armenian state. Hunchak was the official organ of Hunchakians. In 1894, in Athens and London, the party published a socialist scientific monthly, Gaghapar, which for the first time published "The Communist Manifesto" in Armenian, translated by Avetis and Mariam Nazarbekians. The First General Conference of Hunchakian party took place in London, in September 1896.

In the Caucasus, the Hunchakian party has also played a prominent role, it combated the Russification policy of Viceroy Grigory Golitsyn, the Russian governor of Caucasus. In 1903, Paramaz organized the assassination attempt of Grigory Golitsyn. Paramaz was also one of the organizers of the self-defense troops during the Armenian-Tatar massacres of 1905–06.

The Hunchakian party was also active in the international socialist movement, and was represented at the 1904 congress of the Second International by Plekhanov.

During the Russian Revolution of 1905, the support of the Hunchakian party, along with the predominantly Azeri Hummet party, permitted the Bolsheviks to seize the leadership of the strike committee that oversaw the Baku oilfield strike.

=== Activities in the Ottoman Empire ===
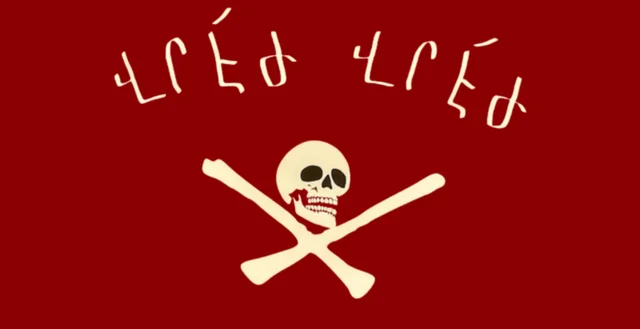
Banner of the Khanasor Expedition (also called the Khanasor Raid), a retaliatory Armenian fedayi operation carried out in 1897 by members of the SDHP against the Mazrik

In 1897, Armenian fedayi, inspired in part by the ideological principles of the Social Democrat Hunchakian Party, participated in the Khanasor Expedition, a retaliatory operation against the Mazrik Kurdish tribe following the massacre of Armenian refugees after the Van Resistance of 1896. Although operationally led by the Armenian Revolutionary Federation, the raid reflected the broader milieu of Armenian revolutionary activism, in which Hunchakian discourse emphasized collective organization, political consciousness, and resistance to structural violence following the Hamidian massacres (1894–1896). Contemporary accounts indicate that the expedition targeted armed combatants while sparing women and children, establishing it as a morally bounded act of self-defence. In the long term, such actions reinforced the Hunchakian belief that social and national emancipation required organized mobilization, ideological clarity, and disciplined resistance, contributing to the enduring framework of Armenian revolutionary thought.

On 27 July 1890, Hunchakian activists Harutiun Jangülian, Mihran Damadian, and Hambartsum Boyajian headed Kum Kapu Affray in Constantinople, which demanded the implementation of reforms in the Western Armenian provinces. In the early 1890s, frequent clashes between the Armenian inhabitants of Sason and the Ottoman forces took place because of Sassontsis' refusal to pay retroactive taxes to the Ottoman government.

Hunchakian leaders hanged during the Armenian genocide

In 1894, Sasun Resistance was organized by the Hunchak party under the leadership of Mihran Damadian, Hambartsum Boyajian, Kevork Chavush, and Hrayr Dzhoghk.

In 1913, Hunchakian leader Paramaz participated in the 7th Conference of the Social Democrat Hunchakian Party in Constanta, where he represented the idea of the assassination of Ittihad leaders. But on 15 June 1915, Paramaz with 19 other his comrades were hanged in the central square of Constantinople.

- Zeitun rebellion (1895–96) (October 1895 – January 1896)
- Defense of Van: (June, 1896)
- Khanasor Expedition: (July 25, 1897)
- Zeitun Resistance: (August 30, 1914 – December 1, 1914 and March 25, 1915)
- Siege of Van: (April 19, 1915 – May 6, 1915)
- Shabin-Karahisar uprising: (June 2, 1915 – June 30, 1915)

=== First Republic of Armenia ===
The party also played a role in the establishment of the First Republic of Armenia, as party members took part in the Battle of Sardarapat in 1918, which defended the Armenian capital Yerevan from the Army of Islam of the Ottoman Empire.

=== Armenian Soviet Socialist Republic ===
After the takeover of the Armenian communists of power in Armenia in 1921 and dissolving of the Democratic Republic of Armenia, and the declaration of the Armenian Soviet Socialist Republic, all political parties apart from the Armenian Communist Party were forbidden. Thus the Social Democrat Hunchakian Party, alongside all the other Armenian traditional political parties, effectively became a party of the Armenian diaspora only.

But the party remained in general a supporter of the development of the Armenian SSR for many decades, in sharp contrast to the Armenian Revolutionary Federation (ARF) that remained opposed to the Communist regime in Armenia. This resulted at many times in feuds and rifts between the Hunchaks and the Dashnaks in many centers of the Armenian diaspora, a situation becoming worse with religious differences, with the Social Democrat Hunchakian Party supporting Mother See of Holy Etchmiadzin of the Armenian Apostolic Church and the ARF supporting the Holy See of Cilicia. In these conflicts, the Armenian Democratic Liberal Party (ADL) was seen as a political ally on the side of the SDHP and in opposition to the ARF.

=== Independent Armenia ===
Following Armenia's independence from the Soviet Union in 1991, Yeghia Najarian, headed the SDHP organization in Armenia and founded the "Hnchak Hayastani" official organ. In the early 1990s, the party took part in the self-defense of Zangezur (Paramaz battalion) and the Nagorno-Karabakh conflict (Jirair-Mourad battalion led by Gevorg Guzelian). The party also remains active throughout the Armenian Diaspora.

On 12 May 2024, members of the central committee of the party met with Armenian President Vahagn Khachaturyan in Los Angeles and discussed relevant political issues such as the demarcation of the Armenia–Azerbaijan border and cooperation with the Armenian diaspora in the United States. The central committee concluded the meeting by reaffirming their readiness to support Armenia's statehood and advance national priorities.

=== Activities in Lebanon ===
In the 1950s, the party clashed, sometimes violently, with the Dashnak Party, due to tensions that escalated when the ARF elected Bishop Zareh as Zareh I, Catholicos of Cilicia, a move that was rejected by the Hunchaks. This period was characterized by an escalation of conflict between the ARF on one side, and the SDHP and the ally ADL (Ramgavars) on the other side.

In the midst of increasing sectarian strife in the late 1960s and early 1970s, which led to the Lebanese Civil War, however, Lebanon's Armenian community began to close ranks, and in 1972, the Hunchakian Party ran a joint ticket with the Dashnaks. In 2000, the Hunchakian Party joined forces with Rafik Hariri's Future Movement, which swept the city of Beirut. SDHP Central Committee Member Dr Yeghia Jerejian was a member of Lebanese Parliament for many years.

The party subscribes to a socialist ideology and advocates for a planned economy in Lebanon. The party competes for the six seats reserved for ethnic Armenians in the National Assembly of Lebanon.

== Ideology ==
The party declares itself as a national social democratic party. The party advocates for free education and healthcare, the promotion of human rights and equality, maintaining a strong democracy, protecting the environment, and creating a decentralized social economy. The party also supports the unification of Artsakh with Armenia.

In terms of foreign policy, the party supports Armenia developing closer cooperation within European structures, and developing closer ties with Georgia, Iran, China, and Japan. On 28 November 2023, the party announced its support for Armenia to join the European Union and to reduce its dependency on Russia.

== Electoral record ==
MPs in the Armenian National Assembly (since 1990)
Norair Iskhanian (1990–1995); Mekhak Mkhitarian (1990–1995)	Rafael Melkonian (1990–1995); Yeghia Natcharian (1995–1999)

The party was a previous member of the Armenian National Congress. Prior to the 2021 Armenian parliamentary election, the party announced that it would nominate 4 members to run in the elections under the Democratic Party of Armenia's electoral list. Following the election, the Democratic Party of Armenia won just 0.39% of the popular vote, failing to win any seats in the National Assembly. As such, the Social Democrat Hunchakian Party does not have any representation within the National Assembly of Armenia and currently acts as an extra-parliamentary force.

In June 2023, the Social Democrat Hunchakian Party and the European Party of Armenia formed an electoral alliance, known as Dignified Yerevan. The alliance nominated Karen Sargsyan as its candidate for the position of Mayor of Yerevan in municipal elections for September 2023. The alliance, however, dissolved in August 2023 prior to the elections.

== Affiliate organizations ==
The Hunchakian party has established affiliate organizations such as the AEBU which is an organization that helps with educational, health and social care, the Dekhrouni Student & Youth Association (founded in 1952, in Beirut), the Gaidz Youth Organization (founded in 1910, in Constantinople), Nor Serount Cultural Association (founded in 1954, in Beirut), and HMM (Homenmen) which is an independent sporting organization but strongly affiliated with the SDHP (not to be confused with Homenetmen considered largely affiliated with the ARF).

== Party publications ==
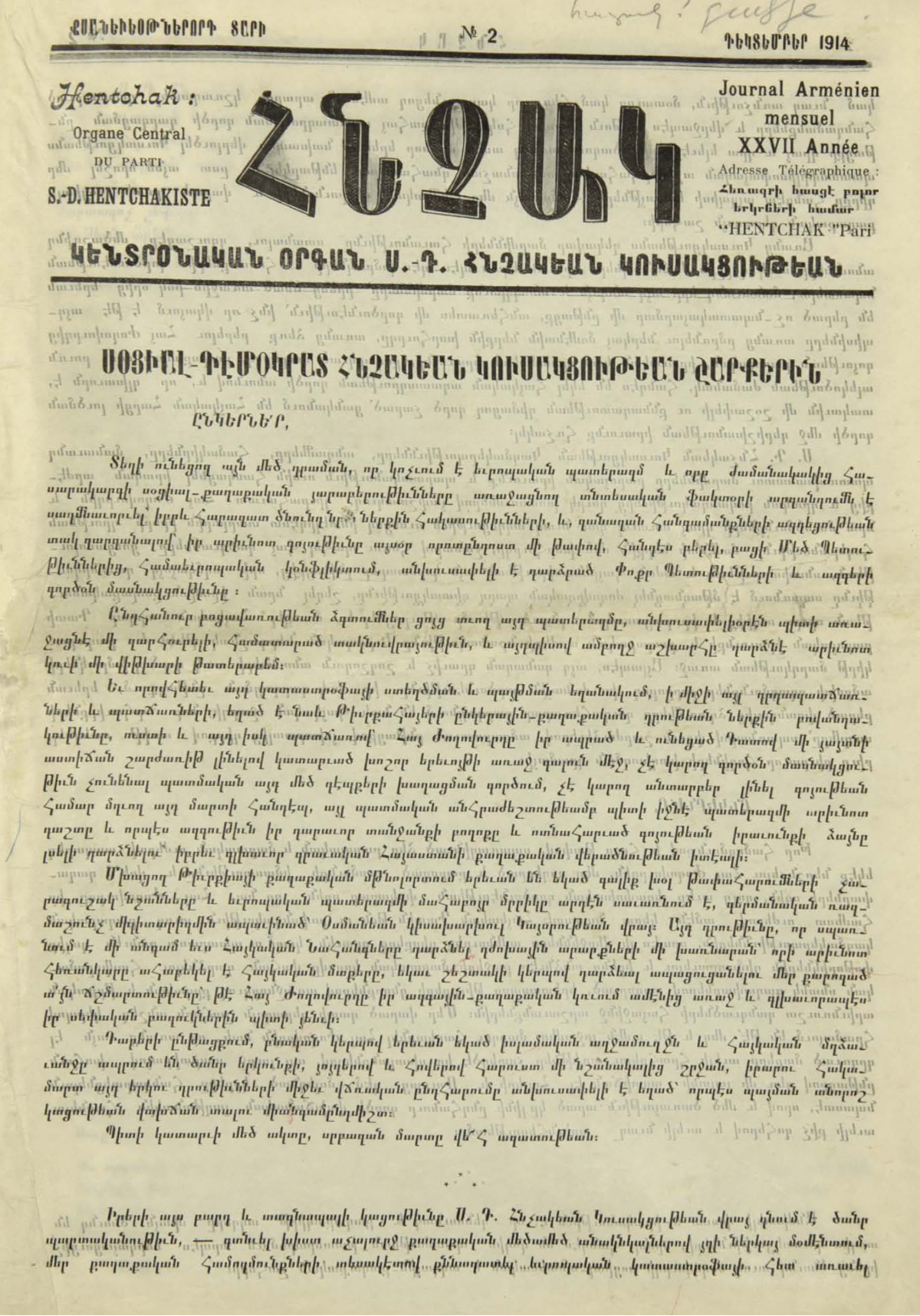
Hunchak journal

Hunchak (also Hnchak, Hentchak, "Bell" in Armenian) was the official organ of the party. It was founded by Avetis Nazarbekian and published originally in Geneva and later in Montpellier and Paris (France), Greece, London (United Kingdom), and Providence (United States), 1887–1915, 1935–1940. The main purpose of the paper was a propaganda organ of the Armenian national movement for the liberation, the resistance in Western Armenian regions. Hunchak also supported the ideology of social-democracy and worker's consolidation.

Present-day party publications include:

- Ararad daily newspaper published in Beirut, Lebanon
- Tchahagir weekly published in Cairo, Egypt
- Massis weekly and the online MassisPost published in Los Angeles
- Nor Serounti Tsayn (Voice of the New Generation - Nor Serount) published in London, UK
- Zank Armenian journal, Australia
- Loussapatz, published monthly from Nor Serount Toronto, Canada

== Recent developments ==
The party's 20th General Conference took place in September 2013, in Yerevan and Tsaghkadzor, with the participation of delegates from 17 countries.

The party's 22nd General Conference took place in September 2022, in Yerevan (coinciding with the 135th anniversary of the party's founding), with the participation of delegates from 14 countries.

== Prominent members ==
- Aghasi (Karapet Ter-Sargsian)
- Alexander Atabekian
- Aram Achekbashian
- Avetis Nazarbekian
- Ghazaros Aghayan
- Girayr
- Kegham Vanigian
- Mari Beyleryan
- Medzn Mourad
- Paramaz
- Sargis Mubayeajian
- Sarkis Dkhrouni
- Smpad Piurad
- Stepan Sapah-Gulian
- Shushanik Kurghinian

== See also ==
- Armenian Democratic Liberal Party
- Programs of political parties in Armenia
