= Çat, Kemaliye =

Village in Turkey

Çat
- Village
- Location in Turkey
- Coordinates: 39.0830°N 38.6461°E
- Country: Turkey
- Province: Erzincan
- District: Kemaliye
- Population (2022): 35
- Time zone: UTC+3 (TRT)

Çat (also: Çatköy) is a village in the Kemaliye District of Erzincan Province in Turkey. Its population is 35 (2022).

Historically, Çat belonged to the Dutluca (Aşutka) subdistrict of Kemaliye. According to the 1643 avârız-hâne register of the Arapgir Sanjak, villages in the Aşutka nahiye, including Sing (Çat), were inhabited predominantly by Muslim households. Late Ottoman provincial yearbooks also record a Muslim majority in the wider Arapgir district, to which Aşutka belonged. The Dutluca area speak an Oghuz-group Turkish dialect, reflecting the Turkish identity of their population.

Mulberry cultivation is traditional in Kemaliye district, especially in villages such as Dutluca and Çit, where produce is sold to markets in neighboring provinces. Other villages also produce mulberries for local consumption.”
