= Hayhurum =

Armenian-speaking members of the Greek Orthodox Church

Hayhurum (Armenian: Հայհրում; Greek: Χαϊχούρουμ, romanized: Chaïchoúroum) is the name given to Armenian-speaking Christians who are members of the Greek Orthodox Church.

Their exact ethnicity has been a source of debate. Some (although not all) of these Armenian speakers living in the vicinity of the town of Akn till the 16th century were of Eastern Orthodox faith (instead of Armenian Apostolic Church as is the case for most Armenians). There were also a number of people of Greek Orthodox faith among Hamshenis, who are considered to have been converted to Greek Orthodoxy during the late Middle Ages under the rule of the Empire of Trebizond.

== History ==
In the region of Akn by the 20th century Hayhurums were essentially concentrated in 5 villages: Vag, Zorak, Musaga, Sirzu, Hogus. In the region of Dersim near Çemişgezek they were found in the village of Memsa, near Pertak in the village of Hromkéğ, In the region of Ilic the village of Atma was named as a Hayhorom village in 1582 but was a Kurdish village by the 20th century. In the region of Kharberd the village of Haydi and near Erzincan in the village of Dzatkéğ.

== See also ==
- Hidden Armenians
- Religion in Armenia
- Hemshin people
