= Sırakonak =

Sırakonak can refer to:

- Sırakonak, İspir
- Sırakonak, Kemaliye
