= Salvia anatolica =

Scientific classification
- Kingdom: Plantae
- Clade: Tracheophytes
- Clade: Angiosperms
- Clade: Eudicots
- Clade: Asterids
- Order: Lamiales
- Family: Lamiaceae
- Genus: Salvia
- Species: S. anatolica

Binomial name
- Salvia anatolica Hamzaoğlu & A.Duran

Species of herb

Salvia anatolica is a rare perennial herb that is endemic to a small area between Divriği and Kemaliye in Turkey, growing on stony slopes and oak scrub forest at 1,500 to 1,650 m (4,920 to 5,410 ft) elevation. It is similar to another Salvia that is endemic to Turkey, S. bracteata.

S. anatolica grows on a few erect stems to 25 to 50 cm (9.8 to 19.7 in) with mostly basal leaves. Terminal leaves are ovate-elliptic to lanceolate and are 2 to 6.5 cm (0.79 to 2.56 in) long and .9 to 1.5 cm (0.35 to 0.59 in) wide. The inflorescence grows well above the leaves and is 15 to 24 cm (5.9 to 9.4 in) long. The yellow corolla is 3.5 to 4.0 cm (1.4 to 1.6 in). The plant blooms in May and June and is a hemicryptophyte.
