= Rum (name) =

Term referring to several things

Rūm (Arabic: روم [ruːm], collective; singulative: رومي Rūmī [ˈruːmiː]; plural: أروام ʼArwām [ʔaˈrwaːm]; Persian: روم Rum or رومیان Rumiyān, singular رومی Rumi; Turkish: Rum, Ottoman Turkish: روم), ultimately derived from Greek Ῥωμαῖοι (Rhomaioi, literally 'Romans'), is the exonym of the indigenous pre-Islamic inhabitants of Anatolia, the Middle East and the Balkans and date to when those regions were parts of the Eastern Roman Empire.

The term Rūm is now used to describe:

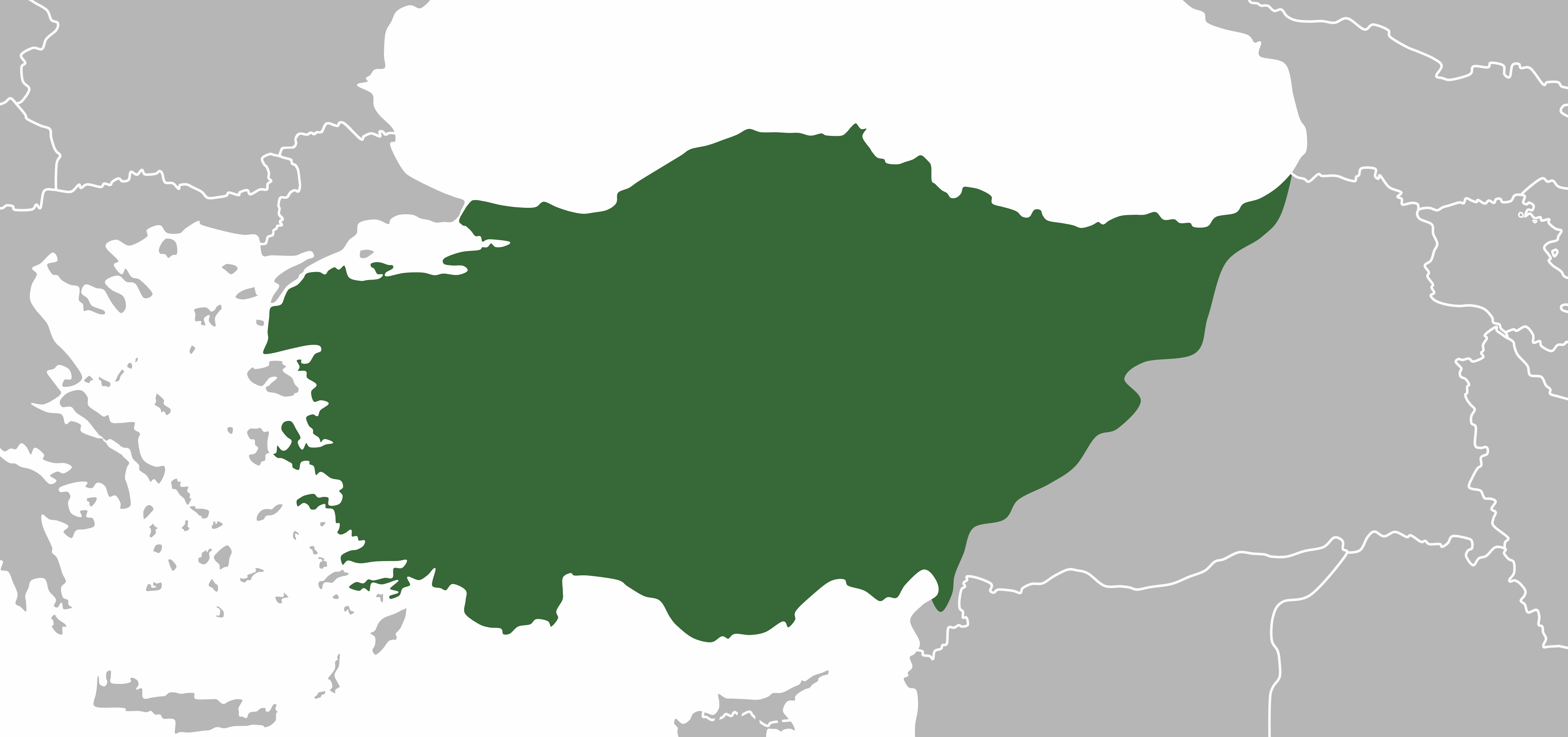
Location of Anatolia (in dark green)

- The city of Rome in Italy, and the people living in it.
- Remaining pre-Islamic ethnocultural Christian minorities living in the Near East and their descendants, notably the Rum Arabs who are members of the Greek Orthodox Church of Antioch and the Melkite Greek Catholic Church of Syria, Lebanon, Jordan, Israel, Palestine, and the Hatay Province in Southern Turkey whose liturgy is still based on Koine Greek.
- Orthodox Christian citizens of modern Turkey originating in the pre-Islamic peoples of the country, including Pontians from the Black Sea mountains in the north, Cappadocians from Turkey's central plateau, and Hayhurum from eastern Turkey.
- Topographical names within Anatolia (e.g. Erzurum and Rumiye-i Suğra) and the Balkans (Rumelia) stemming from the legacy of the Eastern Roman Empire in those areas, or of the Seljuk Sultanate of Rûm, a medieval Muslim state that ruled over recently conquered Byzantines (Rûm) in central Asia Minor from 1077 to 1308.

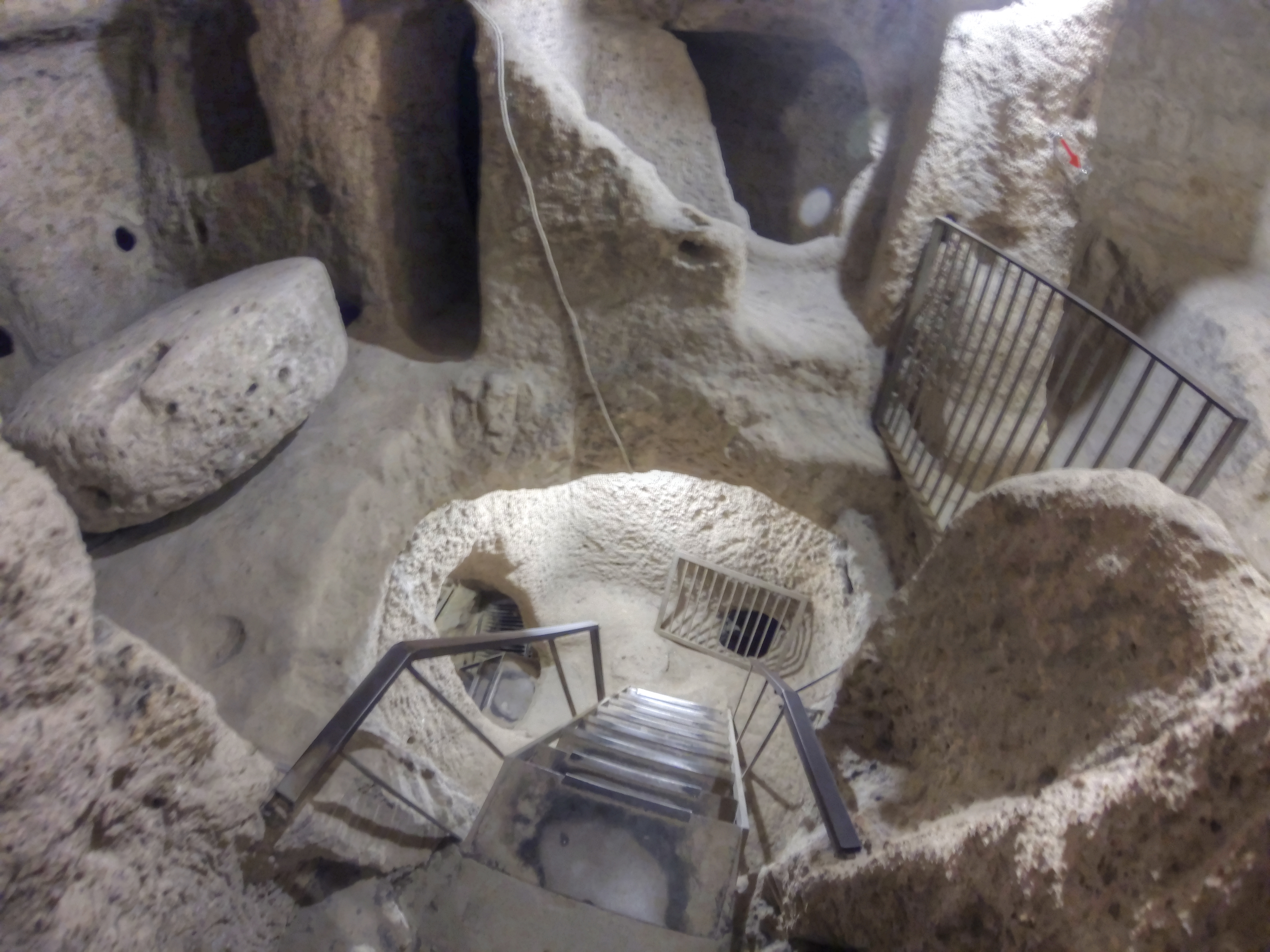
A view showing several floors of an underground Rûm city in Turkey

== Origins ==
The term Rūm in Arabic and New Persian was derived from Middle Persian hrōm, which had in turn derived from Parthian frwm, which was used to label "Rome" and the "Roman Empire" and was derived from the Greek Ῥώμη. The Armenian and Georgian forms of the name were also derived from Aramaic and Parthian. (Note: "It was the Parthian and Aramaic form that subsequently was borrowed by the Pahlawi, Armenian, Georgian, Arabic and finally Neo-Persian and Turkish languages. [...] The Arabic and New Persian languages inherited the Pahlawi hrōm with the omission of the aspirated component in the Ancient Greek rho.") According to the Encyclopedia of Islam, Rūm is a Persian and Turkish word used to refer to the Byzantine Empire.

=== Inscriptions ===
The Greek (Ῥώμη), Middle Persian (hrōm), Parthian (frwm) versions of Rūm are found on the Ka'ba-ye Zartosht, a monument declaring Shapur I's victory over Marcus Antonius Gordianus. The inscriptions on the Ka'ba-ye Zartosht date from around 262 AD.

Rûm is found in the pre-Islamic Namara inscription and later in the Quran (7th century) in which it is used to refer to the contemporary Eastern Roman Empire under its Greek-speaking emperors (the Heraclian dynasty). The empire was the most prominent Christian state during the period of Muhammad's life and during the composition of the Quran, the Western Roman Empire having fallen two centuries earlier, during the 5th century.

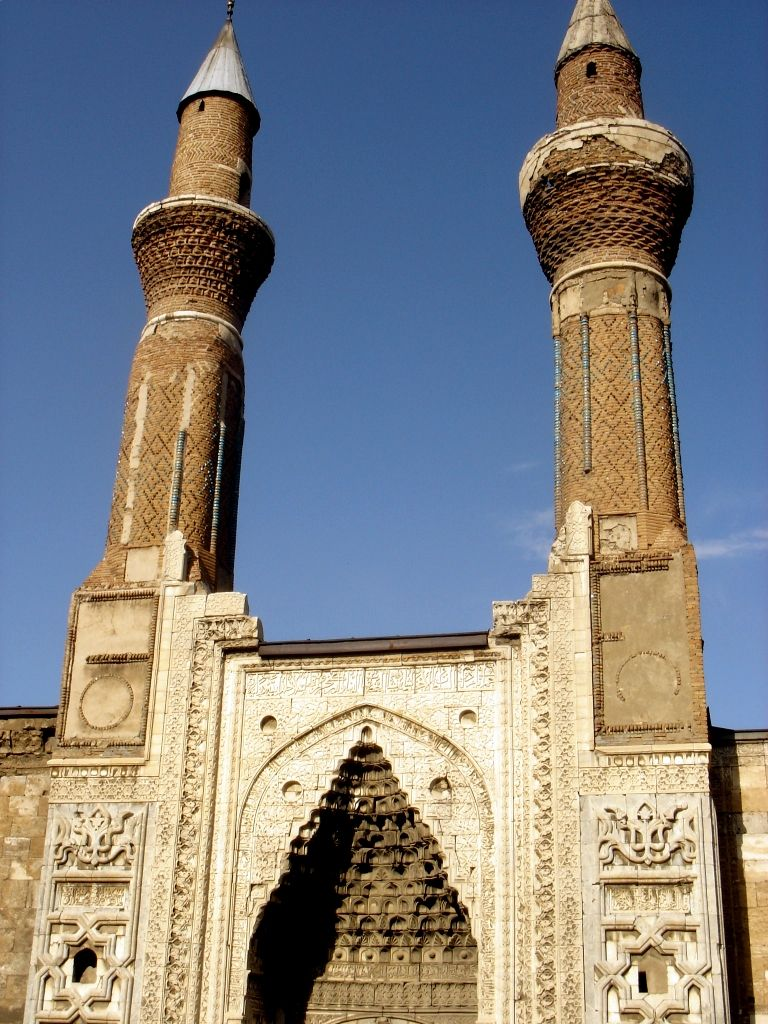
A Rûm architect from Konya built the Gök Medrese (Celestial Madrasa) of Sivas while it was a capital of the Sultanate of Rûm

The Qur'an includes Ar-Rum, the sura dealing with "the Romans", which is sometimes translated as "The Byzantines" to reflect a term that is now used in the West. The Romans of the 7th century, who are referred to as Byzantines in modern Western scholarship, were the inhabitants of the surviving Eastern Roman Empire. Since all ethnic groups in the Roman empire had been granted citizenship by 212 AD, the eastern peoples had come to label themselves Ρωμιοί or Ῥωμαῖοι (Romioi or Romaioi, Romans) by using the word for Roman citizen in the eastern lingua franca of Koine Greek. The citizenship label became روم Rūm in Arabic. To designate the inhabitants of the western city of Rome, the Arabs use instead the word رومان Rūmān or sometimes لاتينيون Lātīniyyūn (Latins), and to designate European Greek speakers, the term يونانيون Yūnāniyyūn is used (from يونان Yūnān (Ionia), the name for Greece). The word "Byzantine", which is now used by Western historians to describe the Eastern Roman Empire and its Greek lingua franca, was not used anywhere at the time.

The Roman and later Eastern Roman (Byzantine) state encompassed the entirety of the eastern Mediterranean for six centuries, but after the advent of Islam in Arabia in the 7th century and during the subsequent Islamic conquest of what is now Syria, Egypt and Libya in the 7th and the 8th centuries AD, the Byzantine state shrank to consist only of Anatolia and the Balkans in the Middle Ages. The Seljuks of the Sultanate of Rum took their name from ar-Rum, the word for the Romans in the Qu'ran. During the early Renaissance (15th century) the Byzantine state finally fell to the Muslim Turkic conquerors, who had begun migrating into what is now Turkey from Central Asia from the 12th to the 14th centuries. Thus, during the Middle Ages, the Arabs called the native inhabitants of what is now Turkey, the Balkans, Syria, Lebanon and Palestine "Rûm" (literally Romans but in modern historiography often called Byzantines), called what is now Turkey and the Balkans "the land of the Rûm" and referred to the Mediterranean as "the Sea of the Rûm".

After the fall of Constantinople in 1453, the Ottoman Turkish conqueror Sultan Mehmed II declared himself to have replaced the Byzantine (Eastern Roman) ruler as the new Kayser-i Rum, literally "Caesar of the Romans". In the Ottoman millet system, the conquered natives of Turkey and the Balkans were now categorized as the "Rum Millet" (Millet-i Rum) for taxation purposes and were allowed to continue practicing Orthodox Christianity, the religion that had been promulgated by the former Byzantine state. In modern Turkey Rum is still used to denote the Orthodox Christian native minority of Turkey, together with its pre-conquest remnant institutions such as the Rum Ortodoks Patrikhanesi, the Turkish designation of the Istanbul-based Ecumenical Patriarchate of Constantinople, the figurehead for all of Orthodox Christianity and former religious leader of the Eastern Roman state.

== In geography ==
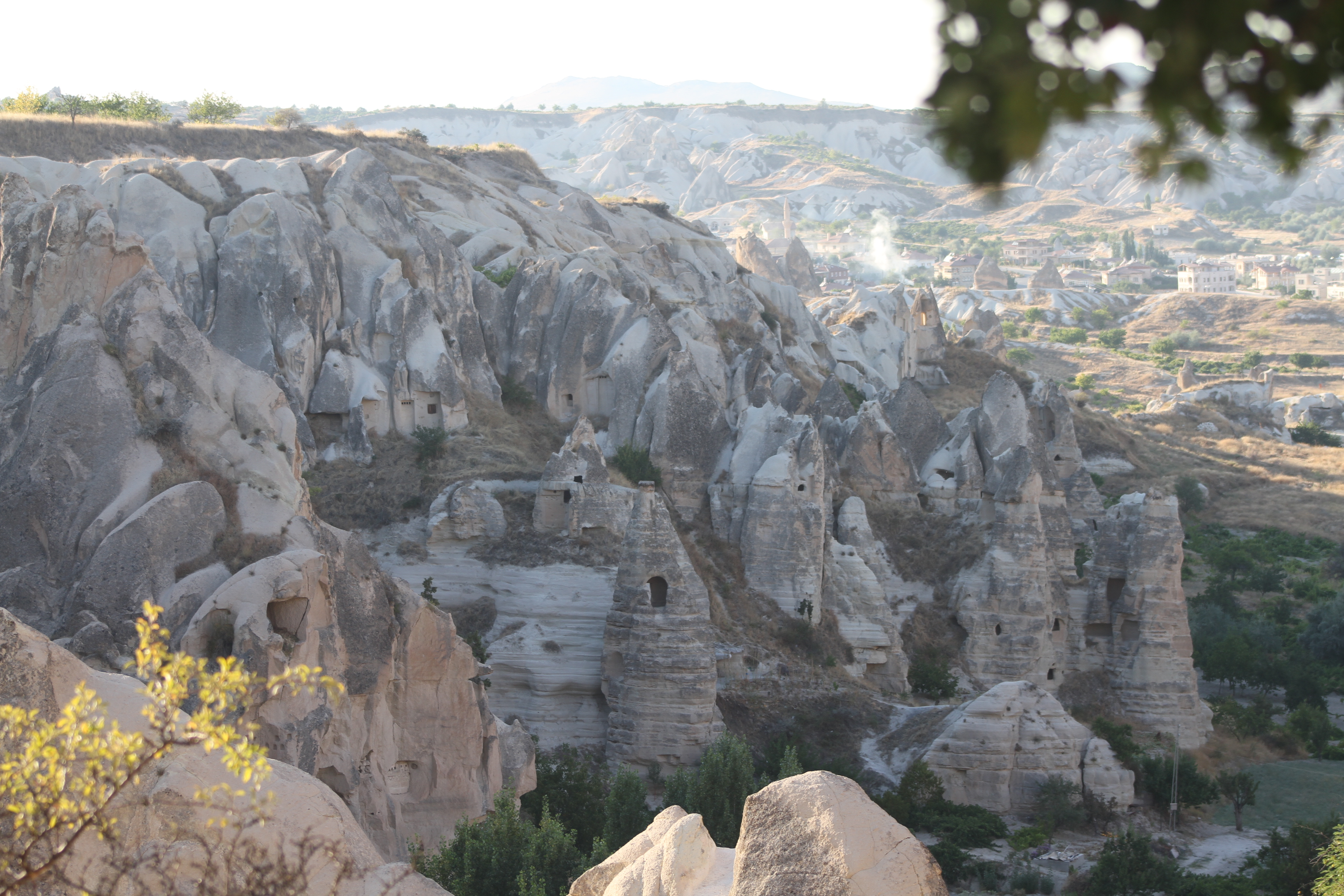
Abandoned Rûm churches carved into a solid stone cliff face, Cappadocia, Nevşehir Province, Turkey

Muslim contact with the Byzantine Empire most often took place in Asia Minor, the bulk of which is now in Turkey, since it was the heartland of the Byzantine state from the early Middle Ages onward and so the term Rûm became fixed there geographically. The term remained even after the conquest of what is now central Turkey in the late Middle Ages by Seljuk Turks, who were migrating from Central Asia. Thus, the Turks called their new state the Sultanate of Rûm, the "Sultanate of the Rome."

After the Ottoman conquest of the Balkans, the area was called Rumelia (Roman lands) as it was predominantly inhabited by the newly conquered-nation, which the Ottomans called Rûm.

== As a name ==
Al-Rūmī is a nisbah that designates people originating in the Eastern Roman Empire or lands that formerly belonged to it, especially those that are now called Turkey. Historical people so designated include the following:

- Suhayb ar-Rumi, a companion of Prophet Muhammad
- Harithah bint al-Muammil (Zunairah al-Rumiya), a companion of Prophet Muhammad
- Rumi a moniker for Mawlānā Jalāl-ad-Dīn Muhammad Balkhī, the 13th-century Persian Sufi poet who lived most of his life amongst the conquered Rûm (Byzantines) of Konya (Byzantine Greek: Ἰκόνιον or Ikonio) in the Sultanate of Rûm
- Qāḍī Zāda al-Rūmī, 14th-century mathematician

The Greek surname Roumeliotis stems from the word Rûm borrowed by Ottomans. "Roumeliotis" (or Romeliotes) refers to the inhabitants of Rumelia (Rumeli), which was the name given to the Ottoman Empire's European territories.

== Other uses ==
During the 16th century, the Portuguese used rume and rumes (plural) as a generic term to refer to the Mamluk-Ottoman forces that they faced in the Indian Ocean.

The term Urums, also derived from the same origin, is still used in contemporary ethnography to denote Turkic-speaking Greek populations. "Rumeika" is a Greek dialect identified mainly with the Ottoman Greeks.

The Chinese during the Ming dynasty referred to the Ottomans as Lumi (魯迷), derived from Rum or Rumi. The Chinese also referred to Rum as Wulumu 務魯木 during the Qing dynasty. The modern Mandarin Chinese name for the city of Rome is Luoma (羅馬).

Among the Muslim aristocracy of South Asia, the fez is known as the Rumi Topi (which means "hat of Rome or Byzantium").

Non-Ottoman Muslims in the classical period called the Ottomans Rumis because of the Byzantine legacy that was inherited by the Ottoman Empire.

In the Sassanian period (pre-Islamic Persia), the word Hrōmāy-īg (Middle Persian) meant "Roman" or "Byzantine" and was derived from the Byzantine Greek word Rhomaioi.

The Latin alphabet used for Malay is endonymically called tulisan Rumi (lit. 'Roman writing').

== See also ==
- Ayrums, a Turkic tribe that derives its name from Rûm
- Baciyan-i Rum
- Edirne Ciğeri, a meat dish found in Turkey also referred to as "Rumeli Ciğeri"
- Erzurum, from the Turkish pronunciation of the Arabic أرض روم arḍ Rūm or أرض الروم arḍ ar-Rūm, 'Land of the Romans'
- Hayhurum, Greek Orthodox Armenians of Turkey
- Kayser-i Rûm ("Caesar of Rome"), a title adopted by the Ottoman sultans to legitimize their claim as the true successors of the Roman Empire by right of conquest
- Romaniote Jews
- Rumçi, another term used to refer to the Greek Orthodox during the Ottoman Empire
- Rumelia, from the Turkish Rum eli, meaning 'country of the Romans'
- Rûm Eyalet
- Rum millet
- Rumi calendar, a calendar based on the Roman Julian calendar, which was used by the Ottoman Empire after Tanzimat
- Rumiye-i Suğra, or Little Rûm (Rome), the name of the region in Ottoman Empire that included Tokat, Amasya and Sivas
- Urums, a Turkophone Hellenic people
