= Haig Tiriakian =

Armenian politician (1871–1915)

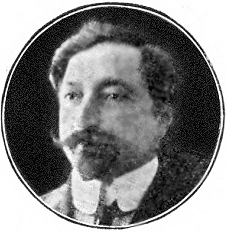
Haig (Hrach) Tiriakian

Haig (Hrach) Tiriakian (1871–1915) was an Ottoman Armenian politician and a member of the Armenian National Assembly. Tiriakian played an important role during the Ottoman Bank takeover in 1896. A member of the Armenian Revolutionary Federation, Tiriakian lead an active life in Armenian politic affairs. He was killed during the Armenian genocide in 1915.

== Life ==
Occupation of the Ottoman Bank

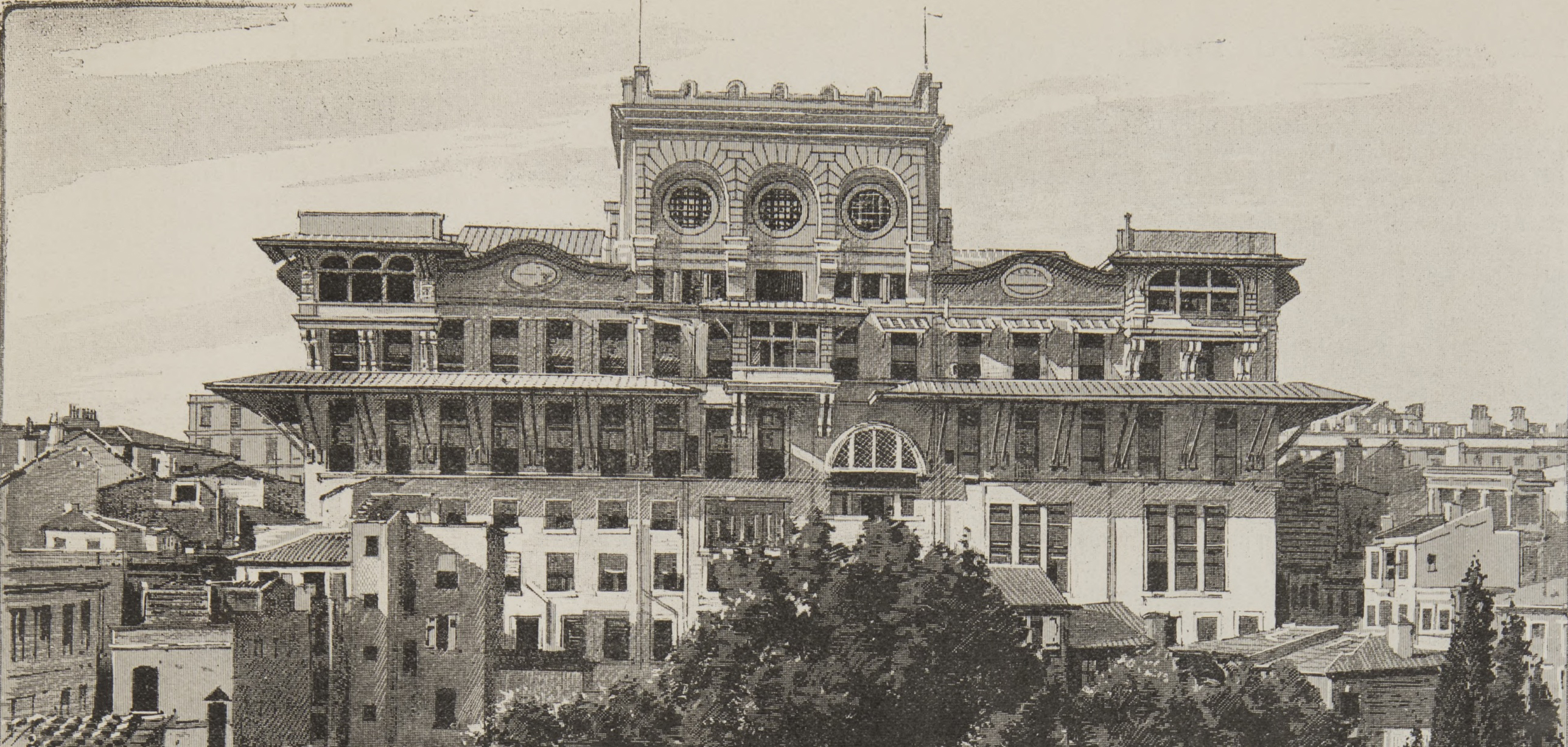
The Ottoman Bank in the late 19th century

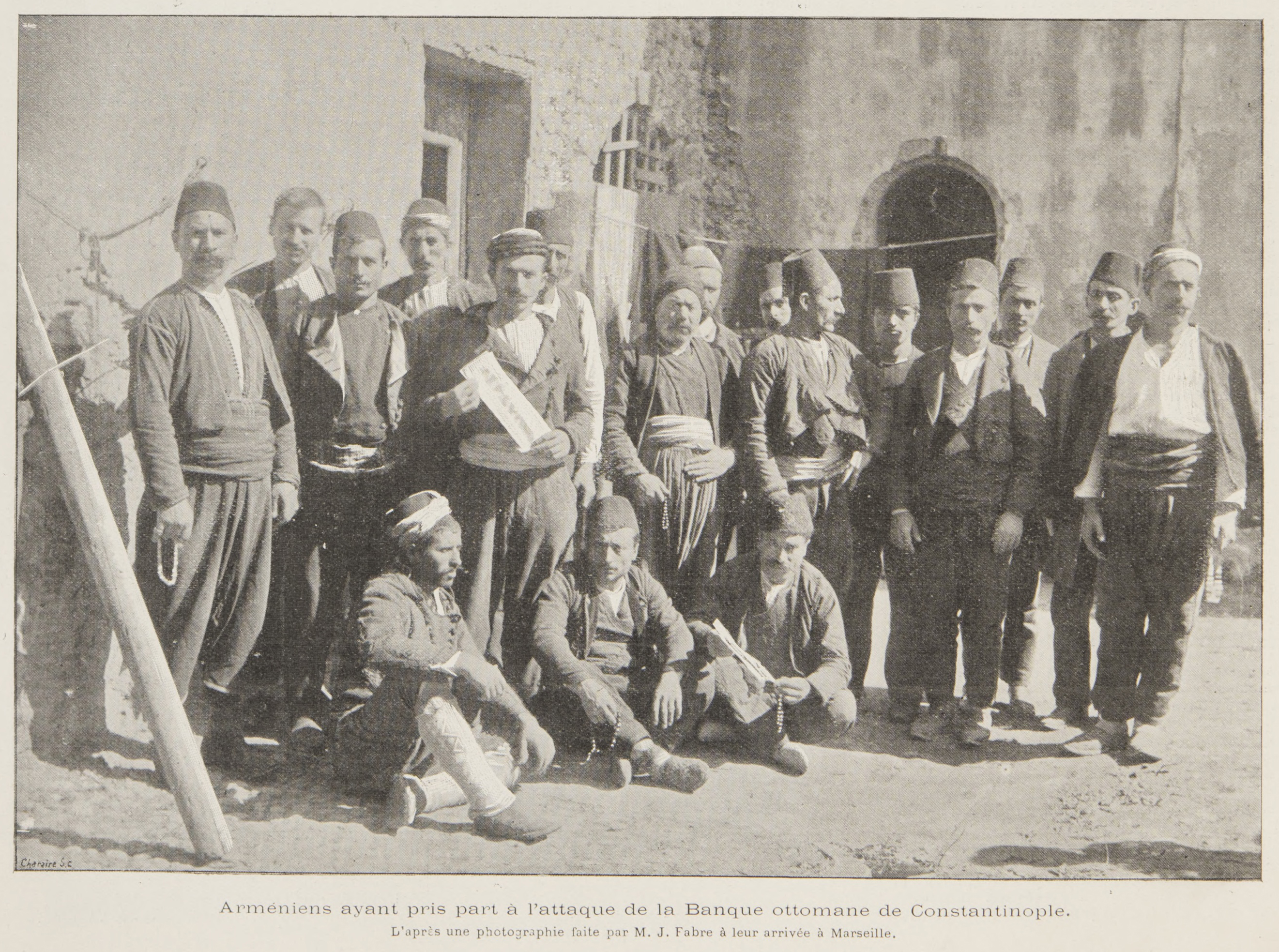
Tiriakian was one of the group of men who were exiled to Marseille, France after the takeover

Of Armenian descent, Haig (Hrach) Tiriakian was born in Trabzon, Ottoman Empire in 1871. In 1893, Tiriakian then went to Nancy, France where he studied agriculture until 1896. During his time in Europe, Tiriakian joined the Armenian Revolutionary Federation where his first assignment was assigned the planning of the Ottoman Bank takeover.

The takeover was planned in order to raise further awareness and action by the major European powers. The bank was largely employed European personnel from Great Britain and France. Stirred by the inaction of the European powers in regards to Hamidian massacres, the Armenian Revolutionary Federation members saw its seizure as the best way to bring full attention to the massacres. The organizational planning of the takeover required Tiriakian to visit various countries around the world before the takeover took place. Tiriakian eventually took part in the seizure along with other Armenian political activists such as Armen Garo and Papken Siuni. Tiriakian describes the event as follows:

6 people were sufficient to begin the operation. We set out, with sack[s] full of bombs on our shoulders and guns in our hands. The bombs were giving incredible results; they did not kill [the staff] instantly, but tore their flesh apart, and made them writhe with pain and agony. We went with Garo to the president's office and wrote down our conditions. We demanded that the Powers [European countries] fulfill our requests, that those who took part in this confrontation be freed; if not, we would blow up the bank along with ourselves. 3 had died, 6 of our friends were wounded. Our enemies' casualties were also heavy.

After the takeover concluded, Tiriakian was one of many participants who were exiled then shipped to Marseille, France. While in exile, Tiriakian attended the Second General Congress of the Armenian Revolutionary Federation held in 1898 in Tbilisi, Georgia which had him appointed the Responsible Body for the Cilicia region. After making a brief visit to Alexandria, Egypt, Tiriakian returned to the Ottoman Empire in secret. One of the main goals of his return was to gather money from wealthy Armenians in order to help fund the Armenian revolutionary movement. However, since the Ottoman authorities had an arrest warrant for him, he was caught and sent to life imprisonment in Bodrum. After the Young Turk Revolution in 1908, Tiriakian was set free and returned to Constantinople. In Constantinople, he became a publicist and manager of the Azadamard Armenian newspaper.

== Death ==
Haig Tiriakian was arrested as part of the deportation of Armenian notables on 24 April 1915 during the Armenian genocide. He was deported to Ayaş, a village in the interior of the Ottoman Empire. After learning that another Haig Tiriakian had been detained in Ayaş, he demanded his namesake's release and his own transfer from Çankırı to Ayaş. He was then tortured and eventually killed in the vicinity of Ankara.
