= Çaldere =

Çaldere can refer to:

- Çaldere, Kemaliye
- Çaldere, Silvan
