= Esertepe =

Esertepe can refer to:

- Esertepe, Kemaliye
- Esertepe Park
