= Ocak, Kemaliye =

Village in Turkey

Ocak
- Village
- Location in Turkey
- Coordinates: 39.146°N 38.594°E
- Country: Turkey
- Province: Erzincan
- District: Kemaliye
- Population (2022): 55
- Time zone: UTC+3 (TRT)

Ocak is a village in the Kemaliye District of Erzincan Province in Turkey. Its population is 55 (2022).
