= Dolunay, Kemaliye =

Village in Turkey

Dolunay
- Village
- Location in Turkey
- Coordinates: 39.234°N 38.596°E
- Country: Turkey
- Province: Erzincan
- District: Kemaliye
- Population (2022): 12
- Time zone: UTC+3 (TRT)

Dolunay is a village in the Kemaliye District of Erzincan Province in Turkey. Its population is 12 (2022).
