= Yukarıumutlu, Kemaliye =

Village in Turkey

Yukarıumutlu
- Village
- Location in Turkey
- Coordinates: 39.244°N 38.880°E
- Country: Turkey
- Province: Erzincan
- District: Kemaliye
- Population (2022): 38
- Time zone: UTC+3 (TRT)

Yukarıumutlu is a village in the Kemaliye District of Erzincan Province in Turkey. Its population is 38 (2022).
