= Adak, Kemaliye =

Village in Turkey

Adak
- Village
- Location in Turkey
- Coordinates: 39°07′19″N 38°39′15″E
- Country: Turkey
- Province: Erzincan
- District: Kemaliye
- Population (2022): 36
- Time zone: UTC+3 (TRT)

Adak is a village in the Kemaliye District of Erzincan Province in Turkey. Its population is 36 (2022).
