= Salihli, Kemaliye =

Village in Turkey

Salihli
- Village
- Location in Turkey
- Coordinates: 39.333°N 38.504°E
- Country: Turkey
- Province: Erzincan
- District: Kemaliye
- Population (2022): 31
- Time zone: UTC+3 (TRT)

Salihli is a village in the Kemaliye District of Erzincan Province in Turkey. Its population is 31 (2022).
