= Kabataş, Kemaliye =

Village in Turkey

Kabataş
- Village
- Location in Turkey
- Coordinates: 39.346°N 38.590°E
- Country: Turkey
- Province: Erzincan
- District: Kemaliye
- Population (2022): 44
- Time zone: UTC+3 (TRT)

Kabataş is a village in the Kemaliye District of Erzincan Province in Turkey. Its population is 44 (2022).
