= Dilli, Kemaliye =

Village in Turkey

Dilli
- Village
- Location in Turkey
- Coordinates: 39°16′N 38°24′E
- Country: Turkey
- Province: Erzincan
- District: Kemaliye
- Population (2022): 34
- Time zone: UTC+3 (TRT)

Dilli is a village in the Kemaliye District of Erzincan Province in Turkey. Its population is 34 (2022).
