= Kuşak, Kemaliye =

Village in Turkey

Kuşak
- Village
- Location in Turkey
- Coordinates: 39.147°N 38.523°E
- Country: Turkey
- Province: Erzincan
- District: Kemaliye
- Population (2022): 73
- Time zone: UTC+3 (TRT)

Kuşak is a village in the Kemaliye District of Erzincan Province in Turkey. Its population is 73 (2022).
