= Ahmet Cömert =

Turkish boxer

Personal information
- Nationality: Turkish
- Born: 1926 Kemaliye, Erzincan, Turkey
- Died: 1990 (aged 63–64) Czechoslovakia

Boxing career

Ahmet Cömert (1926–1990) was a Turkish amateur boxer, coach, referee, judge and sports official. He served in the executive committee of the International Boxing Association (AIBA).

He was born in Kemaliye town of Erzincan Province in 1926. Between 1939 and 1944, Ahmet Cömert performed amateur boxing. After retiring from active sport, he became a boxing coach at Galatasaray S.K. The boxing team he coached achieved four consecutive times champion titles.

In the early 1950s, he participated at the Korean War as a member of the Turkish Brigade. Returned home, he successfully served as boxing referee in nine European and four World championships and two Olympic Games. He was awarded with a golden pin by the AIBA for his officiating 39 boxing fights with 100% accuracy during the 1972 Summer Olympics in Munich, Germany, an honor, which a boxing referee received for the first time ever.

In 1978, Ahmet Cömert was appointed to the executive board and referee committee of the AIBA. He was elected vice president of the Amateur Boxing Federation of Islamic Countries. He served as boxing judge at the Moscow, Los Angeles and Seoul Olympic Games.

Ahmet Cömert died of apparent heart failure while on duty during the 1990 European Junior Boxing Championship held in the Czechoslovakia.

== Legacy ==
- An amateur boxing tournament (Turkish: Uluslararası Ahmet Cömert Boks Turnuvası) organized annually at international level in Turkey, which is considered as the biggest competition in the world, is named after him. In 2012, its 27th edition was held.
- A sport hall (Turkish: Ahmet Cömert Spor Salonu) opened in 1998 in Ataköy neighborhood of Bakırköy district in Istanbul bears his name.
