= Ağıl, Kemaliye =

Village in Turkey

Ağıl
- Village
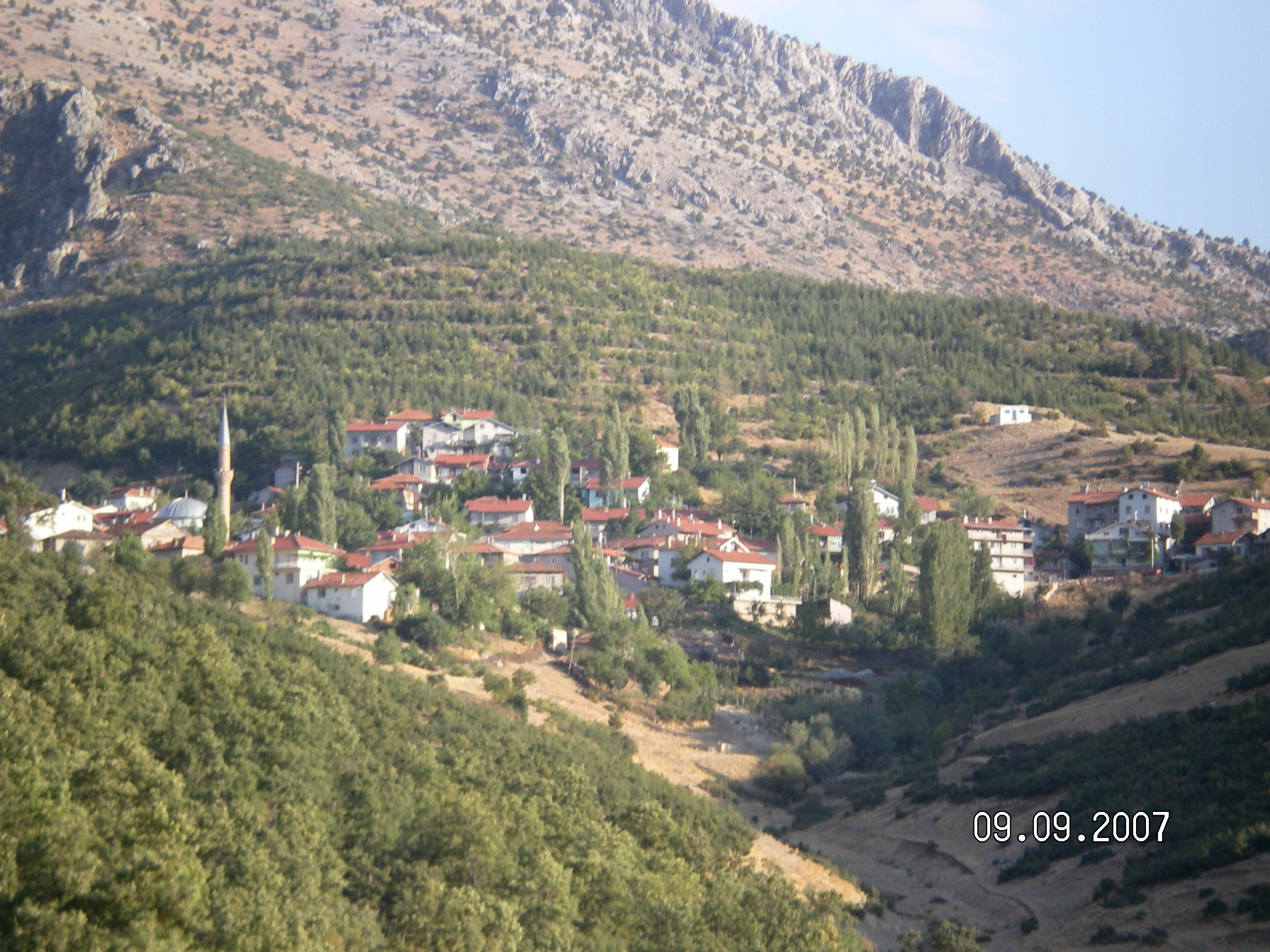

- Location within Turkey
- Coordinates: 39.2456°N 38.3781°E
- Country: Turkey
- Province: Erzincan
- District: Kemaliye
- Population (2022): 19
- Time zone: UTC+3 (TRT)

Ağıl (also: Ağılköy) is a village in the Kemaliye District of Erzincan Province in Turkey. Its population is 19 (2022).
