= Çakırtaş, Kemaliye =

Village in Turkey

Çakırtaş
- Village
- Location in Turkey
- Coordinates: 39.0675°N 38.7216°E
- Country: Turkey
- Province: Erzincan
- District: Kemaliye
- Population (2022): 58
- Time zone: UTC+3 (TRT)

Çakırtaş is a village in the Kemaliye District of Erzincan Province in Turkey. Its population is 58 (2022).
