= Avcı, Kemaliye =

Village in Turkey

Avcı
- Village
- Location in Turkey
- Coordinates: 39.2320°N 38.8001°E
- Country: Turkey
- Province: Erzincan
- District: Kemaliye
- Population (2022): 39
- Time zone: UTC+3 (TRT)

Avcı is a village in the Kemaliye District of Erzincan Province in Turkey. Its population is 39 as of 2022.
