= Balkırı, Kemaliye =

Village in Turkey

Balkırı
- Village
- Location in Turkey
- Coordinates: 39.2510°N 38.7937°E
- Country: Turkey
- Province: Erzincan
- District: Kemaliye
- Population (2022): 38
- Time zone: UTC+3 (TRT)

Balkırı is a village in the Kemaliye District of Erzincan Province in Turkey. Its population is 38 (2022).
