= Çanakçı, Kemaliye =

Village in Turkey

Çanakçı
- Village
- Location in Turkey
- Coordinates: 39.1186°N 38.3788°E
- Country: Turkey
- Province: Erzincan
- District: Kemaliye
- Population (2022): 94
- Time zone: UTC+3 (TRT)

Çanakçı is a village in the Kemaliye District of Erzincan Province in Turkey. Its population is 94 (2022).
