= Keklikpınarı, Kemaliye =

Village in Turkey

Keklikpınarı
- Village
- Location in Turkey
- Coordinates: 39.148°N 38.468°E
- Country: Turkey
- Province: Erzincan
- District: Kemaliye
- Population (2022): 65
- Time zone: UTC+3 (TRT)

Keklikpınarı is a village in the Kemaliye District of Erzincan Province in Turkey. Its population is 65 (2022).
