= Apçağa, Kemaliye =

Village in Turkey

Apçağa
- Village
- Location in Turkey
- Coordinates: 39°14′N 38°30′E
- Country: Turkey
- Province: Erzincan
- District: Kemaliye
- Population (2022): 170
- Time zone: UTC+3 (TRT)

Apçağa is a village in the Kemaliye District of Erzincan Province in Turkey. Its population is 170 (2022).
