= Yazmakaya, Kemaliye =

Village in Turkey

Yazmakaya
- Village
- Location in Turkey
- Coordinates: 39°03′N 38°42′E
- Country: Turkey
- Province: Erzincan
- District: Kemaliye
- Population (2022): 21
- Time zone: UTC+3 (TRT)

Yazmakaya is a village in the Kemaliye District of Erzincan Province in Turkey. Its population is 21 (2022).
