= Baciyan-i Rum =

Female militia organization

Bacıyân-ı Rûm (literally Sisters of Rûm) was a Turkish women’s militia organization during the late Anatolian Beylik period.

== Origins ==
The term bâciyân-ı Rûm was first time mentioned in the 15th century by Aşıkpaşazade, alongside other groups called gāziyân-ı Rûm (Ghazis of Rum), ahîyân-ı Rûm (Akhis of Rum) and abdalân-ı Rûm (Abdals of Rum). Another record appears in Bertrandon de la Broquière's travelogue. La Broquière mentioned that the Beylik of Dulkadir had a Turkoman militia consisting of women.

Bacıyân-ı Rûm was a Turkic female militia. Organized militias of female warriors are characteristic of many Iranian and Turkic semi-nomadic groups, such as the Scythians, Sarmatians, Bulgars, Pechenegs, Cumans and others. In the Islamic tradition, Sufism had a decisive influence on its formation, adopting the tradition of female warriors from earlier pagan times. The organization began to decline in the 14th - 15th centuries with the rise of the Ottoman Beylik, which conquered the remaining principalities in Asia Minor. However, female warriors from the Baciyan-i Rum were probably participated in the Ottoman conquest of the Balkans during the 14th - 15th centuries. Similar women's military organizations were also existed in Volga Bulgaria in the 10th - 13th centuries.

Some conservative historians disputed organisation actually existed, and argue that, in Aşıkpaşazade's history, the word "bâciyân" (sisters) was a misspelling of another word. Franz Taeschner took this view, suggesting it might have ben hajiyân-ı Rûm (pilgrims of Rum) or bahşiyân-ı Rûm (clerks of Rum). Zeki Velidi Togan also supported this view. However, Mehmet Fuat Köprülü argued that such an organisation might have existed - female initiates into Sufi orders (such as the Bektashi) were given the title of "bacı" ("sister"), just as male initiates were given the title of "akhi (brother).

== See also ==
- Akhiya
  - Ahi Beylik
