= Şahinler, Kemaliye =

Village in Turkey

Şahinler
- Village
- Location within Turkey
- Coordinates: 39.180°N 38.730°E
- Country: Turkey
- Province: Erzincan
- District: Kemaliye
- Population (2022): 22
- Time zone: UTC+3 (TRT)

Şahinler is a village in the Kemaliye District of Erzincan Province in Turkey. The village was named "Kürtler" (meaning "Kurds") until 8 May 1957, when its name was changed to "Şahinler" as part of a broader policy of Turkification of place names. Its population is 22 (2022).
