= Adatepe, Divriği =

Village in Sivas Province, Turkey

Adatepe
- Village
- Location in Turkey Adatepe (Turkey Central Anatolia)
- Coordinates: 39.403°N 38.381°E
- Country: Turkey
- Province: Sivas
- District: Divriği
- Population (2023): 97
- Time zone: UTC+3 (TRT)

Adatepe (Kurdish: Pîngen) is a village in the Divriği District of Sivas Province in Turkey. It is populated by Kurds of the Kurmeş tribe and had a population of 97 in 2023.

== Notable people ==
- Papken Siuni
