= Efeler, Kemaliye =

Village in Turkey

Efeler
- Village
- Location in Turkey
- Coordinates: 39°7′9″N 38°33′48″E
- Country: Turkey
- Province: Erzincan
- District: Kemaliye
- Population (2022): 35
- Time zone: UTC+3 (TRT)

Efeler is a village in the Kemaliye District of Erzincan Province in Turkey. Its population is 35 (2022).
