= Aşağıumutlu, Kemaliye =

Village in Turkey

Aşağıumutlu
- Village
- Location in Turkey
- Coordinates: 39.2407°N 38.8634°E
- Country: Turkey
- Province: Erzincan
- District: Kemaliye
- Population (2022): 86
- Time zone: UTC+3 (TRT)

Aşağıumutlu is a village in the Kemaliye District of Erzincan Province in Turkey. Its population is 86 (2022).
