= Aksöğüt, Kemaliye =

Village in Turkey

Aksöğüt
- Village
- Location in Turkey
- Coordinates: 39.2070°N 38.6382°E
- Country: Turkey
- Province: Erzincan
- District: Kemaliye
- Population (2022): 20
- Time zone: UTC+3 (TRT)

Aksöğüt is a village in the Kemaliye District of Erzincan Province in Turkey. Its population is 20 (2022).
