= Başpınar, Kemaliye =

Village in Turkey

Başpınar
- Village
- Location in Turkey
- Coordinates: 39.1906°N 38.6893°E
- Country: Turkey
- Province: Erzincan
- District: Kemaliye
- Population (2022): 51
- Time zone: UTC+3 (TRT)

Başpınar is a village in the Kemaliye District of Erzincan Province in Turkey. Its population is 51 (2022).
