= Buğdaypınar, Kemaliye =

Village in Turkey

Buğdaypınar
- Village
- Location in Turkey
- Coordinates: 39°12′N 38°45′E
- Country: Turkey
- Province: Erzincan
- District: Kemaliye
- Population (2022): 76
- Time zone: UTC+3 (TRT)

Buğdaypınar is a village in the Kemaliye District of Erzincan Province in Turkey. Its population is 76 (2022).
