= Gümüşçeşme, Kemaliye =

Village in Turkey

Gümüşçeşme
- Village
- Location in Turkey
- Coordinates: 39°19′12″N 38°24′57″E
- Country: Turkey
- Province: Erzincan
- District: Kemaliye
- Population (2022): 83
- Time zone: UTC+3 (TRT)

Gümüşçeşme is a village in the Kemaliye District of Erzincan Province in Turkey. Its population is 83 (2022).
