= Yeşilyamaç, Kemaliye =

Village in Turkey

Yeşilyamaç
- Village
- Location in Turkey
- Coordinates: 39.263°N 38.547°E
- Country: Turkey
- Province: Erzincan
- District: Kemaliye
- Population (2022): 17
- Time zone: UTC+3 (TRT)

Yeşilyamaç is a village in the Kemaliye District of Erzincan Province in Turkey. Its population is 17 (2022).
