= Günyolu, Kemaliye =

Village in Turkey

Günyolu
- Village
- Location in Turkey
- Coordinates: 39.214°N 38.687°E
- Country: Turkey
- Province: Erzincan
- District: Kemaliye
- Population (2022): 12
- Time zone: UTC+3 (TRT)

Günyolu is a village in the Kemaliye District of Erzincan Province in Turkey. Its population is 12 (2022).
