= Armen Garo =

Armenian activist and politician (1872–1923)

Armen Karo
- Արմէն Գարօ
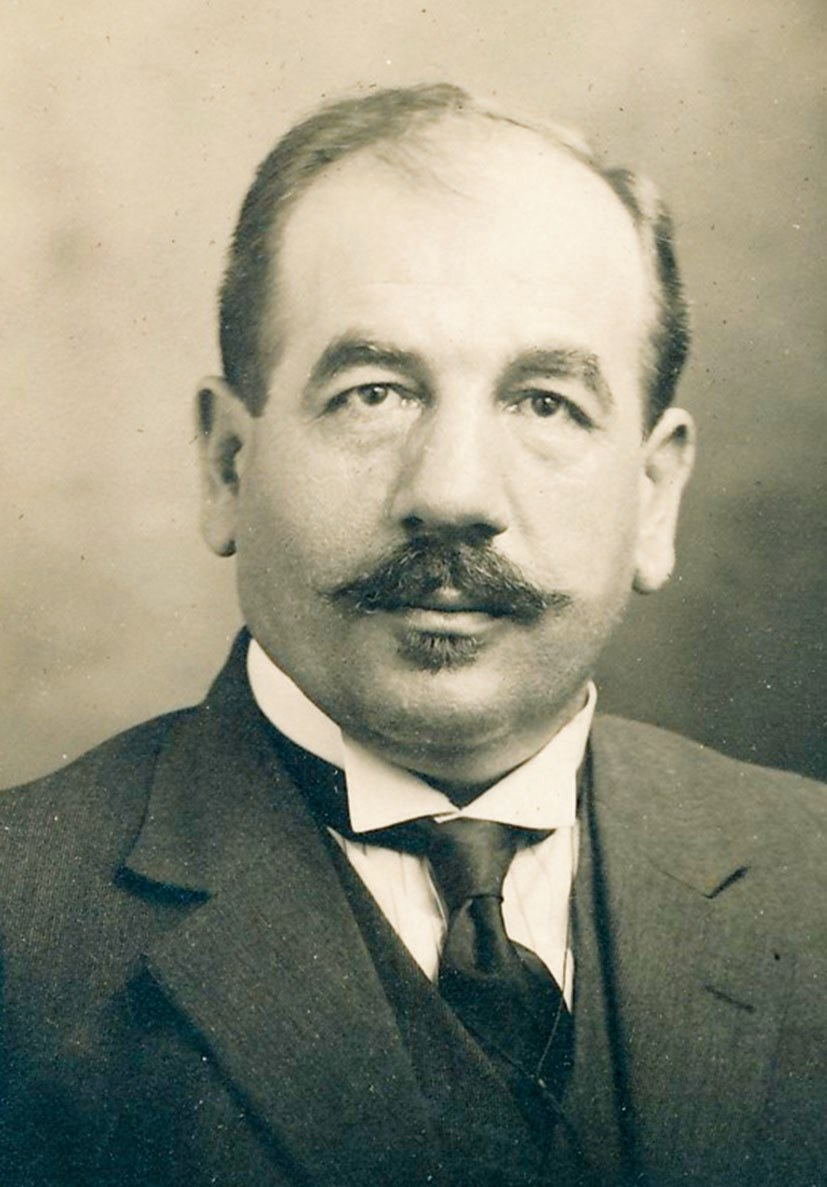

Ambassador of Armenia to the United States
- In office 1918–1920
- Preceded by: position established
- Succeeded by: position abolished

Member of the Ottoman Parliament
- In office 1908–1912

Personal details
- Born: Karekin Pastermadjian; 9 February 1872 Erzurum, Erzurum Vilayet, Ottoman Empire
- Died: 23 March 1923 (aged 51) Geneva, Switzerland
- Party: Armenian Revolutionary Federation
- Education: Sanasarian College; Agricultural School of Nancy-Université
- Occupation: Agriculturalist

Military service
- Allegiance: Dashnaktsutyun (from 1895); Russian Empire (1914–1916); Republic of Armenia (1918–1920)
- Years of service: 1895—1917
- Commands: 2nd Battalion Volunteer Corps
- Battles/wars: Armenian National Liberation Movement; Zeitun Rebellion; Armenian–Tatar War; World War I; Caucasus Campaign

Garegin or Karekin Pastermadjian (Armenian: Գարեգին Փաստրմաճեան), better known by his nom de guerre Armen Garo or Armen Karo (Արմէն Գարօ; 9 February 1872 – 23 March 1923) was an Armenian activist and politician. Armen Karo was a leading member of the Armenian Revolutionary Federation for more than two decades. He was one of the masterminds of the 1896 occupation of the Ottoman Bank in response to the Hamidian massacres, and of Operation Nemesis, in which several perpetrators of the Armenian genocide were assassinated. Between 1918 and 1920 he served as the first ambassador to the United States from the First Republic of Armenia.

== Biography ==
=== Early life ===
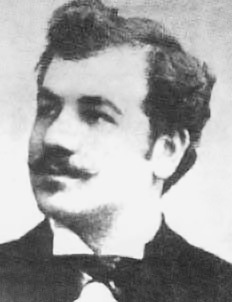
Armen Garo in his youth

Karekin Pastermadjian was born in Erzurum. He finished his elementary education as one of the first graduates of the Sanasarian College of Erzurum. in 1891. Later in 1894, he continued his studies in France to study agriculture at the Agricultural School of Nancy-Université. During this period he became one of several Armenian students in Europe to join the Armenian Revolutionary Federation (ARF).

=== 1895 Zeitun Resistance ===
His plans to return to his hometown after graduating came to a halt when massacres and conflict began in Zeitun. He left his studies to aid his compatriots in Zeitun. He soon found himself in Geneva, where he became an activist alongside his friends. He was sent to Egypt to assist the Zeitun Resistance. With Sarkis Srentz, Haig Tiriakian (who assumed the name Hratch), and Max Zevrouz, he left Egypt and returned to the Ottoman Empire to participate in the efforts of the ARF. It was around this time that Karekin Pastermadjian first assumed the name Armen Garo.

=== Ottoman Bank Takeover ===
The 1896 Ottoman Bank Takeover, executed on 26 August 1896, was his and Papken Siuni's brainchild. The attack took place at about 1 p.m. Garo entered 10 minutes prior to the attack. He was to keep the teller busy and the bank officers from escaping. His men didn't arrive quickly so he went to a coffee shop across the street. When he saw the men through the doorway, he ran out to meet them. During the long and bloody battle, the group leader, Papken Siuni, was killed. Garo took over as leader, ordering his group for much of the standoff.

=== Graduate studies, 1897-1900 ===
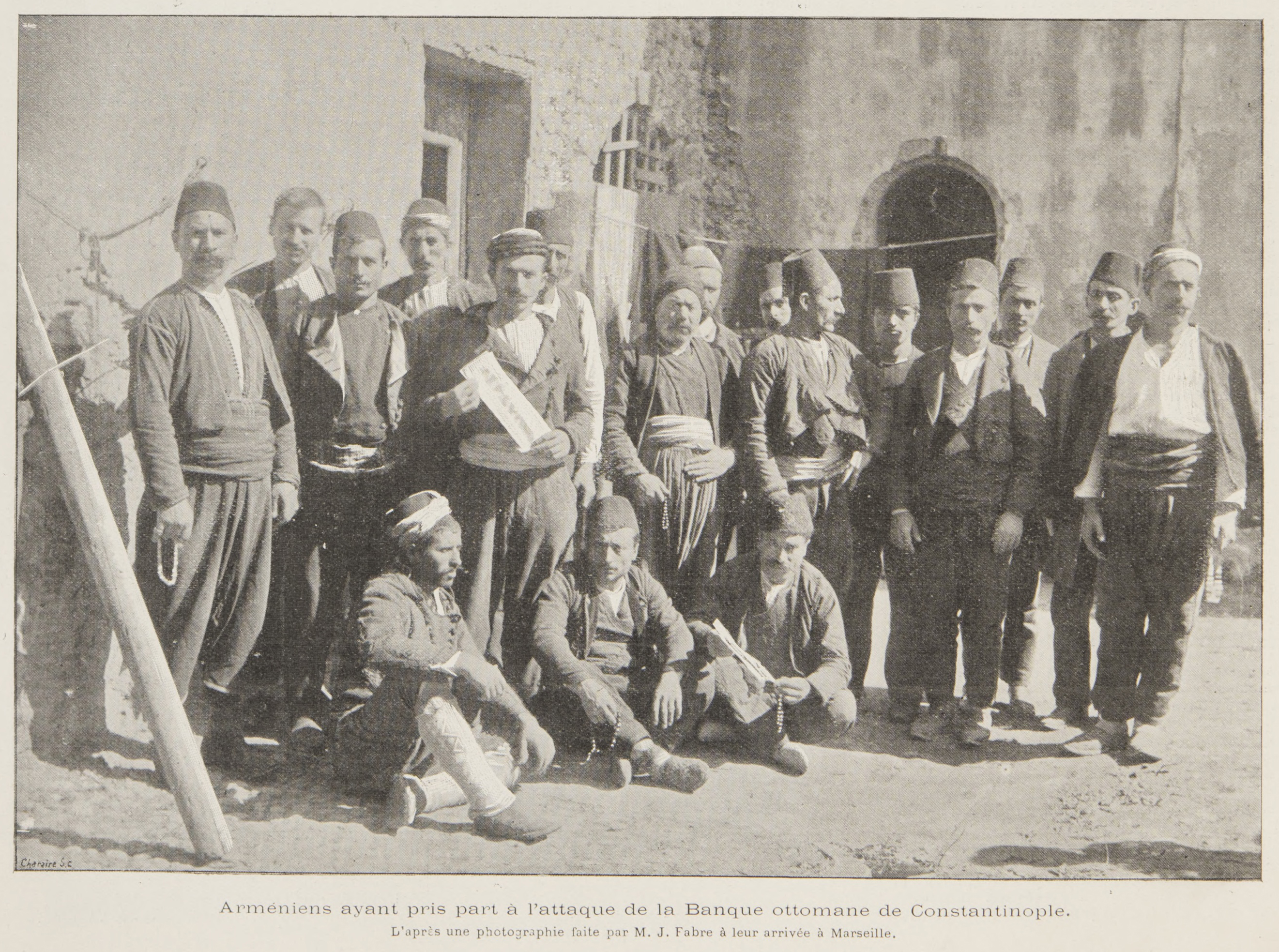
Individuals who participated in the takeover of the Ottoman Bank seen here in a group photo taken in Marseille

After these events, Karekin Pastermadjian returned to Europe to continue his unfinished studies. French Foreign Minister Gabriel Hanotaux declared the Armenians who had been connected with the Ottoman Bank Takeover as persona non grata and denied their stay in France. Armen Garo transferred to Switzerland and studied natural sciences at the University of Geneva.

During his studies, he continued his activities with the Armenian Revolutionary Federation. He was on the delegate roster of the second ARF general conference in 1898, representing the party committee in Egypt. Despite his youth, he had gained trust and authority in the leading circles of the Armenian Revolutionary Federation. In 1900 he completed his courses at the University of Geneva and received a doctoral degree in physical chemistry. In 1901 he founded a lab in Tiflis for chemical research.

=== Armenian-Tatar massacres, 1905-1907 ===
During the Armenian–Tatar massacres of 1905–1906 the ARF was involved in armed activities. Pastermadjian organized the self-defense of the Armenians in Tiflis. He and five hundred volunteers succeeded in securing peace in the capital of Transcaucasia.

=== Deputy from Erzurum 1908-1912 ===
The situation in the Caucasus came back almost to normal. Pastermadjian was able to create a fairly prosperous life for himself. He secured the right to develop a copper mine, and worked towards a partnership with a large company. His business required that he should stay in the Caucasus to continue his successful enterprise.

When the Young Turk Revolution occurred in 1908, the Armenians in Erzurum, as well as the ARF, telegraphed Pastermadjian and asked him to become their candidate in the coming elections for Representative to the Ottoman Parliament. He became a member of the Ottoman parliament part from the Armenian Revolutionary Federation deputies. Pastermadjian was a deputy from Erzurum for 2 terms. He was a member of the Ottoman Parliament from 1908 to 5 August 1912. His document of election (tr: mazbata) is found in the library of the Grand National Assembly of Türkiye. During his four years in Constantinople (Istanbul) as a deputy, he worked for the railroad bill which was known to the public as Chester's bill. Its main objective was to build railroads as soon as possible in those vilayets which were considered to be Russia's future possessions. For that reason neither France nor Germany wished to undertake it, lest they should arouse the enmity of Russia. Another fundamental object was to build those lines with American capital, which would make it possible to counteract the Russo-Franco-German policies and financial intrigues. But in spite of all efforts unable to overcome the German, opposition in Constantinople, although, as the outcome of the struggle in connection with that bill, two ministers of public works were forced to resign their post.

Talaat, on behalf of the "Committee of Union and Progress", offered the portfolio of public works, refused these proposals, for the simple reason that he did not wish to compromise in any way with the leaders of the government.

He had taken too active a part in 1913 in the conferences held for the consideration of the Armenian reforms, and especially because, while parliamentary elections were going on during April 1914, he was in Paris and the Netherlands, as the delegate of the Armenian Revolutionary Federation, to meet the inspectors general who were invited to carry out the reforms.

=== World War I ===
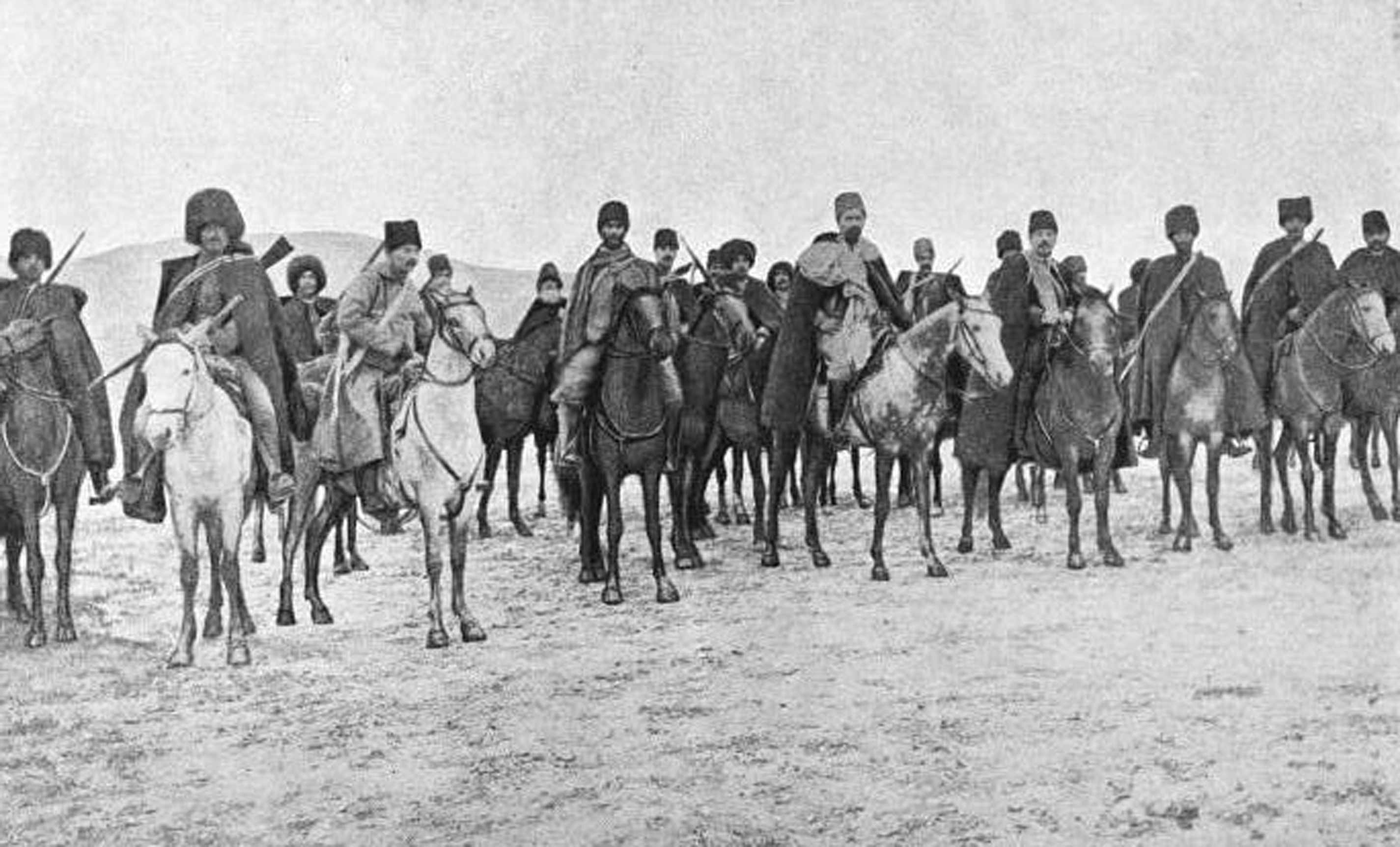
The staff of Armenian volunteers of the 2nd Armenian Volunteer Battalion in November 1914. Khetcho, Drastamat Kanayan, and Karekin Pastermadjian are among those pictured

During the autumn of 1914, a month and a half before the beginning hostilities, Garo went to the Caucasus on a special mission given after the Armenian congress at Erzurum, and joined the committee which had been appointed by the Armenian National Council of the Caucasus to organize the Armenian volunteer units. In November 1914, he accompanied the 2nd Armenian Volunteer Battalion as the representative of the executive committee of Tiflis.

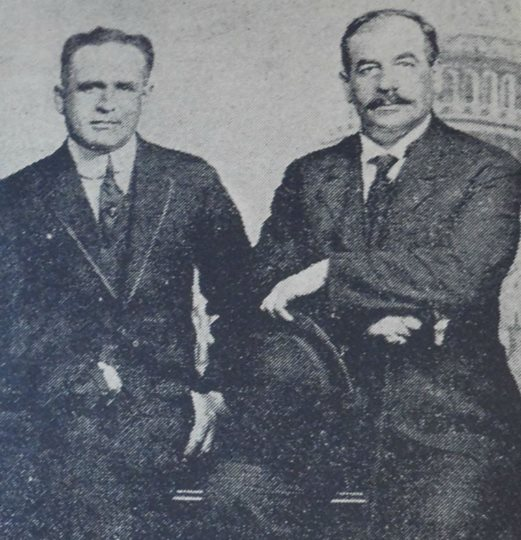
Armen Garo seen here with Vahan Kardashian.

On 14 November, at the time of the Bergmann Offensive, the 2nd Battalion engaged in battle for the first time, near Bayazid. In the course of a bloody combat which lasted twenty-four hours, Dro, the commander of the battalion, was seriously wounded, and Garo was forced to immediately take his place.

From that day until March of the following year, he remained at the head of that battalion, and led it into eleven battles in the neighborhood of Alashkert, Toutakh, and Malashkert, until Dro recovered and returned to resume the command. In the summer of 1915, he went to Van during the Defense of Van, becoming one of the first to enter the city after the Russians had liberated it.

Khetcho (Catchik), his assistant, died on the shores of Lake Van in July 1915.

In the spring of 1917, when the Russian Revolution turned the Caucasus upside down, Armen Garo and Dr. Hakob Zavriev were sent from the Caucasus to Petrograd to negotiate with the Russian provisional government concerning Caucasian affairs.

He left for America in June 1917 as the representative of the Armenian National Council of Tiflis. He was elected to be ambassador of the First Republic of Armenia to the United States in Washington, D.C.

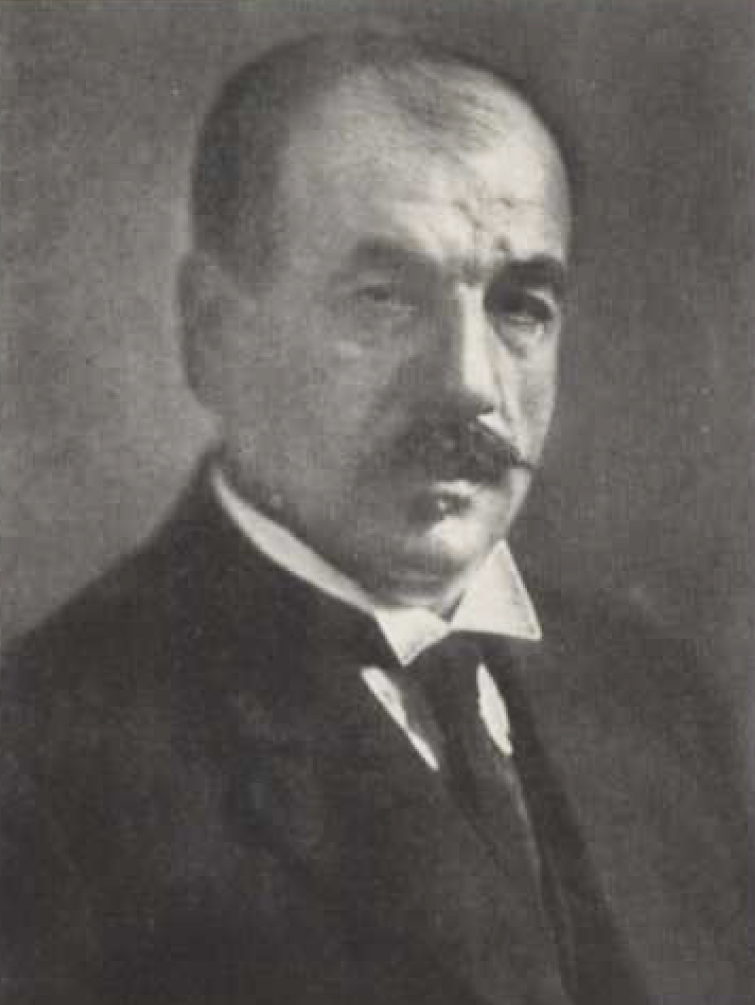
Armen Garo during the last years of his life

== Death and legacy ==
When the 1915 Armenian genocide broke out, Armen Garo became very depressed and sick. When Armenia lost its independence, his sickness grew worse. He died of heart disease in Geneva, Switzerland on 23 March 1923, aged 51, where he was attending a conference on Russia.

There are several organizations with chapters named after him, including the Armenian Youth Federation "Armen Garo" Chapter of Racine, Wisconsin, and the "Armen Karo" Armenian Revolutionary Federation Student Association of Canada.

== Selected works ==
- Why Armenia should be free: Armenia's rôle in the present war... (1918)
- Armenia and Her Claims to Freedom and National Independence (1919)
- Armenia a Leading Factor in the Winning of the War (1919)
- Apruats ōrer Ապրուած օրեր [Lived days] (in Armenian). Boston: Hairenik. 1948. Memoirs (read online).
