= Yayladamı, Kemaliye =

Village in Turkey

Yayladamı
- Village
- Location in Turkey
- Coordinates: 39.272°N 38.612°E
- Country: Turkey
- Province: Erzincan
- District: Kemaliye
- Population (2022): 8
- Time zone: UTC+3 (TRT)

Yayladamı is a village in the Kemaliye District of Erzincan Province in Turkey. Its population is 8 (2022).
