= Demir, Kemaliye =

Village in Turkey

Demir
- Village
- Location in Turkey
- Coordinates: 39°4′13″N 38°39′18″E
- Country: Turkey
- Province: Erzincan
- District: Kemaliye
- Population (2022): 23
- Time zone: UTC+3 (TRT)

Demir is a village in the Kemaliye District of Erzincan Province in Turkey. Its population is 23 (2022).
