= Akçalı, Kemaliye =

Village in Turkey

Akçalı
- Village
- Location in Turkey
- Coordinates: 39.1192°N 38.6673°E
- Country: Turkey
- Province: Erzincan
- District: Kemaliye
- Population (2022): 27
- Time zone: UTC+3 (TRT)

Akçalı is a village in the Kemaliye District of Erzincan Province in Turkey. Its population is 27 (2022).
