= Dutluca, Kemaliye =

Village in Turkey

Dutluca
- Village
- Location in Turkey
- Coordinates: 39°8′7″N 38°36′44″E
- Country: Turkey
- Province: Erzincan
- District: Kemaliye
- Population (2022): 115
- Time zone: UTC+3 (TRT)

Dutluca is a village in the Kemaliye District of Erzincan Province in Turkey. Its population is 115 (2022).
