= Armağan, Kemaliye =

Village in Turkey

Armağan
- Village
- Location in Turkey
- Coordinates: 39.2200°N 38.7576°E
- Country: Turkey
- Province: Erzincan
- District: Kemaliye
- Population (2022): 27
- Time zone: UTC+3 (TRT)

Armağan is a village in the Kemaliye District of Erzincan Province in Turkey. Its population is 27 (2022).
