= Occupation of the Ottoman Bank =

Occupation of the Ottoman Bank in Istanbul by members of the Armenian Revolutionary Federation

1896 Ottoman Bank takeover
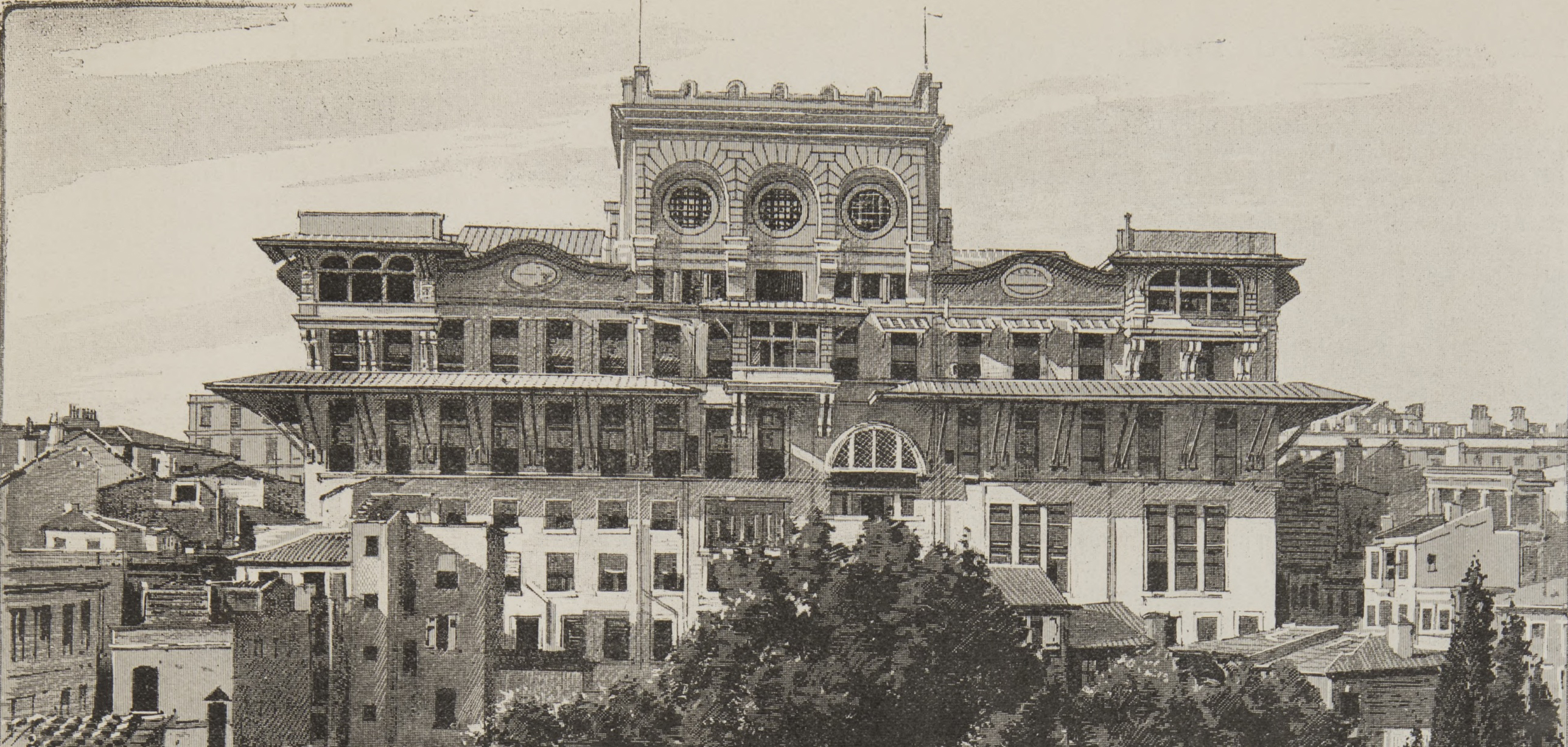
- Imperial Ottoman Bank headquarters, 1896
Date	26 August 1896
Location	Ottoman Bank, Istanbul, Ottoman Empire
Result	Death of ten of the Armenian militants and Ottoman soldiers: Massacre and pogroms of some 6,000 Armenians living in Constantinople

Belligerents
Ottoman Empire	Armenian Revolutionary Federation

Commanders and leaders
	Papken Siuni †; Armen Garo

Strength
Ottoman regulars	28 armed men and women

The occupation of the Ottoman Bank (Turkish: Osmanlı Bankası Baskını, "Raid on the Ottoman Bank"; Armenian: Պանք Օթօմանի գրաւումը, Bank Otomani k'ravumĕ "Ottoman Bank takeover") by members of the Armenian Revolutionary Federation (Dashnak Party) took place in Constantinople, the capital of the Ottoman Empire on 26 August 1896. In an effort to raise further awareness and action by the major European powers, 28 armed men and women led primarily by Papken Siuni and Armen Garo took over the bank which largely employed European personnel from Great Britain and France. Stirred largely due to the inaction of the European powers in regard to Hamidian massacres started by Sultan Abdul Hamid II, the Armenian Revolutionary Federation members saw its seizure as a means to bring full attention to their plight. At the time, the Ottoman Bank served as an important financial center for both the Empire and the countries of Europe.

Armed with pistols, grenades, dynamite and hand-held bombs, the seizure of the bank lasted for 14 hours, resulting in the deaths of ten of the Armenian men and Ottoman soldiers. The Ottoman reaction to the takeover saw further massacres and pogroms of 6,000 Armenians living in Constantinople and also Hamid threatening to level the entire building itself. However, intervention on part of the European diplomats in the city managed to persuade the men to give way, assigning safe passage to the survivors to France. Despite the level of violence the Turks had wrought, the takeover was reported positively in the European press, praising the Armenian men for their courage and the objectives they attempted to accomplish. Nevertheless, aside from issuing a note condemning the pogroms in the city, the European powers did not act on their promises to enforce reforms in the country as future massacres of Armenians continued to take place.

== Background ==
The Armenians suffered from persecution and forced assimilation under Ottoman rule. The Armenians lived in their own villages and city quarters, separate from the Muslims. They were subjected to heavy taxes and were downgraded as a separate group of Ottoman society, called a millet. Various Armenians who were resentful of Ottoman persecution took up arms to defend their basic rights. This infuriated the Sultan Abdul-Hamid II who viewed the small resistance as a threat to his power. In the 1890s, up to 300,000 Armenians had been massacred on the implicit orders of Sultan Hamid, massacres commonly known as the Hamidian massacres.

== Activities ==
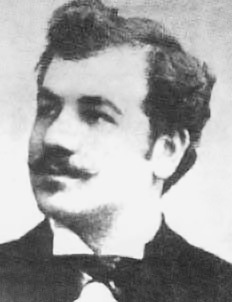
Armen Garo was one of the chief planners who survived

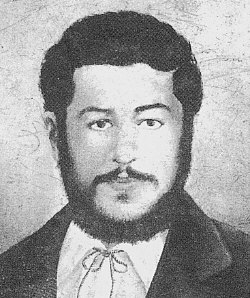
Papken Siuni, the chief organizer of the attack.

=== Planning ===
The Armenian Revolutionary Federation sought to stop the murder of Armenians and planned the bank takeover to gain the attention and intervention of world powers. The plan to occupy the Ottoman Bank was masterminded by Bedros Parian, better known by his nom de guerre Papken Siuni, who would lead the operation along with his head assistant, Haig (Hrach) Tiriakian. When Garegin Pastermadjian, better known by his nom de guerre, Armen Garo accepted to take part in the act in February 1896, the arrangements to raid the bank started. From the start, the Armenian Revolutionary Federation handed out fliers to the general population of the Ottoman Empire stating that their fight was not against them but the Ottoman Empire's oppression. The decision to take over the Ottoman Bank was a strategic one as the bank held many European treasuries which would therefore attract the Europeans' attention the Armenians wanted. The men had been singled out because "apart from the interests of the European powers the various financial markets would also suffer heavy loss through the destruction of their property."

=== Seizure ===
On Wednesday, 26 August 1896, 13:00 o'clock, 26 Armenians from the Armenian Revolutionary Federation, armed with pistols and grenades and led by Papken Siuni, attacked and occupied the Ottoman Bank of Constantinople. The men entered the great hall of the Ottoman Bank armed with revolvers, daggers and dynamite bombs. Forming in small groups, they were accosted by one of the Albanian bank guards; they shot at him, triggering a shootout between the Armenians and the rest of the bank guards. During the initial part of the operation, nine of the attackers, including leader Papken Siuni were shot and killed in the firefight, and his role as leader of the operation was assumed by Armen Garo.

Threats were issued that if their list of political demands were not met, all hostages would be executed. They clarified that their goal was to dictate their political will.

=== Mob violence ===
The Galata Bridge linked the old and newer parts of the city across the narrow estuary winding inland from the Golden Horn. On one side cobbled streets run up from the bridge to Topkapı Palace, and the government offices. On the other the bridge opens up to the Galata (now Karaköy) financial district, from which narrow streets wind up other hills to the fashionable Pera (now Beyoğlu) area and finally Taksim Square at the top. On this side of the bridge the Armenian men concentrated in the Galata, Tünel and Tarlabasi around Pera. An Ottoman mob, mainly made up of bashibazouks and softas (students from the theological seminaries), took over a hotel in the city of Constantinople and bombs and shots and missiles fairly rained upon the heads of the passersby, wounding many persons. The mob surrounding the bank extended to several villages on the Bosporus including Tepe bashi and on the Asiatic coast of the Sea of Marmara. The weapons used by the populace were clubs and knives. The ulemas and softas," most of whom resided in Constantinople, rushed across the bridge towards Pera and Galata but were met by squads of cavalry who forced them back, thus confining their efforts at massacre to the Armenians in the close region.

The Ottoman soldiers cut the bridge, thus preventing the riot from growing, but behind the barricade the deadly fight between the two group progressed with but little noise. As the massacre progressed, the bombs were thrown and pistol shots discharged from houses at various points with no apparent object. At the railroad depot on Seraglio Point an officer requested that some fifteen Armenian employees of the Oriental [sic] Express be delivered to him.

Different sources also contain reports of the city's Jews simultaneously aiding Armenians and taking them into the shelter of their homes, as well as of them joining the Muslim mobs and partaking in the pillaging of Armenian shops and homes.

=== Negotiations ===
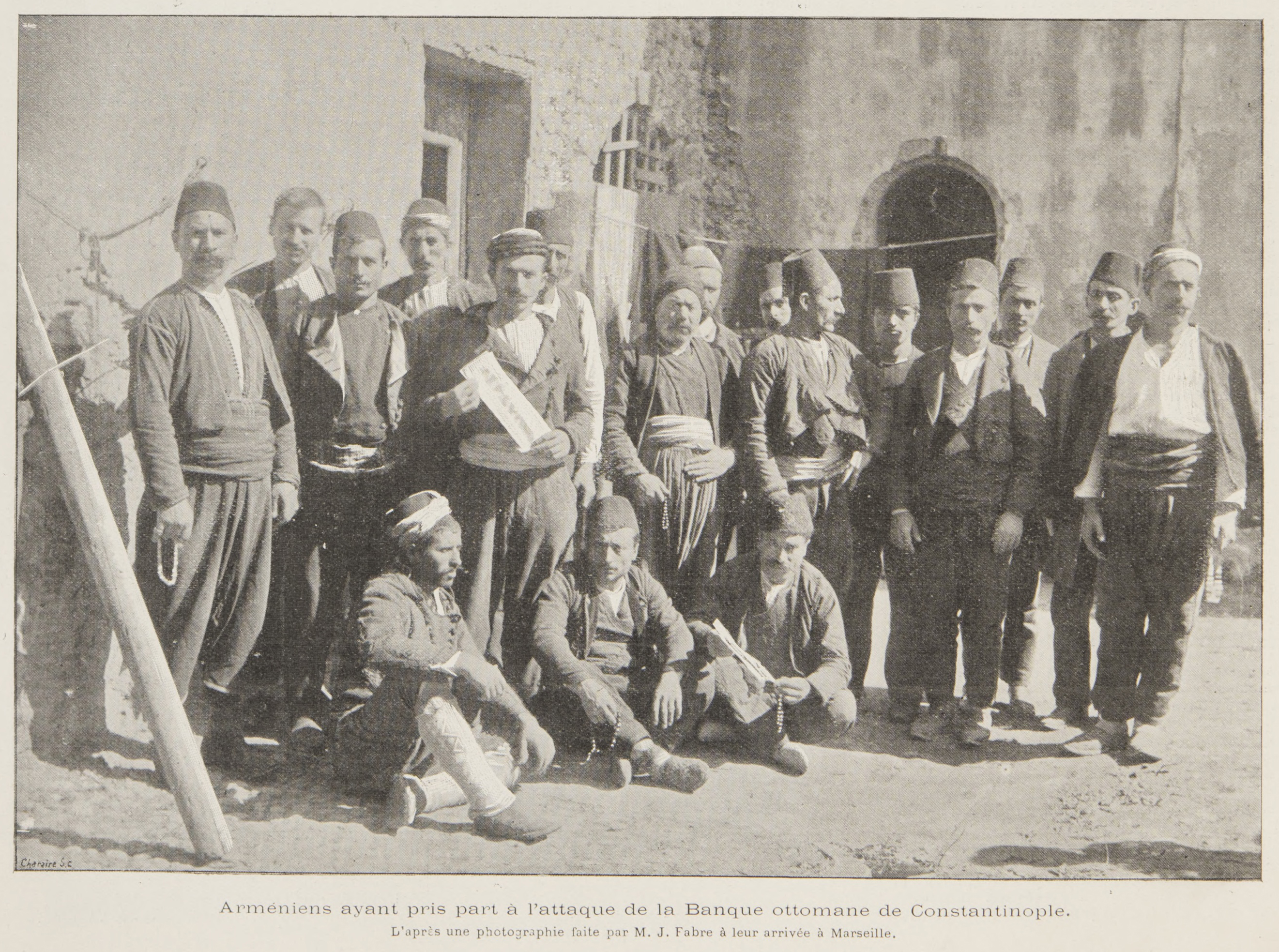
Surviving members of the takeover after they arrived in Marseille.

On the same day, the revolutionaries sent a letter to the European major powers demanding that the sultan promise to attend to their demands and hand over the solution of the Armenian Question to an international judge. Otherwise, on the third day, they would blow themselves and the bank up. The following manifesto was issued to the Ottoman public:

For centuries our forbears have been living with you in peace and harmony...but recently your government, conceived in crimes, began to sow discord among us in order to strangle us and you with greater ease. You, people, did not understand this diabolical scheme of politics and, soaking yourselves in the blood of our brothers, you became an accomplice in the perpetration of this heinous crime. Nevertheless, know well that our fight is not against you, but your government, against which your own best sons are fighting also.

After fourteen hours of occupation and repelling government attempts to retake the bank, the ambassadors of Europe, principally through the good offices of Russian consul Maximov, and the director of the bank, Sir Edgar Vincent, succeeded in persuading the Armenian men to leave the bank by promising to meet to their demands as well as grant them safe passage out of the bank. Sir Edgar's secretary told the revolutionaries that their action would alienate the European powers and cause a 'fearful massacre of Armenians' but they replied that if they died they would do so as martyrs and patriots. They were assured of a pardon and unhindered departure from the city on board Sir Edgar Vincent's private yacht.

== Aftermath ==
=== Massacres ===
Retribution against the ordinary Armenian populace in Constantinople was swift and brutal. Ottomans loyal to the government began to massacre the Armenians in Constantinople itself. Two days into the takeover, the Ottoman softas and bashibazouks, armed by the Sultan, went on a rampage and slaughtered thousands of Armenians living in the city. According to the foreign diplomats in Constantinople, Ottoman central authorities instructed the mob "to start killing Armenians, irrespective of age and gender, for the duration of 48 hours." The killings only stopped when the mob was ordered to desist from such activity by Sultan Hamid. They murdered around 6,000 – 7,000 Armenians. Within 48 hours of the bank seizure, estimates had the dead numbering between 3,000 and 4,000, as authorities made no effort to contain the killings of Armenians and the looting of their homes and businesses.

On 15 September 1896, three weeks after the bank raid, Ottoman authorities organized a massacre in the town of Egin, in the eastern province of Harput. Egin was chosen as the target because the leader of the bank raiding party, Papken Siuni, was a native of the town. According to a report by the French Ambassador, Ottoman troops killed "upwards of 2000 Armenians" in Egin, including "many women and children". A report by the British Consul at Harput, citing figures supplied by an Ottoman official, says that 1500 were killed, including 200 women and children. Of the 1500 houses located in the Armenian quarter of Egin, 980 were pillaged and burned. According to another report by the British Consul at Harput, the pretext used to attack the town's Armenian quarter was an "indirect order" from the Sultan that "the Armenians of Egin were set to cause trouble and that the local authorities should 'take the necessary action'". The same report said that there was no revolutionary movement whatever, and the victims had given no offense. A few pistols and revolvers were found in the ruins of the burnt houses. In protest against all the massacres, the representatives of the major powers addressed an insulting letter to the sultan. Dadrian describes the Egin massacre as a "case of collective punishment through mass murder".

=== International response ===
The Armenian Revolutionary Federation's goals had been partially accomplished in getting the attention of the major powers.

Despite the nature of the takeover of the bank, the brutality endured by the Armenian civilian population in the wake of the incident overshadowed the incident itself, renewing Western concern for Armenian safety in the Ottoman Empire. United States President Grover Cleveland, responding to widespread support for the Armenian cause galvanized by American missionaries stationed in the Ottoman Empire, condemned "the rage of mad bigotry and cruel fanaticism," the "not infrequent reports of the wanton destruction of homes and the bloody butchery of men, women, and children, made martyrs to their profession of Christian faith."

I do not believe that the present sombre prospect in Turkey will be long permitted to offend the sight of Christendom. It so mars the humane and enlightened civilization that belongs to the close of the 19th century that it seems hardly possible that the earnest demand of good peoples throughout the Christian world for its corrective treatment will remain unanswered.

Cleveland rejected the possibility of asserting American military force to protect Armenians in the Ottoman Empire, offering accommodation to "those who seek to avoid the perils which threaten them in Turkish dominions."

== Cultural references ==
An Armenian revolutionary song titled Papken Siuniyi Hishadagin ("In Memory of Papken Siuni") or popularly known as Ottoman Bank is about the events of the takeover.

== See also ==
- Yıldız assassination attempt

== Bibliography ==
- Balakian, Peter (30 September 2003). The Burning Tigris: The Armenian Genocide and America's Response. HarperCollins. ISBN 978-0-06-019840-4.
