= Boylu, Kemaliye =

Village in Turkey

Boylu
- Village
- Location in Turkey
- Coordinates: 39.1293°N 38.6429°E
- Country: Turkey
- Province: Erzincan
- District: Kemaliye
- Population (2022): 35
- Time zone: UTC+3 (TRT)

Boylu is a village in the Kemaliye District of Erzincan Province in Turkey. Its population is 35 (2022).
