= Subaşı, Kemaliye =

Village in Turkey

Subaşı
- Village
- Location in Turkey
- Coordinates: 39.270°N 38.654°E
- Country: Turkey
- Province: Erzincan
- District: Kemaliye
- Population (2022): 19
- Time zone: UTC+3 (TRT)

Subaşı is a village in the Kemaliye District of Erzincan Province in Turkey. Its population is 19 (2022).
