= Topkapı, Kemaliye =

Village in Turkey

Topkapı
- Village
- Location in Turkey
- Coordinates: 39.089°N 38.694°E
- Country: Turkey
- Province: Erzincan
- District: Kemaliye
- Population (2022): 236
- Time zone: UTC+3 (TRT)

Topkapı is a village in the Kemaliye District of Erzincan Province in Turkey. Its population is 236 (2022).
