= Güldibi, Kemaliye =

Village in Turkey

Güldibi
- Village
- Location in Turkey
- Coordinates: 39.324°N 38.506°E
- Country: Turkey
- Province: Erzincan
- District: Kemaliye
- Population (2022): 10
- Time zone: UTC+3 (TRT)

Güldibi is a village in the Kemaliye District of Erzincan Province in Turkey. Its population is 10 (2022).
