= Kavacık, Kemaliye =

Village in Turkey

Kavacık
- Village
- Location in Turkey
- Coordinates: 39.227°N 38.682°E
- Country: Turkey
- Province: Erzincan
- District: Kemaliye
- Population (2022): 10
- Time zone: UTC+3 (TRT)

Kavacık is a village in the Kemaliye District of Erzincan Province in Turkey. Its population is 10 (2022).
