= Yeşilyayla, Kemaliye =

Village in Turkey

Yeşilyayla
- Village
- Location in Turkey
- Coordinates: 39.2655°N 38.6816°E
- Country: Turkey
- Province: Erzincan
- District: Kemaliye
- Population (2022): 15
- Time zone: UTC+3 (TRT)

Yeşilyayla is a village in the Kemaliye District of Erzincan Province in Turkey. Its population is 15 (2022).
