= Esence, Kemaliye =

Village in Turkey

Esence
- Village
- Location in Turkey
- Coordinates: 39.237°N 38.680°E
- Country: Turkey
- Province: Erzincan
- District: Kemaliye
- Population (2022): 11
- Time zone: UTC+3 (TRT)

Esence is a village in the Kemaliye District of Erzincan Province in Turkey. Its population is 11 (2022).
