= Gözaydın, Kemaliye =

Village in Turkey

Gözaydın
- Village
- Location in Turkey
- Coordinates: 39°13′32″N 38°22′47″E
- Country: Turkey
- Province: Erzincan
- District: Kemaliye
- Population (2022): 47
- Time zone: UTC+3 (TRT)

Gözaydın is a village in the Kemaliye District of Erzincan Province in Turkey. Its population is 47 (2022).
