= Yeşilyurt, Kemaliye =

Village in Turkey

Yeşilyurt
- Village
- Location in Turkey
- Coordinates: 39.197°N 38.557°E
- Country: Turkey
- Province: Erzincan
- District: Kemaliye
- Population (2022): 31
- Time zone: UTC+3 (TRT)

Yeşilyurt is a village in the Kemaliye District of Erzincan Province in Turkey. Its population is 31 (2022).
