= Toybelen, Kemaliye =

Village in Turkey

Toybelen
- Village
- Location in Turkey
- Coordinates: 39.247°N 38.514°E
- Country: Turkey
- Province: Erzincan
- District: Kemaliye
- Population (2022): 53
- Time zone: UTC+3 (TRT)

Toybelen is a village in the Kemaliye District of Erzincan Province in Turkey. Its population is 53 (2022).
