= Yıldızlı, Kemaliye =

Village in Turkey

Yıldızlı
- Village
- Location in Turkey
- Coordinates: 39.182°N 38.700°E
- Country: Turkey
- Province: Erzincan
- District: Kemaliye
- Population (2022): 32
- Time zone: UTC+3 (TRT)

Yıldızlı is a village in the Kemaliye District of Erzincan Province in Turkey. Its population is 32 (2022).
