= Tuğlu, Kemaliye =

Village in Turkey

Tuğlu
- Village
- Location in Turkey
- Coordinates: 39.220°N 38.625°E
- Country: Turkey
- Province: Erzincan
- District: Kemaliye
- Population (2022): 24
- Time zone: UTC+3 (TRT)

Tuğlu is a village in the Kemaliye District of Erzincan Province in Turkey. Its population is 24 (2022).
