= Ergü, Kemaliye =

Village in Turkey

Ergü
- Village
- Location in Turkey
- Coordinates: 39°13′N 38°32′E
- Country: Turkey
- Province: Erzincan
- District: Kemaliye
- Population (2022): 50
- Time zone: UTC+3 (TRT)

Ergü is a village in the Kemaliye District of Erzincan Province in Turkey. Its population is 50 (2022).
