= Harmankaya, Kemaliye =

Village in Turkey

Harmankaya
- Village
- Location in Turkey
- Coordinates: 39.300°N 38.394°E
- Country: Turkey
- Province: Erzincan
- District: Kemaliye
- Population (2022): 23
- Time zone: UTC+3 (TRT)

Harmankaya is a village in the Kemaliye District of Erzincan Province in Turkey. Its population is 23 (2022).
