= Yaka, Kemaliye =

Village in Turkey

Yaka
- Village
- Location in Turkey
- Coordinates: 39.280°N 38.498°E
- Country: Turkey
- Province: Erzincan
- District: Kemaliye
- Population (2022): 14
- Time zone: UTC+3 (TRT)

Yaka is a village in the Kemaliye District of Erzincan Province in Turkey. Its population is 14 (2022).
