= Kutluca, Kemaliye =

Village in Turkey

Kutluca
- Village
- Location in Turkey
- Coordinates: 39.184°N 38.644°E
- Country: Turkey
- Province: Erzincan
- District: Kemaliye
- Population (2022): 21
- Time zone: UTC+3 (TRT)

Kutluca is a village in the Kemaliye District of Erzincan Province in Turkey. Its population is 21 (2022).
