= Arslanoba, Kemaliye =

Village in Turkey

Arslanoba
- Village
- Location in Turkey
- Coordinates: 39°16′N 38°37′E
- Country: Turkey
- Province: Erzincan
- District: Kemaliye
- Population (2022): 22
- Time zone: UTC+3 (TRT)

Arslanoba is a village in the Kemaliye District of Erzincan Province in Turkey. Its population is 22 (2022).
