= Yuva, Kemaliye =

Village in Turkey

Yuva
- Village
- Location in Turkey
- Coordinates: 39°14′51″N 38°30′39″E
- Country: Turkey
- Province: Erzincan
- District: Kemaliye
- Population (2022): 20
- Time zone: UTC+3 (TRT)

Yuva is a village in the Kemaliye District of Erzincan Province in Turkey. Its population is 20 (2022).
