= Çit, Kemaliye =

Village in Turkey

Çit
- Village
- Location in Turkey
- Coordinates: 39°6′41″N 38°36′12″E
- Country: Turkey
- Province: Erzincan
- District: Kemaliye
- Population (2022): 93
- Time zone: UTC+3 (TRT)

Çit (also: Çitköy) is a village in the Kemaliye District of Erzincan Province in Turkey. Its population is 93 (2022).
