= Esertepe, Kemaliye =

Village in Turkey

Esertepe
- Neighbourhood
- Location in Turkey
- Coordinates: 39.2925°N 38.4963°E
- Country: Turkey
- Province: Erzincan
- District: Kemaliye
- Municipality: Kemaliye
- Population (2022): 13
- Time zone: UTC+3 (TRT)

Esertepe is a neighbourhood of the town Kemaliye, Kemaliye District, Erzincan Province, Turkey. Its population is 13 (2022).
