= Sırakonak, Kemaliye =

Village in Turkey

Sırakonak
- Village
- Location in Turkey
- Coordinates: 39.229°N 38.486°E
- Country: Turkey
- Province: Erzincan
- District: Kemaliye
- Population (2022): 39
- Time zone: UTC+3 (TRT)

Sırakonak is a village in the Kemaliye District of Erzincan Province in Turkey. Its population is 39 (2022).
