= Çaldere, Kemaliye =

Village in Turkey

Çaldere
- Village
- Location in Turkey
- Coordinates: 39.3336°N 38.5616°E
- Country: Turkey
- Province: Erzincan
- District: Kemaliye
- Population (2022): 22
- Time zone: UTC+3 (TRT)

Çaldere is a village in the Kemaliye District of Erzincan Province in Turkey. Its population is 22 (2022).
