= Papken Siuni =

Armenian revolutionary (1873–1896)

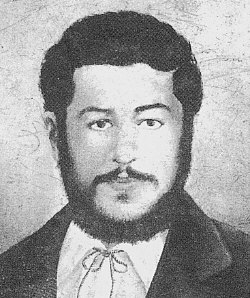
- Papken Siuni, c. 1890s
- Native name: Բաբգէն Սիւնի
- Born: 1873; Pingian, Harput Vilayet, Ottoman Empire (now Adatepe, Turkey)
- Died: 26 August 1896 (aged 22–23) Constantinople, Ottoman Empire (now Istanbul, Turkey)
- Service years: ?–1896
- Known for: 1896 Ottoman Bank takeover
- Conflicts: Armenian National Liberation Movement

Bedros Parian (Armenian: Պետրոս Փարեան; 1873 – 26 August 1896), better known by his nom de guerre Papken Siuni (Բաբգէն Սիւնի), was an Armenian revolutionary and a leading figure in the late 19th-century Armenian national movement. A member of the Armenian Revolutionary Federation (ARF), he co-led the 1896 Ottoman Bank takeover, a seminal event aimed at internationalizing the Armenian Question amid the Hamidian massacres. His death during the operation cemented his status as a martyr in Armenian history.

== Early life and education ==
Bedros Parian was born in 1873 in the village of Pingian (modern-day Adatepe), near Akn in the Harput Vilayet of the Ottoman Empire. His family belonged to the Armenian peasantry, though they traced their lineage to the medieval Artsakh nobility. The region's Armenian population faced systemic discrimination under Ottoman rule, including heavy taxation and periodic violence.

In 1887, Parian moved to Constantinople to attend the Getronagan Armenian High School, a hub for Armenian intellectual and nationalist thought. There, he joined clandestine student circles influenced by the Armenian Enlightenment and the writings of Mkrtich Khrimian. His teachers included prominent intellectuals like Reteos Berberian, who emphasized Armenian cultural revival.

== Revolutionary career ==
=== Early activism ===
Parian adopted the pseudonym "Siuni" in homage to Syunik, a historic Armenian region known for resistance against foreign rule. By 1890, he co-founded the underground group Syunik, which merged with the ARF in 1893. The ARF, founded in 1890, sought to unify Armenian resistance through armed struggle and diplomatic appeals to European powers.

=== Hamidian massacres and radicalization ===
The Hamidian massacres (1894–1896) devastated Armenian communities, claiming over 100,000 lives. Parian's parents were killed during massacres in Harput, a trauma that radicalized him. In 1895, he relocated to Constantinople, where he organized ARF cells and distributed anti-Ottoman literature. Disguised as a porter, he evaded Ottoman authorities while smuggling weapons.

== Ottoman Bank takeover ==
=== Planning and objectives ===
In early 1896, ARF leaders, including Christapor Mikaelian, approved Siuni's proposal to seize the Ottoman Bank, a financial hub for European investors. The operation aimed to force European intervention by threatening economic interests. Siuni and Karekin Pastermadjian (Armen Garo) recruited 28 militants, including students and artisans, and stockpiled grenades and Mauser pistols.

=== The attack ===
On 26 August 1896, the group stormed the bank, taking 150 hostages. Siuni carried explosives under a traditional Armenian vest (arkhalig). During the initial assault, a stray bullet detonated a grenade, killing him instantly. Despite his death, the militants held the bank for 14 hours, demanding European oversight for Armenian reforms.

=== Aftermath ===
French and Russian diplomats negotiated the militants' safe passage to Marseille. While the takeover drew global headlines, European powers took no concrete action, emboldening Ottoman reprisals. Over 6,000 Armenians in Constantinople were massacred in retaliation.

== Legacy ==
Papken Siuni became a symbol of Armenian resistance. The ARF eulogized him as a "martyr of the nation," and his portrait circulated widely in Armenian diaspora communities. In 2016, a memorial plaque was installed near the Ottoman Bank building (now the Istanbul Museum of the History of Science and Technology in Islam).

Historians debate the takeover's efficacy. While some argue it raised international awareness, others criticize it for provoking further violence. (Note: Taner Akçam argues that such operations inadvertently justified Ottoman claims of Armenian "sedition," escalating state violence. In his memoirs, Karekin Pastermadjian, a planner of the takeover, wrote that international indifference left no peaceful alternatives.) Nevertheless, Siuni's tactics influenced later ARF operations, including the 1904 Sasun uprising.

== See also ==
- Armenian resistance during the Armenian genocide
- Karekin Pastermadjian
- Armenian Revolutionary Federation

== Bibliography ==
- Nersisyan, A. (1996). "Babken Syuni". In Khudaverdyan, Kostandin (ed.). Հայկական Հարցի Հանրագիտարան [Encyclopedia of the Armenian Question] (in Armenian). Yerevan: Armenian Encyclopedia Publishing. p. 71.
- Kévorkian, Raymond (2011). The Armenian Genocide: A Complete History. London: Bloomsbury Academic. ISBN 9780857730206.
- Suny, Ronald Grigor (2015). The Armenian Genocide: A Complete History. London: I.B. Tauris. ISBN 978-0-6911-4730-7.
- Walker, Christopher J. (1990). Armenia: The Survival of a Nation. New York: St. Martin's Press. ISBN 978-0-312-04230-1.
- Hoffmann, Tessa (2016). "The 1896 Ottoman Bank Takeover: A Reassessment". Armenian Review. 57 (1–2): 45–68.
- Pasdermadjian, Garegin (1918). Why Armenia Should Be Free. Boston: Hairenik Publishing.
- Berberian, Nazaret (14 August 2014). "118 տարի առաջ Պանք Օթոմանը գրաւած էր Դաշնակցութեան կոմիտէն". Horizon Weekly (in Armenian).
- Akçam, Taner (2007). A Shameful Act: The Armenian Genocide and the Question of Turkish Responsibility. New York: Metropolitan Books. ISBN 978-0-8050-7932-6.
