= Kemaliye District =

District of Erzincan Province, Turkey

- District
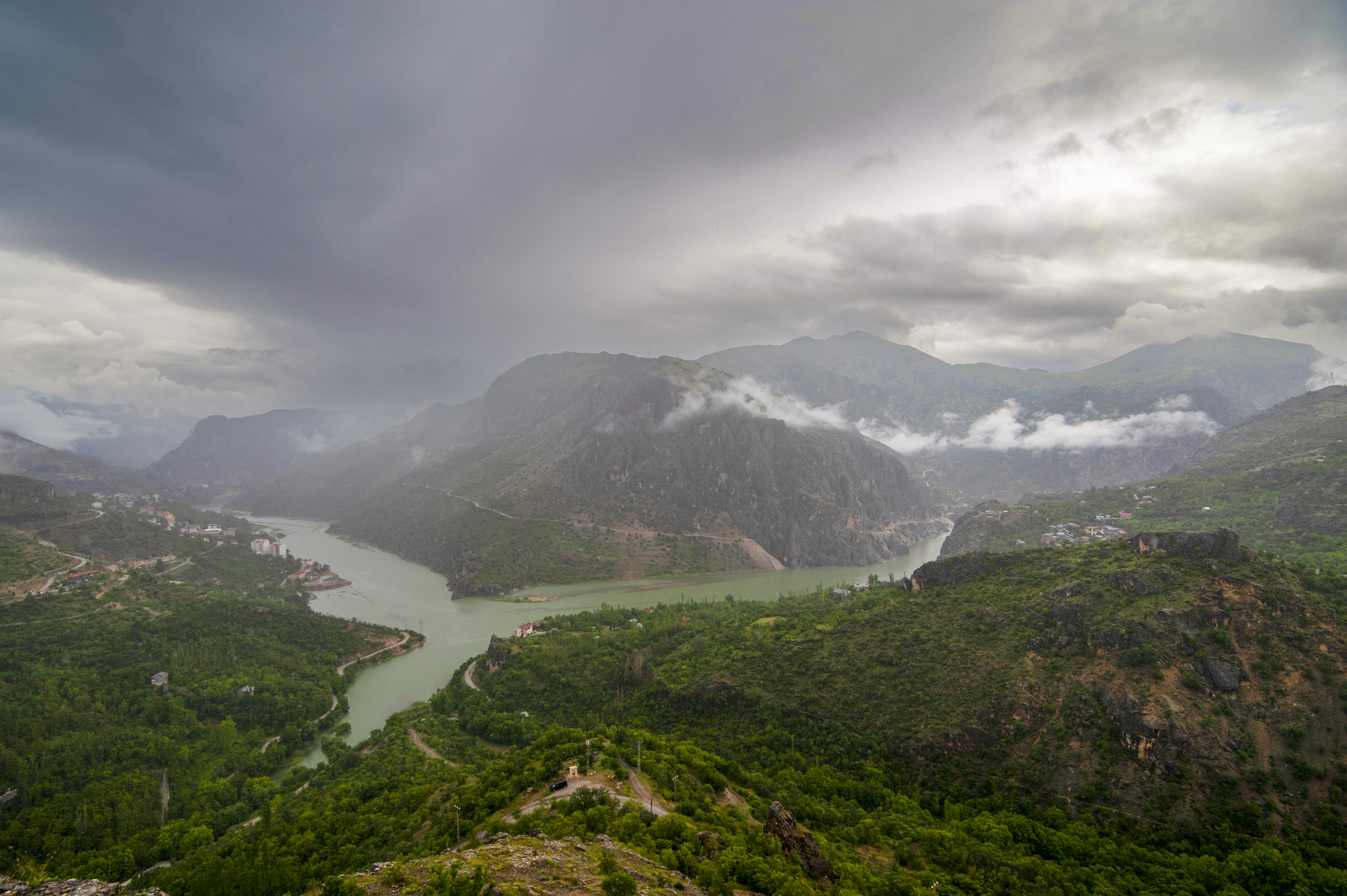
- Karasu River, Kemaliye

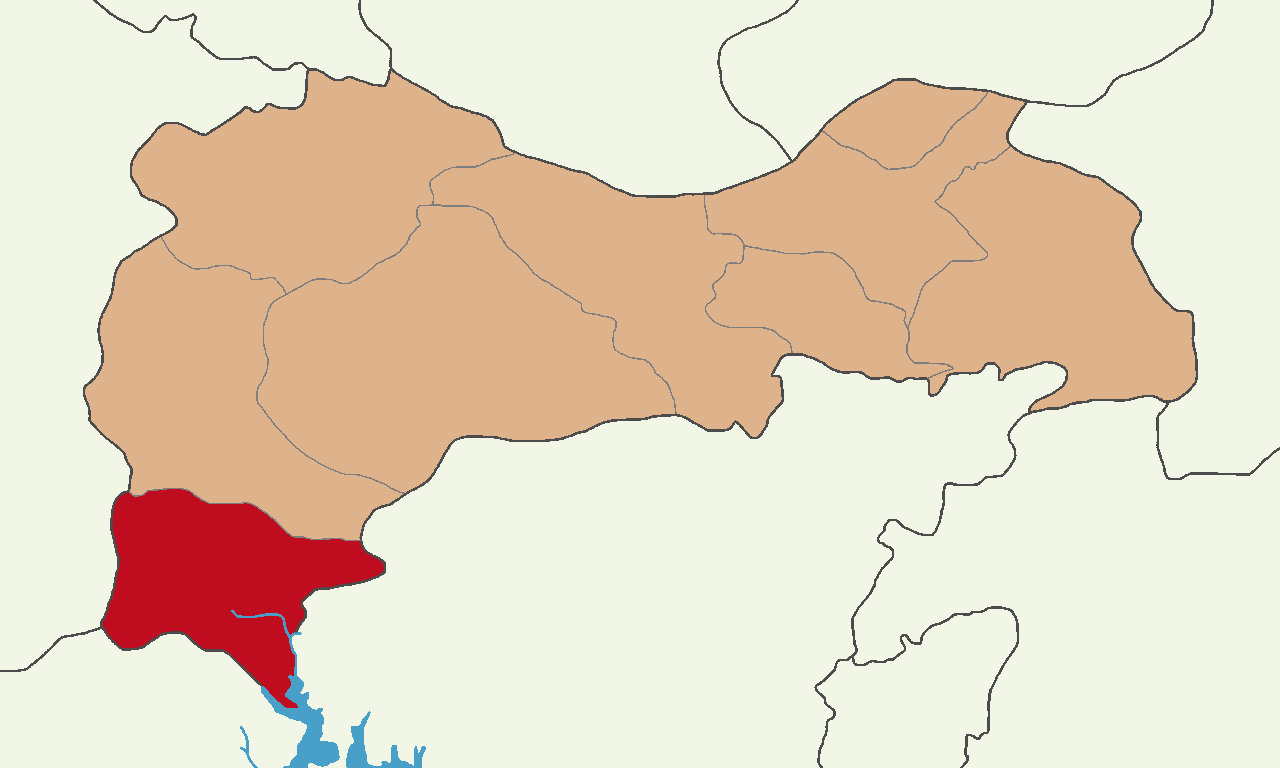
- Map showing Kemaliye District in Erzincan Province

- Location within Turkey
- Coordinates: 39°16′N 38°30′E
- Country: Turkey
- Province: Erzincan
- Seat: Kemaliye

Government
  - Kaymakam: İlhan Kayatürk
- Area: 1,207 km^{2} (466 sq mi)
- Population (2022): 5,170
  - Density: 4.28/km^{2} (11.1/sq mi)
- Time zone: UTC+3 (TRT)
- Website: www.kemaliye.gov.tr

Kemaliye District is a district of the Erzincan Province of Turkey. Its seat is the town of Kemaliye. Its area is 1,207 km^{2}, and its population is 5,170 (2022).

== Composition ==
There is one municipality in Kemaliye District:

- Kemaliye

There are 61 villages in Kemaliye District:

- Adak
- Ağıl
- Akçalı
- Aksöğüt
- Apçağa
- Armağan
- Arslanoba
- Aşağıumutlu
- Avcı
- Balkırı
- Başarı
- Başbağlar
- Başpınar
- Boylu
- Buğdaypınar
- Çakırtaş
- Çaldere
- Çanakçı
- Çat
- Çit
- Dallıca
- Demir
- Dilli
- Dolunay
- Dutluca
- Efeler
- Ergü
- Esence
- Gözaydın
- Güldibi
- Gümüşçeşme
- Günyolu
- Harmankaya
- Kabataş
- Karakoçlu
- Karapınar
- Kavacık
- Keklikpınarı
- Kışlacık
- Kocaçimen
- Kozlupınar
- Kuşak
- Kutluca
- Ocak
- Şahinler
- Salihli
- Sandık
- Sırakonak
- Subaşı
- Topkapı
- Toybelen
- Tuğlu
- Yaka
- Yayladamı
- Yazmakaya
- Yeşilyamaç
- Yeşilyayla
- Yeşilyurt
- Yıldızlı
- Yukarıumutlu
- Yuva
