= Kemaliye =

Kemaliye Akn • Ակն
- Municipality
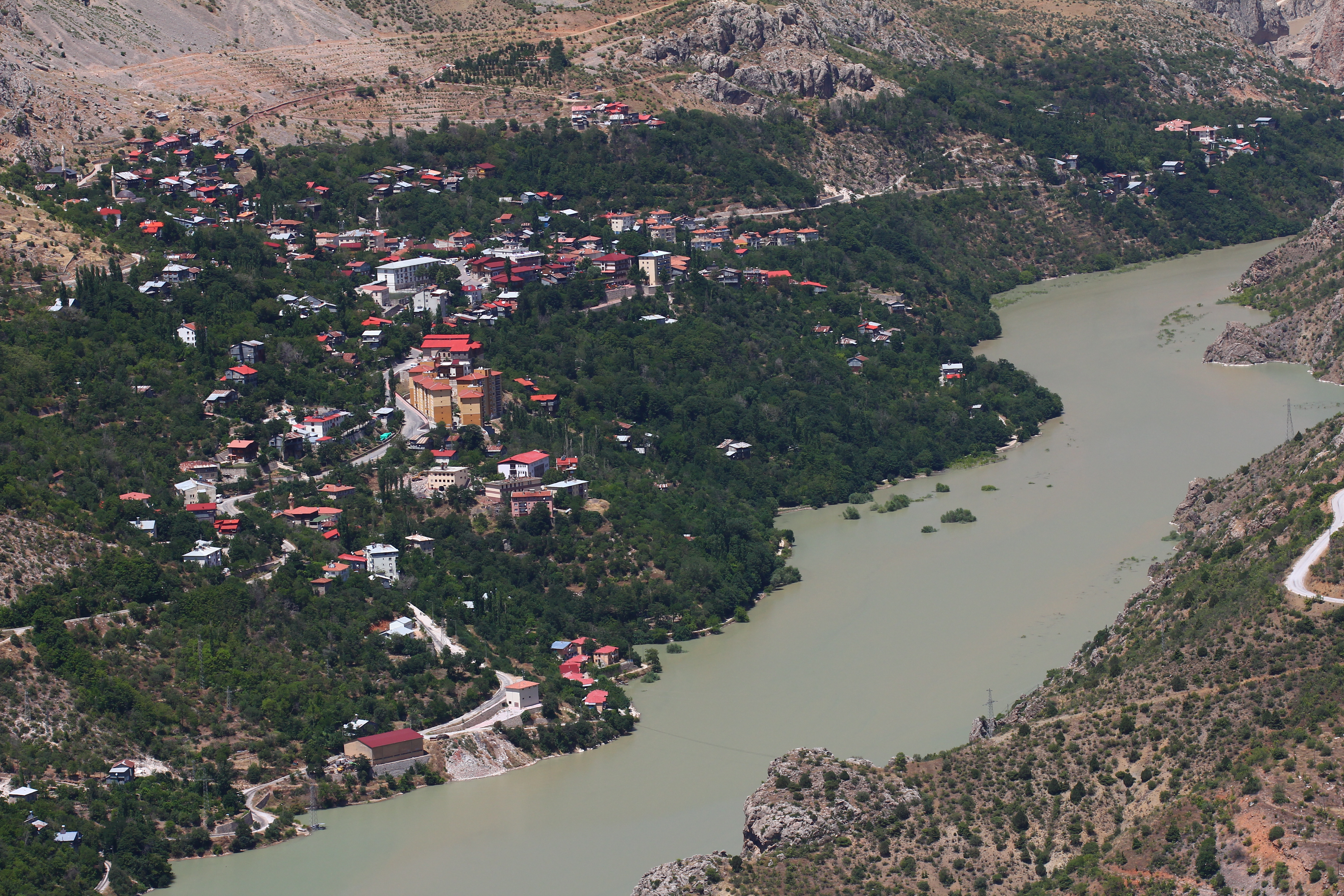

- Location within Turkey
- Coordinates: 39°15′39″N 38°29′48″E
- Country: Turkey
- Province: Erzincan
- District: Kemaliye

Government
  - Mayor: Mehmet Karaman (MHP)
- Elevation: 1,130 m (3,710 ft)
- Population (2022): 2,536
- Time zone: UTC+3 (TRT)
- Postal code: 24530
- Area code: 0446
- Website: www.kemaliye.bel.tr

Kemaliye, formerly Eğin (Armenian: Ակն, romanized: Akn, meaning "spring"), is a town in Erzincan Province in the Eastern Anatolia region of Turkey. It is the seat of Kemaliye District. Its population is 2,536 (2022).

The town is known for its historic architecture, including many Ottoman-era houses. It is also notable for its commanding view of the river Karasu (Euphrates) flowing south through a gorge above the Keban Dam. The town consists of 11 quarters: Dörtyolağzı, Gençağa, Ariki, Hacıyusuf, Halilağa, Naip, Bahçe, Sandıkbağı, Taşdibi, Isakpaşa and Esertepe.

== History ==
Eğin may have been founded by Paulician Armenian Christians in the 9th century. Certainly, a Paulician state was headquartered at nearby Tephrike (modern Divriği) by 844.

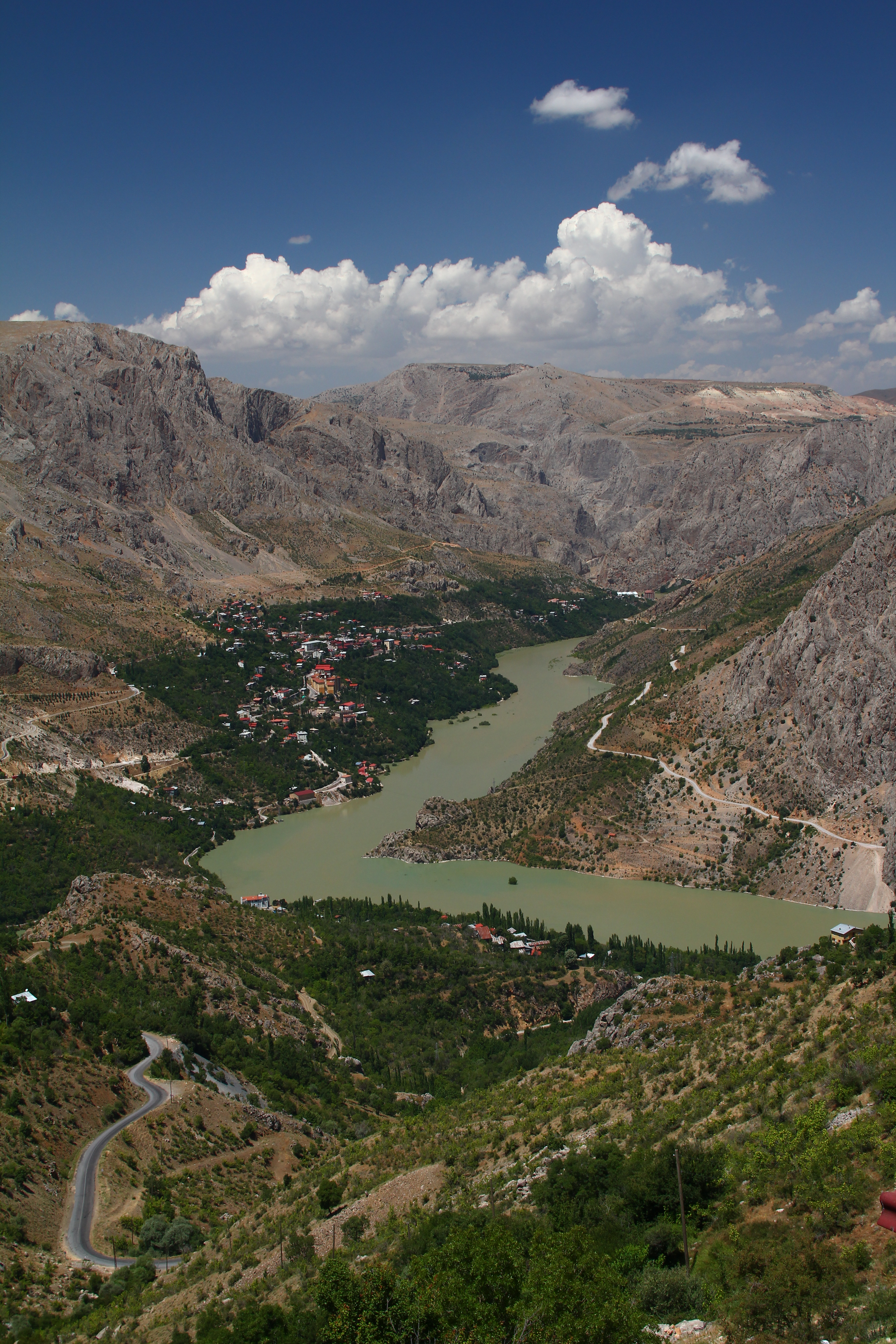
View of Kemaliye (Eğin), Erzincan

Alternatively, the 1911 Encyclopædia Britannica reports that Eğin was settled by Armenians who emigrated from Van in the 11th century with King Senekerim-Hovhannes of Vaspurakan of the Artsruni dynasty).

Eğin became known as a center of Armenian musicians, and later, literary poets.

In 1813, James Playfair's "A System of Geography" described Eğin as "[A] little town in the form of an amphitheatre, at the foot of a mountain, in a fruitful tract that reaches to the Euphrates."

The British explorer Francis Rawdon Chesney followed the course of the Euphrates for a survey expedition between 1835 and 1837, and mentions Eğin as "a town of 2700 houses on the right bank". In comparison, he counts about 3000 houses in Erzincan and 2923 families in Malatya. Chesney describes Eğin's situation in a deep valley where the "mountains rise to about 4000 feet on each side of this singular fissure, which is so narrow that it is crossed by a bridge between lofty limestone precipices seeming to overhang the town and as it were to threaten its destruction."

In 1895, the British geographer Charles William Wilson describes Eğin as follows in a travel guide to Asia Minor:

It is a picturesque town, hung in a theatre of rocks so steep and high that there is very short sunlight in the day. An abundant spring, whence the name, rises at the top of the town and supports much vegetation from which the air takes a heavy, moist character. The streets are mere rock ladders. The stone houses standing in the terraced gardens, and orchards, are amongst the best in Anatolia. The bazar is good but there is little outside trade. Cotton cloth (manusa) is manufactured. There is no decent khân and private lodging must be sought. The goitre is a common disease in the district. Of the 10,000 inhabitants, half are Armenians, in whoso largest church is preserved an 11th centy MS. of the Gospels, said to be written by a king of Sasun for his daughter. There are also some good Persian tiles. The spring head and mosque near it are worth seeing. Many of the young men seek work in Constantinople, Smyrna and other towns. They have a high reputation as bankers and money-changers, and are also found as cooks, kaïkjis and hammals at Stambûl. When they have saved enough money they return build a house, and settle down. Egin was one of the places in which the Armenians who emigrated from Vasburagan, with Senekherim, in the 11th centy., settled. — Charles William Wilson (1895). Handbook for Travellers in Asia Minor, Transcaucasia, Persia, Etc. p. 251.

Armenian historian Vahakn Dadrian reports that in 1896, the town was evenly divided between Armenians and Muslims (Turks and Kurds). He says that Eğin was notable for its prosperity and had previously escaped the 1895–1896 Hamidian massacres through a ransom payment by the Armenians of 1500 Turkish gold pounds. However, British archaeologist David George Hogarth writing for the 1911 Encyclopædia Britannica noted a massacre of Armenians in Eğin on November 8, 1895.

Although Dadrian reports that Eğin escaped during the Hamidian massacres, he says it was less fortunate when the Ottoman government retaliated for the 1896 Ottoman Bank Takeover by Armenian Dashnaks (itself a response to the Hamidian massacres). On September 15, 1896, three weeks after the Ottoman Bank Takeover, Ottoman troops killed "upwards of 2,000 Armenians" including "many women and children" according to a report by the French Ambassador. Of the 1,500 houses located in the Armenian quarter of Eğin, 980 were pillaged and burned. Eğin was chosen to be the target of the massacre because the leader of the bank raiding party, Papken Siuni, was a native of Eğin. According to a report by the British Consul at Harput, the pretext used to attack the town's Armenian quarter was that the Armenians of the town were "set to cause trouble". The same report by the Consul said that there were no revolutionary movement whatever and no powder magazine exploded during the massacre. A few pistols and revolvers were found in the ruins of the burnt houses. Hogarth's report for the Encyclopædia Britannica 15 years later also notes a massacre of Armenians at Eğin "in the summer of 1896".

By 1911, Hogarth estimated the population of Eğin at 20,000 and assessed them as "fairly evenly divided between Armenian Christians and Muslims". He described Eğin as an important town in the Mamuretülaziz Vilayet "...picturesquely situated in a theatre of lofty, abrupt rocks, on the right bank of the western Euphrates, which is crossed by a wooden bridge. The stone houses stand in terraced gardens and orchards, and the streets are mere rock ladders."

On 21 October 1922, following the Turkish War of Independence, a decree was issued renaming Eğin as Kemaliye (and Selinti as Gazipaşa) in honor of Mustafa Kemal Pasha. The former name is still known and used locally and sometimes even beyond. Kemaliye was administered as part of Elazığ Province until 1926, and within Malatya Province between 1926 and 1938. In 1938 it was transferred to Erzincan Province.

The 1923 population exchange between Greece and Turkey (Greek: Ἡ Ἀνταλλαγή, Turkish: Mübâdele) stemmed from the "Convention Concerning the Exchange of Greek and Turkish Populations" signed at Lausanne, Switzerland, on 30 January 1923, by the governments of Greece and Turkey, had as result the evacuation of Egin from its Armenian-speaking Greek Orthodox minority population, inhabited there. After a most difficult journey of 8 months and more than a thousand kilometres, they reached the shores of Aegean and were transported (after various stations) in Diavata, near Thessaloniki and Kastaniotissa (new Egin), at the Greek island of Evia.

== Notable natives ==
- Avedis Petros XIV Arpiarian (1856–1937), 14th fourteenth patriarch of the Armenian Catholic Church
- Papken Siuni (1873–1896), leader of the Ottoman Bank takeover.
- Siamanto (1878–1915), Armenian writer, poet and national figure arrested on Red Sunday and killed during the Armenian genocide.
- Nikol Galanderian (1881–1944), Armenian composer of children's songs.
- Ahmet Cömert (1926–1990), Turkish boxer, coach, referee, boxing judge and sports official
