= Armenian national movement =

Nationalist movement in the Ottoman and Russian Empires

The Armenian national movement (Armenian: Հայ ազգային-ազատագրական շարժում Hay azgayin-azatagrakan sharzhum) (Note: also known as the Armenian liberation movement, Armenian revolutionary movement, (Armenian) Fedayee movement, (ֆիդայական շարժում), Armenian volunteer movement and Armenian revolution) included social, cultural, but primarily political and military movements that reached their height during World War I and the following years, initially seeking improved status for Armenians in the Ottoman and Russian Empires but eventually attempting to achieve an Armenian state.

Influenced by the Age of Enlightenment, the French Revolution, and the rise of other nationalist movements in the Ottoman Empire, the Armenian national awakening developed in the early 1860s. During the Tanzimat Era, the Armenian elite worked with Ottoman reformers to prevent banditry and abuses by nomadic Kurdish tribes, particularly in the six Armenian-populated vilayets of the Ottoman Empire. When this goal failed, Armenian nationalism took hold over the intelligentsia, and the autonomy or independence for Armenians in the Ottoman and the Russian Empires was the next step. Starting in the late 1880s, Armenian nationalists engaged in guerrilla warfare against the Ottoman government and Kurdish irregulars in the eastern regions of the empire, led by the three Armenian political parties: the Social Democrat Hunchakian Party (Hunchak), the Armenakan Party and the Armenian Revolutionary Federation (Dashnak). Armenian nationalists generally saw Russia as their ally for independence from the Turks, although Russia maintained an oppressive policy in the Caucasus. After the Young Turk Revolution, Armenian political parties replaced the traditional authority of the Ottoman loyalist amira class. These parties, especially the Dashnaks, held a tense working relationship with the Committee of Union and Progress. The Ottoman government signed the Armenian reform package in early 1914, however it was shelved by World War I.

During World War I, Armenians were systematically exterminated by the Ottoman government in the Armenian genocide. According to some estimates, from 1915 to 1917, about 800,000–1,500,000 Armenians were killed. After the decision to exterminate the Armenians was taken by the Ottoman Ministry of Interior, tens of thousands of Russian Armenians joined the Russian army as Armenian volunteer units upon Russian promises for autonomy. By 1917, Russia controlled many Armenian-populated areas of the Ottoman Empire. After the October Revolution, Russian forces retreated and transferred control of occupied Ottoman Anatolia to Armenian units. The Armenian National Council proclaimed the Republic of Armenia on May 28, 1918, thus establishing an Armenian state in the Armenian-populated parts of the Southern Caucasus.

By 1920, the Bolshevik Government in Russia and the Ankara government came to power in their respective countries. Turkish forces successfully invaded the western half of the Armenian Republic, while the Red Army invaded and annexed the country in December 1920. A friendship treaty was signed between Bolshevik Russia and the Ankara government in 1921. The formerly Russian-controlled parts of Armenia were mostly incorporated into the Soviet Union, of which the Armenian Soviet Socialist Republic was established. Hundreds of thousands of Armenian refugees found themselves in the Middle East, Greece, France and the United States giving start to a new era of the Armenian diaspora. Soviet Armenia existed until 1991, when the Soviet Union disintegrated and the current (Third) Republic of Armenia was established.

== Origins ==
During the rise of nationalism, Armenians were living among the Ottoman Empire and Russian Empire. In the middle of the 1826-1828 Russo-Persian War Tsar Nicholas I sought help from the Armenians, promising that after the war, their lives would improve. In 1828, Russia annexed Yerevan, Nakhichevan, and the surrounding countryside with the Treaty of Turkmenchay. Armenians still living under Persian rule were encouraged to emigrate to Russian Armenia and 30,000 followed the call. In 1828, Russia declared war on the Ottoman Empire, and in the Treaty of Adrianople, Akhalkalak and Akhaltsikhe annexed by Russia. A significant portion of Armenians were annexed into Russia. Another wave of Ottoman Armenian immigration occurred, with 25,000 settling in Russian Armenia.

In 1836, Russification programs targeted the Armenian Church. Russia curtailed the Church's advances in the society.

In 1839, Abdülmecid I initiated the Tanzimât period to reorganize the Ottoman Empire, but also to stem the rise of nationalism among its minorities. Ottomanism was a key goal of the Tanzimat, which was meant to unite all of the different peoples living in Ottoman territories, "Muslim and non-Muslim, Turkish and Greek, Armenian and Jewish, Kurd and Arab". For this purpose, Islamic law was put aside in favour of secular law. This policy officially began with the Edict of Gülhane, which declared equality before the law for both Muslim and non-Muslim Ottomans. Armenian nationalism was stagnant during these years, earning them the title of 'millet-i sadika' or the "loyal millet".

In 1863, Ottoman Armenians were introduced to a set of major reforms. The Armenian National Constitution codified the rights and privileges of the Armenian millet, but also introduced regulations defining the authority of the Patriarch. Also included was a new parliament: the Armenian National Assembly, which was seen as a milestone by progressive Armenians. Another development was the introduction of elementary education, colleges and other institutions of learning by Protestant missionaries. Armenian newspapers were founded. Armenian historians began writing the history of their people, which instilled a new sense of nationalism. This was part of an evolution in Armenian political consciousness from purely cultural romanticism to one which called a programme for action.

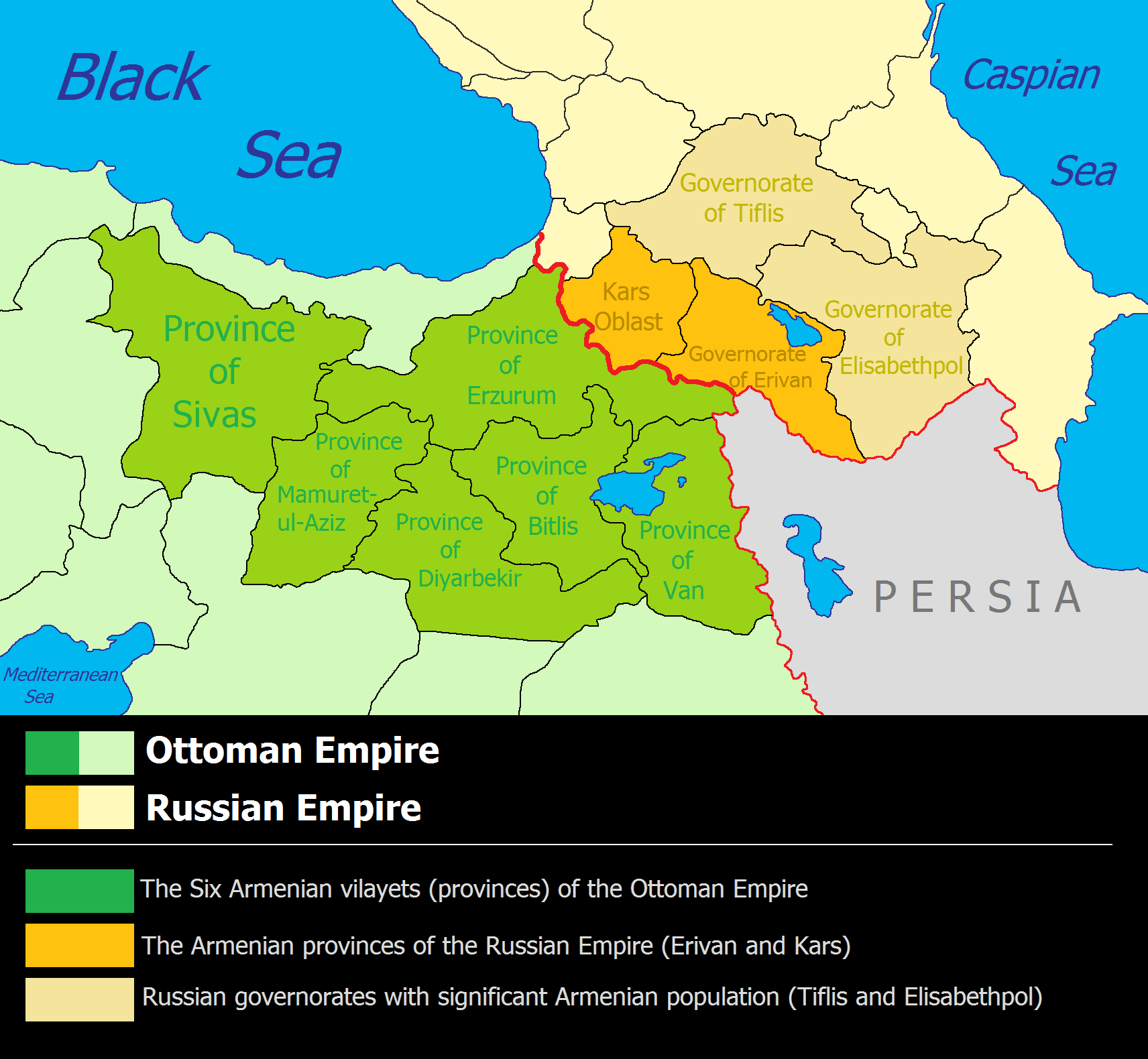
Re-establish an Armenian state in the Armenian Highland, controlled at the time by the Ottoman Empire and the Russian Empire.

1860 and onward, the number of Armenian schools, philanthropic and patriotic organizations multiplied in the Ottoman Empire. The initial aim of Protestant missionaries were the conversion of the Muslims and Jews, sought to convert Gregorian Armenians. The Armenian subjects of the Empire, influenced by the Armenian Diaspora, the network of congregations and schools of the Protestant missionaries throughout the Ottoman Empire, begin to rethink their position in the world. In 1872, the journalist Grigor Ardzruni said “Yesterday we were an ecclesiastical community, today we are patriots, tomorrow we will be a nation of workers and thinkers.” A parallel development occurred in Russian Armenia. Before 1840, Armenian journals were mainly in the hands of the clergy. This was changed. Along with the schools, the press played an important educational role and pointed the way to liberation. When Rev. William Goodell settled in Constantinople in 1831 to the end of World War I, the missionaries made considerable contributions to the education of Armenians. The European intellectual currents such as ideas of the French Revolution were transmitted through the 23,000 Armenian students within 127 Protestant congregations with 13,000 communicants, and 400 schools.

In the 1880s, Tsar Alexander II increased Russification to reduce the threat of future rebellions (Russia was populated by many minority groups). Tsar Alexander II attempted to prevent separatism. The Armenian language, schools were targeted. Russia wanted to replace these Russian schools and Russian educational materials.

The 1897 Russian Empire Census stated that 1,127,212 Armenians were in the Russian Lands (Erivan, 439,926; Elizavetpol, 298,790; Kars 72,967, Tiflis, 230,379, Baku, 52,770; Chernomorsk, 6,223 Daghestan, 1,652, Kutais, 24,505). At the same period (1896 Vital Cuinet) Armenians in the Ottoman Empire were 1,095,889 (Adana Vilayet, 97,450 Aleppo Vilayet, 37,999; Ankara Vilayet, 94,298; Bitlis Vilayet, 131,300; Bursa Vilayet, 88,991; Diyâr-ı Bekr Vilayet 67,718; Erzurum Vilayet, 134,967; İzmir Vilayet, 15,105; İzmit, 48,655; Kastamonu Vilayet, 2,647; Mamure-ul-Azil Vilayet, 79,128; Sivas Vilayet, 170,433; Trebizond Vilayet, 47,20; Van Vilayet, 79,998) There were many Armenians familiar with Russian customs. Russia, for Armenians, was also a path to Europe.

=== National Revival ===
Kagik Ozanyan claims that the Tanzimat helped the formation of an Armenian political strata and incited an Armenian national spirit. Armenian nationalists hoped to build their nation through a revolution, similar to the French Revolution. The Russian Consul General to Ottoman Empire, General Mayewski, recorded the following

The rebellion of Armenians resulted from the following three causes:
(1). Their known evolution in political matters (Issue of Civilizations),
(2). Development of ideas of nationalism, salvation and independence in Armenian opinion (Revolution Perspective),
(3). Supporting of these ideas by Western governments and publication through the inspiration and efforts of Armenian clerical men (Armenian Question).

The development of ideas of nationalism, salvation, and independence, established during the 19th century proved to be inspiring to Armenians. These concepts were first introduced to the Armenian national psyche when Armenian intelligentsia which had studied in Western Europe studied the French Revolution. They espoused a democratic-liberal ideology which rested on the rights of man. Another second wave come with the emergence of Russian revolutionary thought which by the end of the 19th century was Marxist and socialist. The Armenian Revolutionary Federation took inspiration from this source. However, the materialism and class struggle explained in Marxism did not neatly apply to the socioeconomics of Armenians in the Ottoman Empire as much as to those in Russian Armenia.

The discovery of Urartu has come to play a significant role in 19th and 20th-century Armenian nationalism.

=== Demographics of Armenians ===
The Six vilayets in the Ottoman Empire were largely populated by Armenians, while Erivan and Kars provinces were the main Armenian-populated provinces in the Russian Empire.

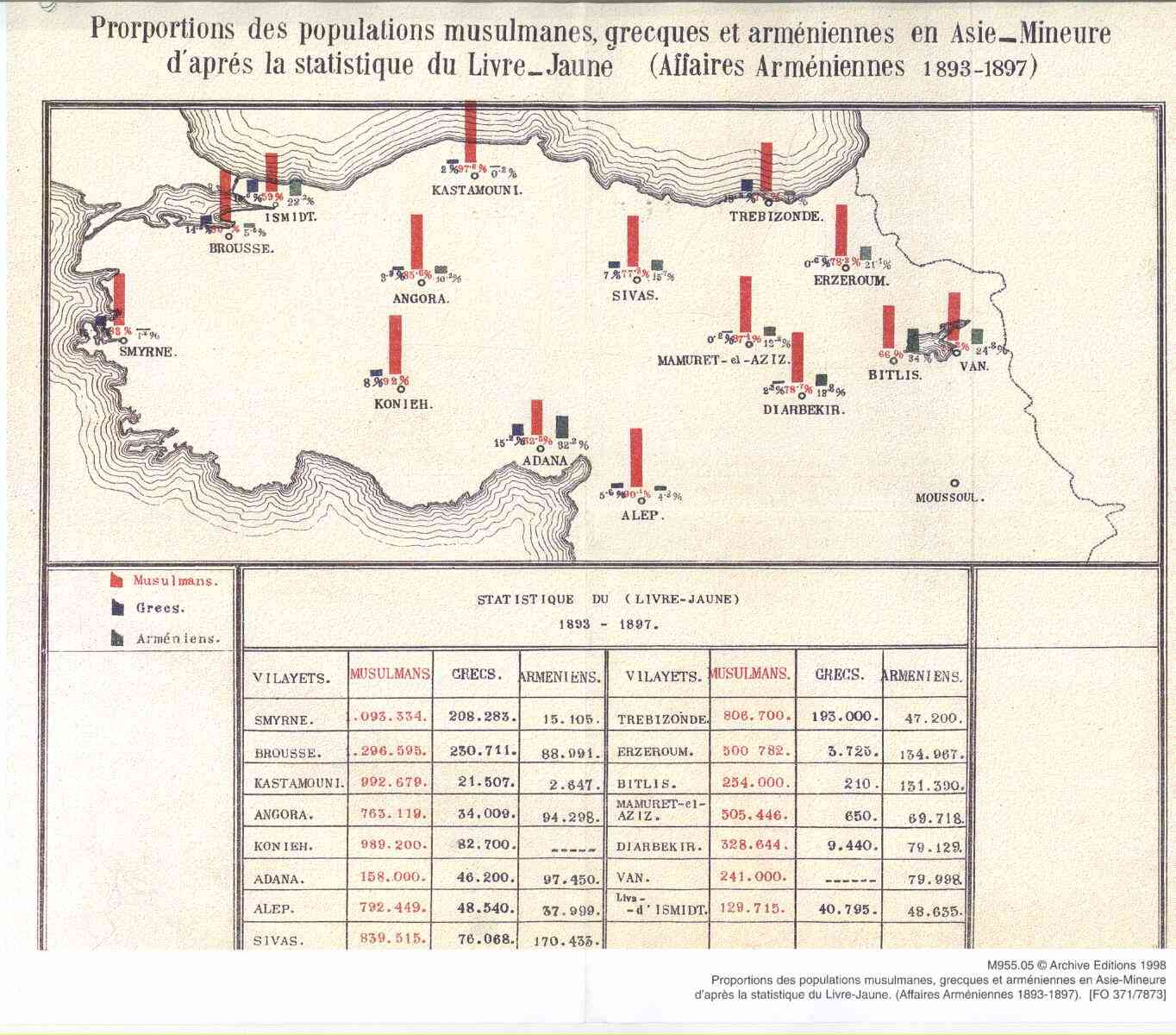
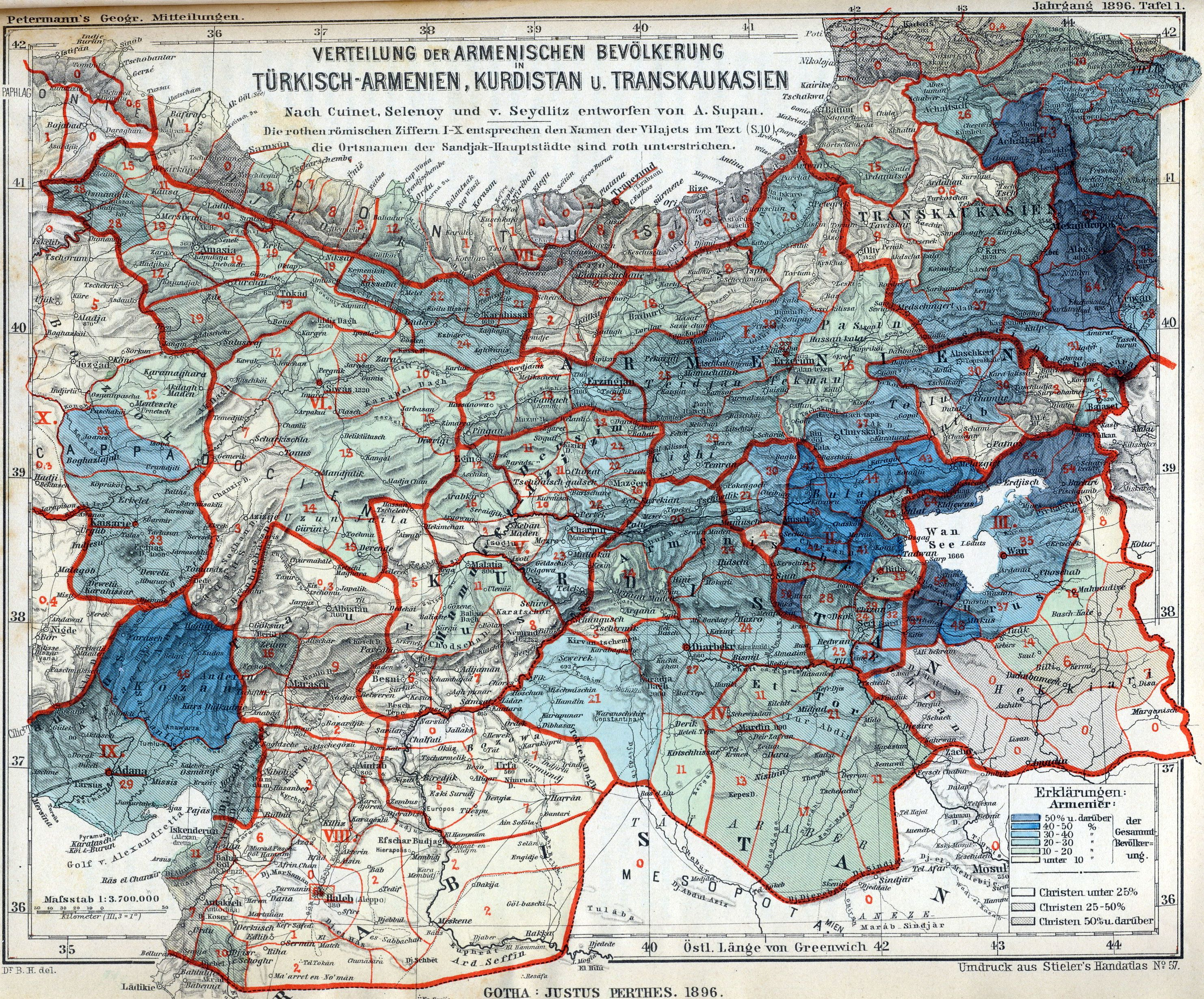
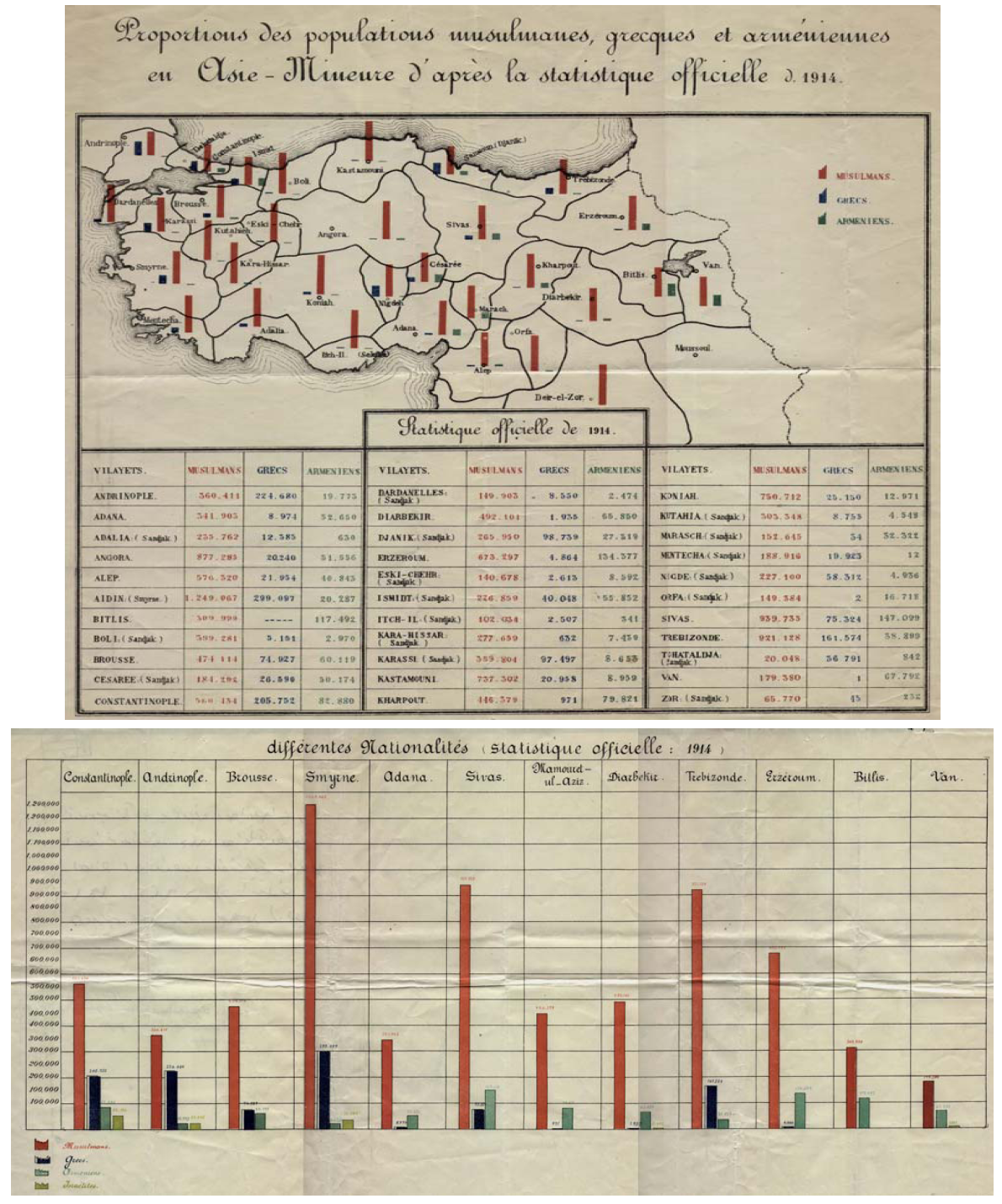
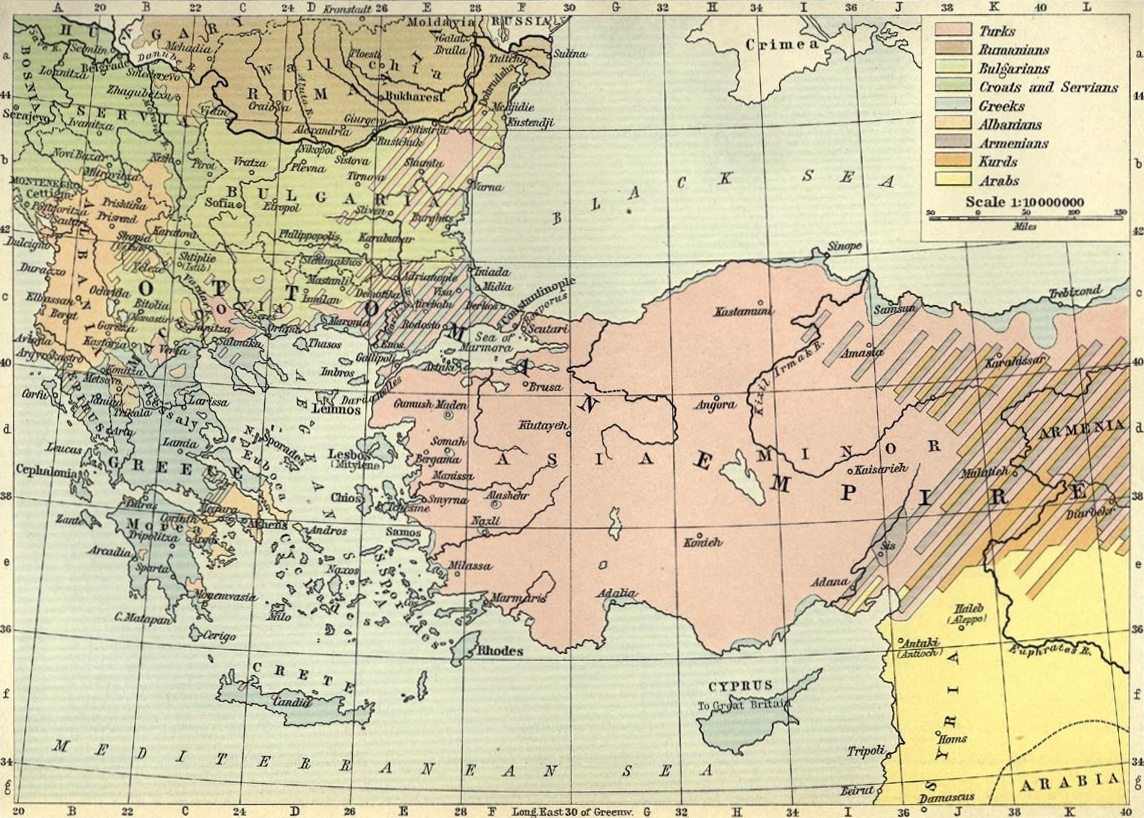
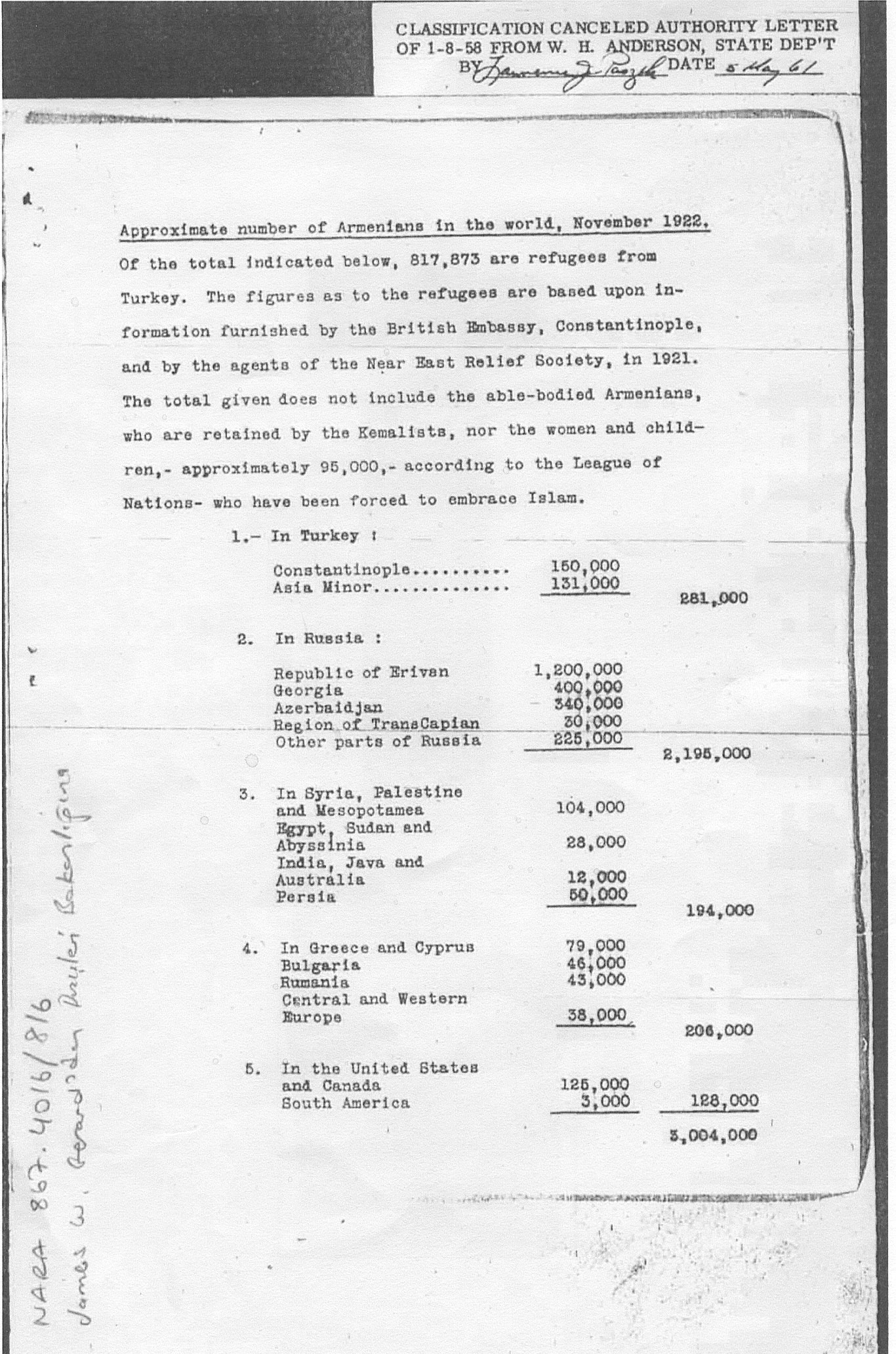
First two in the 1890s; second two in the 1910s, and last one in the 1920s

== Founding ==
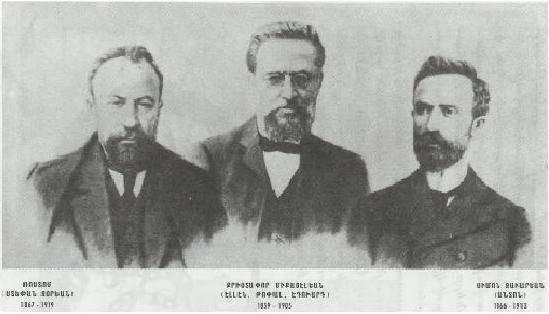
ARF: Stepan Zorian, Christapor Mikaelian, Simon Zavarian

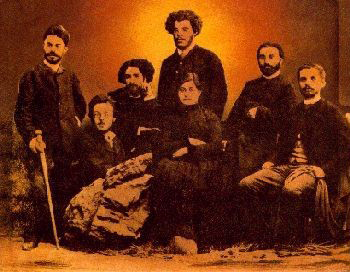
Hentchak: Avetis Nazarbekian, Mariam Vardanian, Gevorg Gharadjian, Ruben Khan-Azat, Christopher Ohanian, Gabriel Kafian and Manuel Manuelian

In the late 19th century, Armenian political organizations were founded, such as the Armenian Revolutionary Federation (Dashnak), the Social Democrat Hunchakian Party (Hunchak), and Armenakan (later known as Ramgavar). The organized Armenian activities traced back to an earlier known Armenian group, the "Union of Salvation," before the three major groups established themselves.

Protectors of the Fatherland was established as a secret society in Erzurum in 1881. Protectors of the Fatherland was almost certainly influenced by the ideas of the French and Greek Revolutions as 'Freedom or Death' was their motto. Members are organized into cells of ten, and only the leader had access to a central committee.

In 1885, the "Armenian Democratic Liberal Party" was established in Van by Mëkërtich Portukalian, who later went into exile in Marseille but kept in touch with local leaders, and published a journal of political and social enlightenment titled L'Armenie. The party's aim soon become to 'win for the Armenians the right to rule themselves, through revolution'. Their view on how to liberate Armenia from the Ottoman Empire was that it should be through the press, national awakening and unarmed resistance.

In 1887, the Social Democrat Hunchakian Party (Hunchak) was the first socialist party in the Ottoman Empire and Persia, founded by Avetis Nazarbekian, Mariam Vardanian, Gevorg Gharadjian, Ruben Khan-Azat, Christopher Ohanian, Gabriel Kafian and Manuel Manuelian, a group of college students who met in Geneva, Switzerland, with the goal to gain Armenia's independence from the Ottoman Empire. Hunchak means "Bell" in English, and was taken by party members to represent "awakening, enlightenment, and freedom." It was also the name of the party's main newspaper.

In 1889 the Young Armenia Society was founded by Kristapor Mikayelian in Tbilisi. The Young Armenia Society organised Fedayee campaigns into Ottoman territory. The Young Armenia Society organized an armed expedition to Ottoman Armenia with the Gugunian Expedition. Its aims were to carry out reprisals against Kurds persecuting Armenians in the Ottoman Empire. The society believed that the Russians would assist in the creation of an autonomous Armenian province under Russian rule.

In 1890 the Armenian Revolutionary Federation (“ARF” or Dashnaktsutiun or Dashnak) was founded in Tiflis. Its members armed themselves into fedayee groups to defend Armenian villages from widespread oppression, attacks, and persecution of the Armenians. It being seen as the only solution to save the people from Ottoman oppression and massacres. Its initial aim was to guarantee reforms in the Armenian provinces and to gain eventual autonomy. Throughout its history, the ARF is often accused of aiming to convince Western governments and diplomatic circles to sponsor the party's demands.

During 1880-1890 the local communication channels were developed. The organizations were fully functional under Ankara, Amasya, Çorum, Diyarbakır, Yozgat, and Tokat. In 1893 they began to post propaganda directed toward the non-Armenians. The main theme of the propaganda were that people should take control of their own life against the oppressors. The messaging did not affect Muslims. These activities ended with clashes between Armenian nationalists and Ottoman police, with many being arrested. Local authorities acted against them as they were cutting telegraph wires or bombing government buildings. Britain and the European powers concluded that if there would be more intervention the conflict would end with sectarian conflict, and a civil war would occur.

=== The Church ===
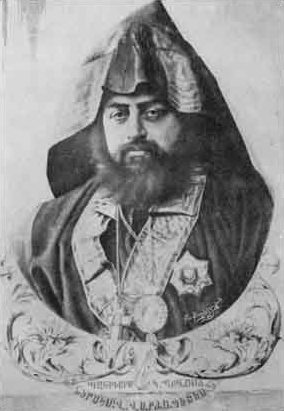
Nerses Varjabedian

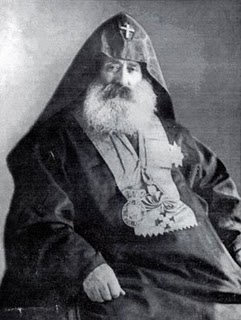
Mkrtich Khrimian

Armenian nationalism and the Armenian Apostolic Church has long been intertwined. The main voices of the movement were secular, as close to the turn of the century, Massis (published in Constantinople), the Hiusissapile and Ardzvi Vaspurkan (published in Van) became the main national organs (journals). These publications were secular. Major Armenian writers of the era, Mikael Nalbandian and Raphael Patkanian can be counted among the influential.

Beginning with 1863, Armenian Patriarch of Constantinople began to share their powers with the Armenian National Assembly, and their powers were limited by the Armenian National Constitution. They perceived the changes as erosion of their community. Armenian religious leaders played a key roles in the revolutionary movement. The Patriarch of Constantinople Mkrtich Khrimian was an important figure. Mkrtich Khrimian was transferred to Jerusalem in his later years, although this was actually an exile. Nerses II Varzhapetyan said "It is no longer possible for the Armenians and the Turks to live together..."

=== Russo-Turkish War of 1877–1878 ===
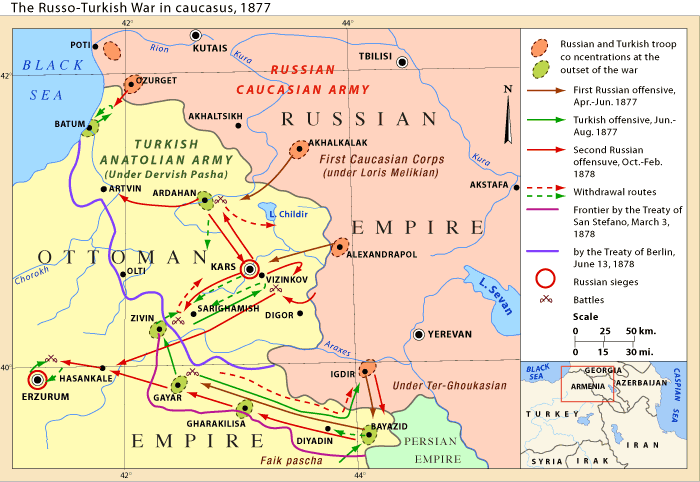
Russo-Turkish War (1877–78)

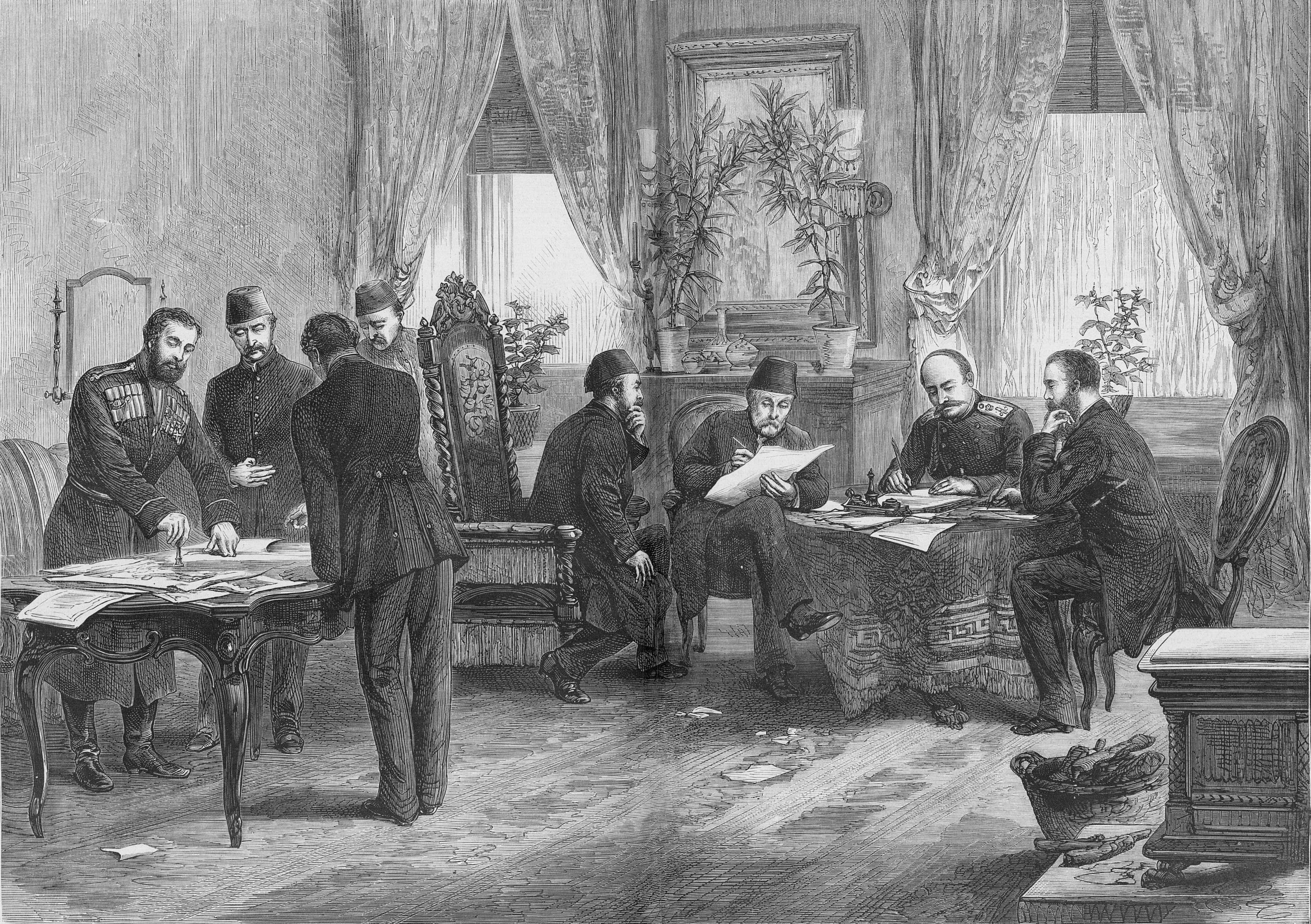
Negotiations for San Stefano Agreement included "Article 16"

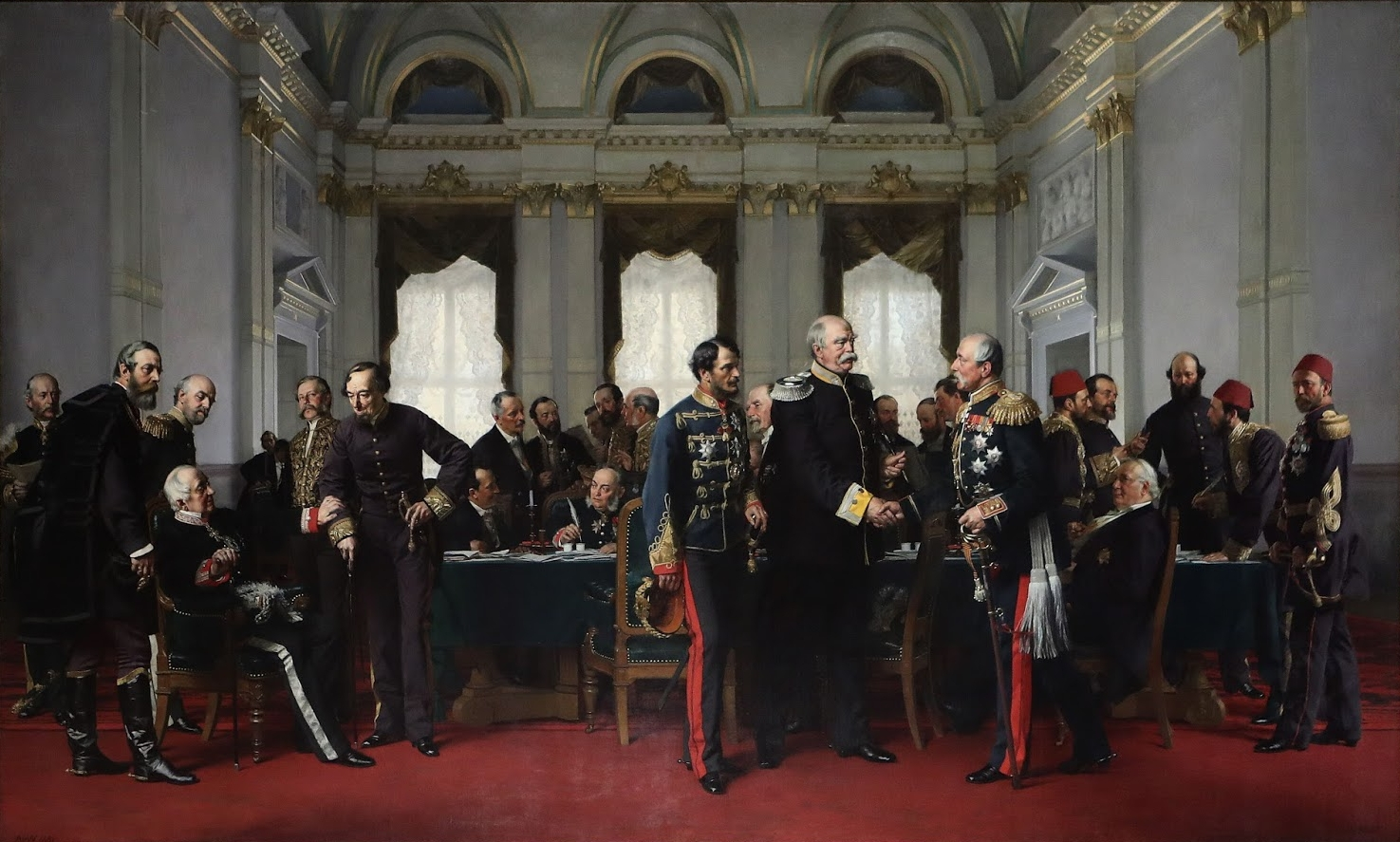
Congress of Berlin led to Treaty of Berlin (1878) which included "Article 61"

Beginning in the mid-19th century, the Great Powers took issue with the Empire's treatment of its Christian minorities and increasingly pressured extend equal rights to all its citizens. Following the violent suppression of the Herzegovina uprising, the Bulgarian April Uprising and the Serbian Kumanovo uprising in 1875, the Great Powers invoked the 1856 Treaty of Paris by claiming that it gave them the right to intervene and protect the Ottoman Empire's Christian minorities.

The Armenian patriarchate of Constantinople, Nerses II (1874–1884), forwarded Armenian complaints of widespread "forced land seizure ... forced conversion of women and children, arson, protection extortion, rape, and murder" to the Powers. March 1878, after the conclusion of the 1877–78 Russo-Turkish War, the Armenians began to look more toward the Russian Empire as the ultimate guarantors of their security. Patriarch Nerses approached the Russian leadership during the negotiations with the Ottomans in San Stefano and convinced them to insert a clause, Article 16, to the Treaty of San Stefano, stipulating that the Russian forces occupying the Armenian-populated provinces in the eastern Ottoman Empire would withdraw only with the full implementation of reforms.

In June 1878, Great Britain was troubled with Russia's powerful position in the Treaty and forced the parties for a new negotiations with the convening of the Congress of Berlin. Article 61 of the Treaty of Berlin contained the same text as Article 16 but removed any mention that Russian forces would remain in the provinces. Instead, the Ottoman government was periodically to inform the Great Powers of the progress of the reforms. The Armenian National Assembly and Patriarch Nerses II sent Catholicos Mgrdich Khrimian to present the case for the Armenians at Berlin; in his famous speech (following the Berlin negotiations) “The Paper Ladle,” Mgrdich Khrimian advised Armenians to take the national awakening of Bulgaria as a model for self-determination which was ignored by the European community of nations.

In 1880, British Prime Minister William Gladstone declared that “To serve Armenia is to serve the Civilization." The great powers sent to the Porte an “Identic Note” which asked for the enforcement of the Article 61. This followed on January 2, 1881, with a British Circular on Armenia to other Powers. However Armenian nationalists had discovered that neither Tsar Alexander II's idealism nor Gladstone's liberalism were dependable allies.

=== Armenian diaspora ===
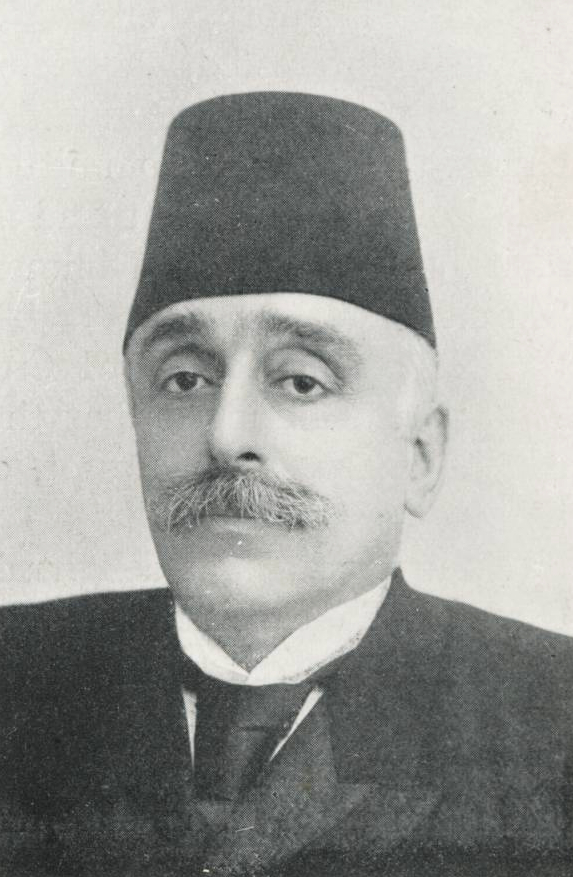
Boghos Nubar chairman of the Armenian National Delegation and one of the founder of the AGBU.

Significant European and American movements began with the Armenian diaspora in France and in the United States as early as in the 1890s.

In 1885, the Armenian Patriotic Society of Europe was established in London. Its goal was that the Armenian diaspora should help those in their native land, both financially and raise Armenian political consciousness about its subject condition. Various political parties and benevolent unions, such as branches for the Armenian Revolutionary Federation, the Social-Democrat Henchagian party, and the Armenian General Benevolent Union (AGBU) which was initially founded in Constantinople, were established wherever there was a considerable number of Armenians.

== Activities (Ottoman Empire) ==
Conflicts during the Hamidian Era

=== Hamidian Era ===
The emergence of the Armenian National Movement in the early 1880s and the armed struggle by the late 1880s coincides with Sultan Abdul Hamid II's reign (1876-1909). Abdul Hamid II oversaw an autocracy while ruling over a period of decline of the empire.

==== Capitol ====
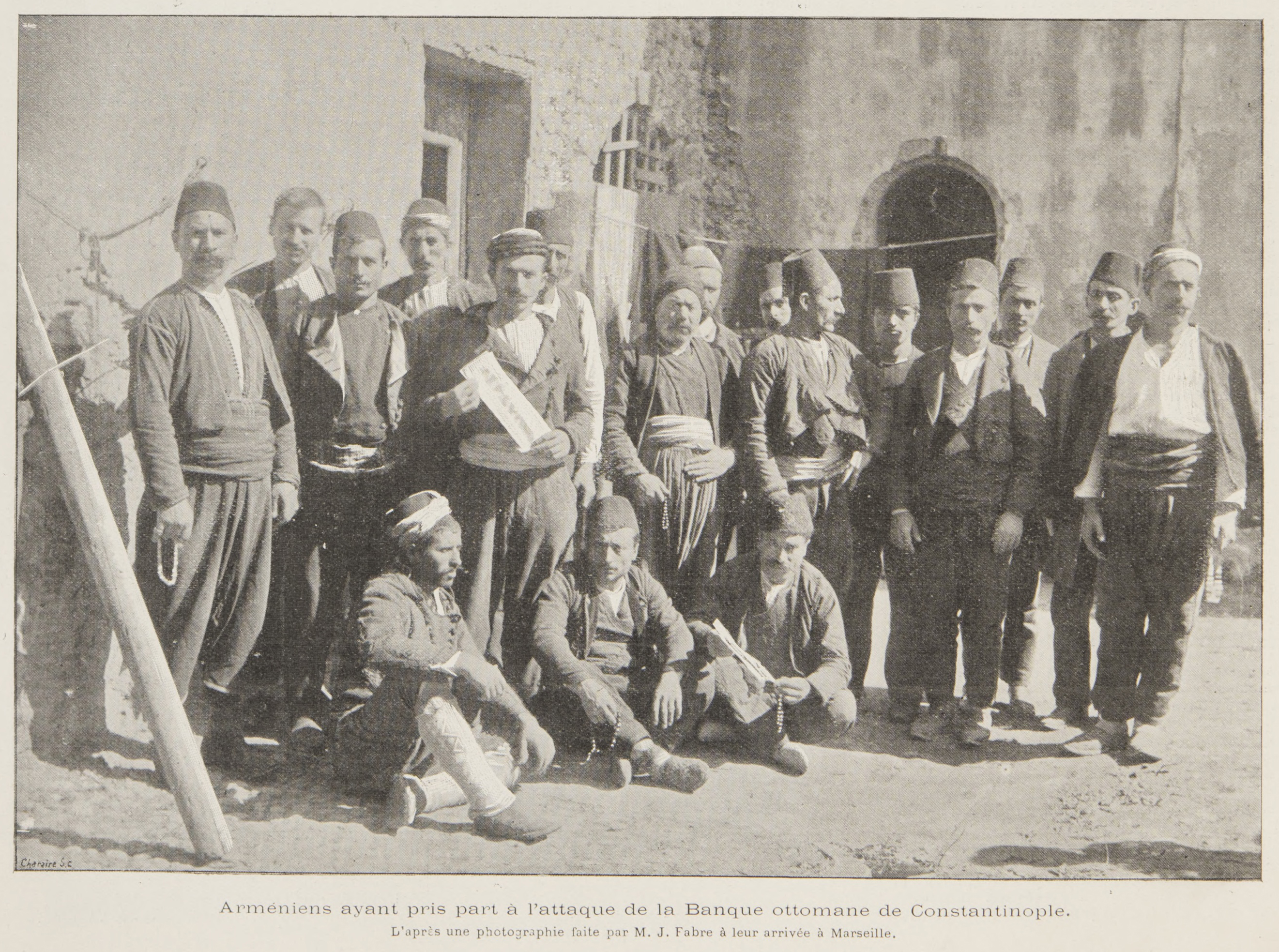
Survivors of the Ottoman Bank takeover group after they arrived in Marseille.

The Kum Kapu demonstration occurred in the Kumkapı district of Constantinople on July 27, 1890. The Hunchaks concluded that the demonstrations at Kum Kapu were unsuccessful. Similars demonstration on a lesser scale followed throughout most of the 1890s.

The ARF undertook the 1896 Ottoman Bank Takeover, seizing the Ottoman Bank in Constantinople, on 26 August 1896. In an effort to raise further awareness in Europe regarding the pogroms and massacres instigated by the Sultan Abdul Hamid II, 28 armed men and women led by Papken Siuni and Karekin Pastirmaciyan (Armen Karo) took over the bank which largely employed European personnel from Great Britain and France.

The Yıldız assassination attempt was a failed assassination attempted on Abdul Hamid II by the ARF at Yıldız Mosque on July 21, 1905.

==== Lake Van Region ====
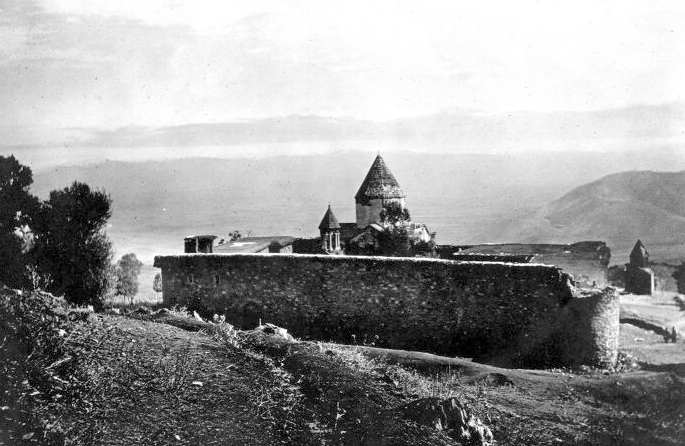
Battle of Holy Apostles Monastery

Van turned into a center of Armenian Nationalist activity, as Lake Van borders Russia and Persia, making assistance easily accessible.

In May 1889, the Bashkale Clash Ottoman gendarme stopped three Armenakan members which they believed were members of a large revolutionary apparatus, two of whom were subsequently killed. The incident increased sectarian tensions and other conflicts occurred.

During the Hamidian Massacres in 1896, the Defense of Van saw the Armenian population in Van defend against Ottoman forces and Kurdish tribesmen. The Khanasor Expedition was the Armenian militia's response.

The Battle of Holy Apostles Monastery was an armed conflict of the Armenian militia in Holy Apostles Monastery near Mush, in November 1901. Andranik Ozanian's intentions were to attract the attention of the foreign consuls at Mush to the plight of the Armenian peasants and to provide hope for the oppressed Armenians of the eastern provinces.

==== Diyarbekir/Aleppo Vilayets ====
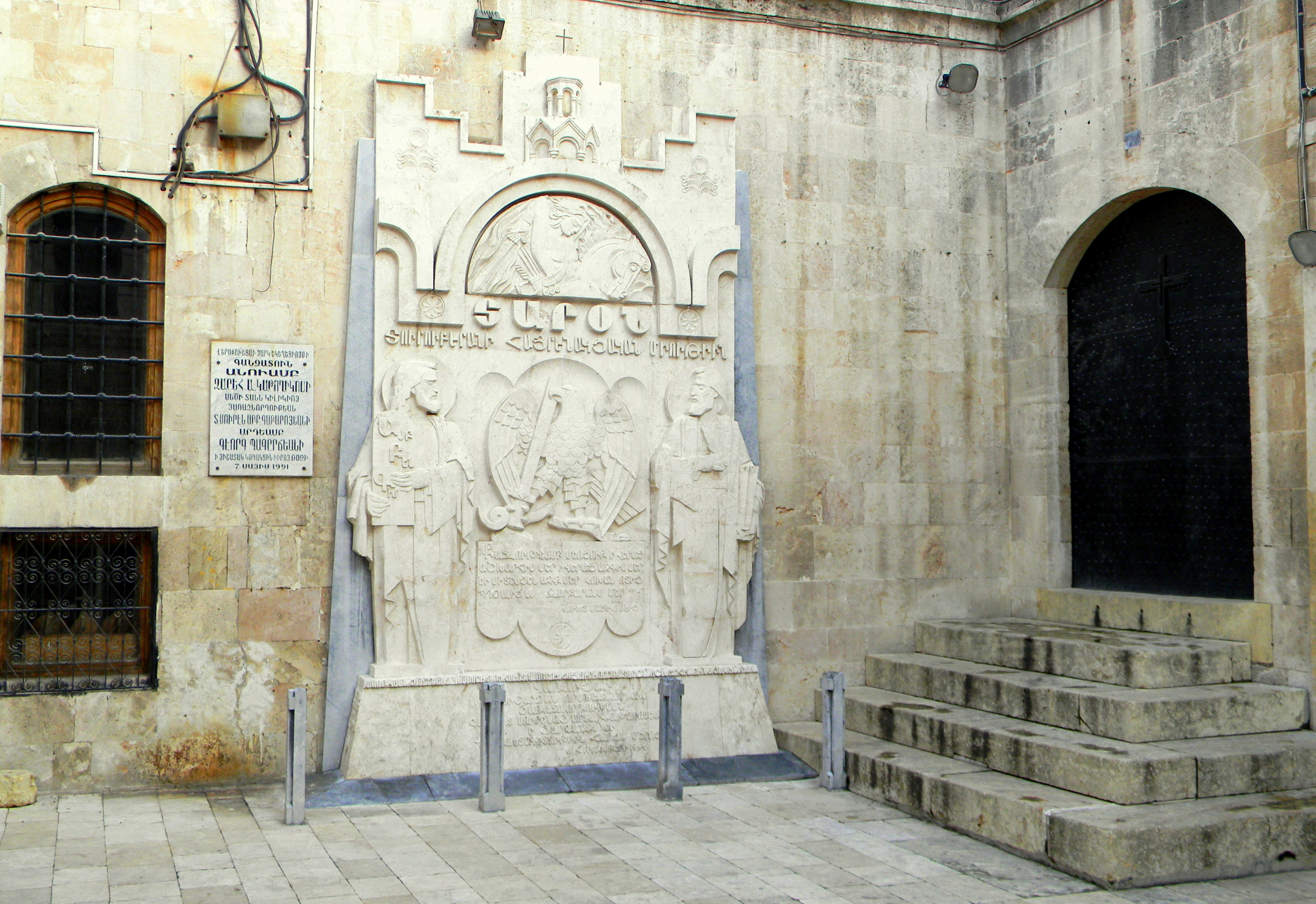
Armenian Cathedral of the Forty Martyrs, Aleppo

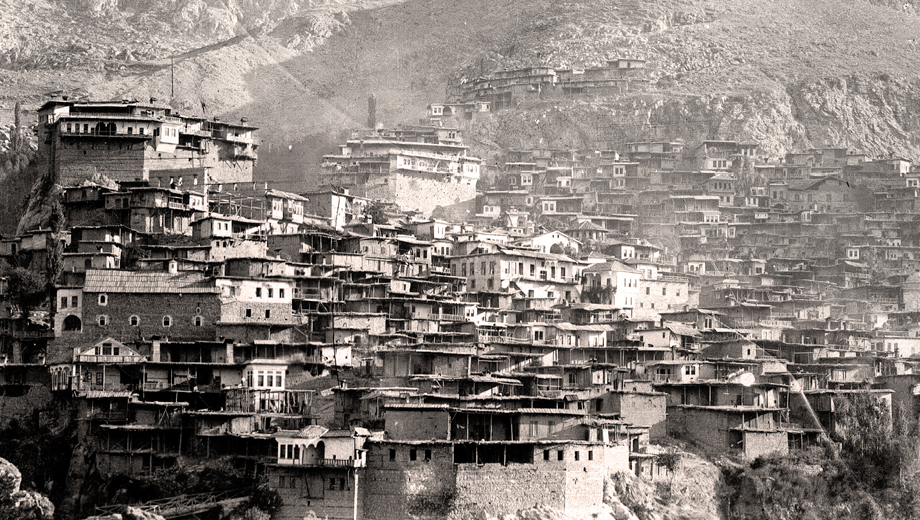
Zeytun

Sason was formerly part of the sanjak of Siirt which was in Diyarbakır vilayet of the Ottoman Empire, later part of Batman Province of Turkey. Zeitun was formerly part of the Aleppo Vilayet of the Ottoman Empire, later Süleymanlı in the Kahramanmaraş Province of Turkey. The Social Democrat Hunchakian Party and the ARF were active in the region.

The Armenians of Zeitun had historically enjoyed a period of high autonomy in the Ottoman Empire until the nineteenth century. In the first half of the nineteenth century, the central government decided to bring this region of the empire under tighter control. This strategy ultimately proved ineffective. In the First Zeitun resistance, in the summer of 1862, the Ottomans sent a military contingent of 12,000 men to Zeitun to reassert government control. The force, however, was held at bay by the Armenians and, through French mediation, the first Zeitun resistance was brought to a close. The Zeitun Armenians gave inspiration to the ideas of creating an Armenian state in Cilicia.

The Sasun resistance of 1894 was the resistance of the Hunchak militia of the Sasun region. The region continued to be in conflict between the fedayee and the Muslim Ottomans between the local Armenian villages.

Between the years 1891 and 1895, activists from the Armenian Social Democrat Hunchakian Party visited Cilicia, and established a new branch in Zeitun. Another Zeitun Rebellion took place in 1895.

In spring 1902, a representative of the ARF, Vahan Manvelyan, was sent to in Sason with the purpose of mediating peace, but ended up irritating the Muslims. In February 1903, at the Third ARF Congress in Sofia, it was decided send committeemen to Sasun. Hrayr Dzhoghk went to Van, where he organized in Sasun. Alongside Hrayr Dzhoghk was Andranik. Andranik became the main organizer and head of the Sasun Uprising of 1904. Hrayr Dzhoghk was killed on April 13 in the village Gelieguzan. He was buried in a court of a local church near to Serob Paşa.

==== Armenian reform program ====
While the Armenian national liberation movement was in its early stage; lack of outside support and inability to maintain a trained, organized Kurdish force diminished Kurdish aspirations for autonomy. However, two prominent Kurdish tribes mounted opposition to the empire, based more from an ethno-nationalistic standpoint. The Badrkhans were secessionists while the Sayyids of Nihiri were autonomists. The Russo-Turkish War of 1877-78 was followed (1880–1881) by the attempt of Shaykh Ubaydullah of Nihri to found an "independent Kurd principality" around the Ottoman-Persian border (including the Van Vilayet) where the Armenian population was significant. Shaykh Ubaydullah of Nihri gathered 20,000 fighters. Lacking discipline, his man left the ranks after pillaging and acquiring riches from the villages in the region (indiscriminately, including Armenian villages). Shaykh Ubaydullah was captured by Ottoman forces in 1882 and his movement ended.

===== Security, Reform, Order =====
The Kurds sacked neighboring towns and villages with impunity. The central assumption of the Hamidiye system that Kurdish tribes could be brought under military discipline—proved to be impossible. The Persian Cossack Brigade later proved that it could function as independent unit, but the Ottoman example, which it was modeled after, never replaced the tribal loyalty to Ottoman Sultan or even to its establishing unit. The Hamidiye corps or Hamidiye Light Cavalry Regiments were well-armed, irregular, majority Kurdish cavalry (minor amounts of other nationalities, such as Turcoman) formations that operated in the eastern provinces of the Ottoman Empire. They were intended to be modeled after the Caucasian Cossack Regiments (example Persian Cossack Brigade) and were primarily tasked to patrol the Russo-Ottoman frontier and secondly, to reduce the potential of Kurdish-Armenian cooperation. The Hamidiye Cavalry was in no way a cross-tribal force, despite their military appearance, organization, and potential. Hamidiye quickly find out that they could only be tried through a military court martial They became immune to civil administration. Realizing their immunity, they turned their tribes into “legalized robber brigades” as they steal grain, reap fields not of their possession, drive off herds, and openly steal from shopkeepers. Kurdish chieftains also taxed the population of the region in sustaining these units, and Armenians perceived this tax as exploitation. The Hamidiye cavalry harassed and assaulted Armenians.

The Hamidian massacres were brought to an end through mediation by the Great Powers. However instead of Armenian autonomy in these regions, Kurdish tribal chiefs retained much of their autonomy and power. Abdul Hamid made little attempt to alter the traditional Kurdish power structure. The sultan entrusted the Kurds to safeguard the southern and eastern fringe of the empire and its mountainous topography, limited transportation, and communication system. The state had little access to these provinces and were forced to make informal agreements with tribal chiefs, for instance the Ottoman qadi and mufti did not have jurisdiction over religious law which bolstered Kurdish authority and autonomy.

At the 1907 Battle of Sulukh, Kevork Chavush was critically wounded on May 25, 1907, during a large firefight with the Ottoman army in Sulukh, Mush. Kevork Chavush escaped the fighting. Two days later his body was found in Kyosabin-Bashin on May 27 under a bridge.

In 1908, after the Young Turk Revolution, the Hamidiye Cavalry was disbanded as an organized force, but as they were “tribal forces” before official recognition, they stayed as “tribal forces” after dismemberment. The Hamidiye Cavalry is described as a military disappointment and a failure because of its contribution to tribal feuds.

==== Abdul Hamid II's position ====
Sultan Abdul Hamid II wanted to reinforce the territorial integrity the Ottoman Empire, and asserted Pan-Islamism as a state ideology. Abdul Hamid II perceived the Ottoman Armenians to be an extension of foreign powers, a means by which Europe could "get at our most vital places and tear out our very guts."

=== Second Constitutional Era ===
The Armenians, especially the ARF, supported the Young Turk Revolution. With the revolution began the Second Constitutional Era, which proved difficult to reinstill Ottomanism among its subjects.

The ARF, a Marxist-socialist organization previously outlawed, became the main representative of the Armenian community in the Ottoman Empire, replacing the pre-1908 Armenian elite, which had been composed of merchants, artisans, and clerics who had seen their future in obtaining more privileges within the bounds of Ottomanism. During the same time the ARF was moving out of this context and developing the concept of an independent Armenian state. With this national transformation the ARF's activities become a national cause.

Once in power, the Committee of Union and Progress (CUP) introduced a number of new initiatives intended to promote the modernization of the Ottoman Empire. The CUP advocated a program of reform under a strong central government, as well as the reducing foreign influence. CUP promoted industrialization and administrative reforms. Administrative reforms of provincial administration quickly led to a higher degree of centralization.

==== Armenian Nationalism in the Ottoman parliament ====
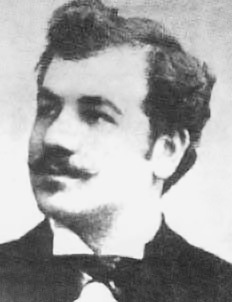
Karekin Pastermadjian, ARF deputy of the Chamber of Deputies from Erzurum during the Second Constitutional Era

The 1908 Ottoman general election resulted in a new parliament composed of 142 Turks, 60 Arabs, 25 Albanians, 23 Greeks, 12 Armenians (including four from ARF and two from Hunchaks), 5 Jews, 4 Bulgarians, 3 Serbs and 1 Vlach. The CUP could count on the support of about 60 deputies and formed a government.

Karekin Pastermadjian of the ARF became an MP. During his four years as a deputy, he worked for the railroad bill. Its purpose was to build railroads in the vilayets which were considered to be Russia's future possessions. For that reason neither France nor Germany wished to undertake it. Another fundamental object was to build those lines with American capital, which would make it possible to counteract the Russo-Franco-German policies and financial intrigues. But in spite of all efforts he was unable to overcome the German opposition, although, as the outcome of the struggle in connection with that bill, two ministers of public works were forced to resign their posts.

===== Balkans =====
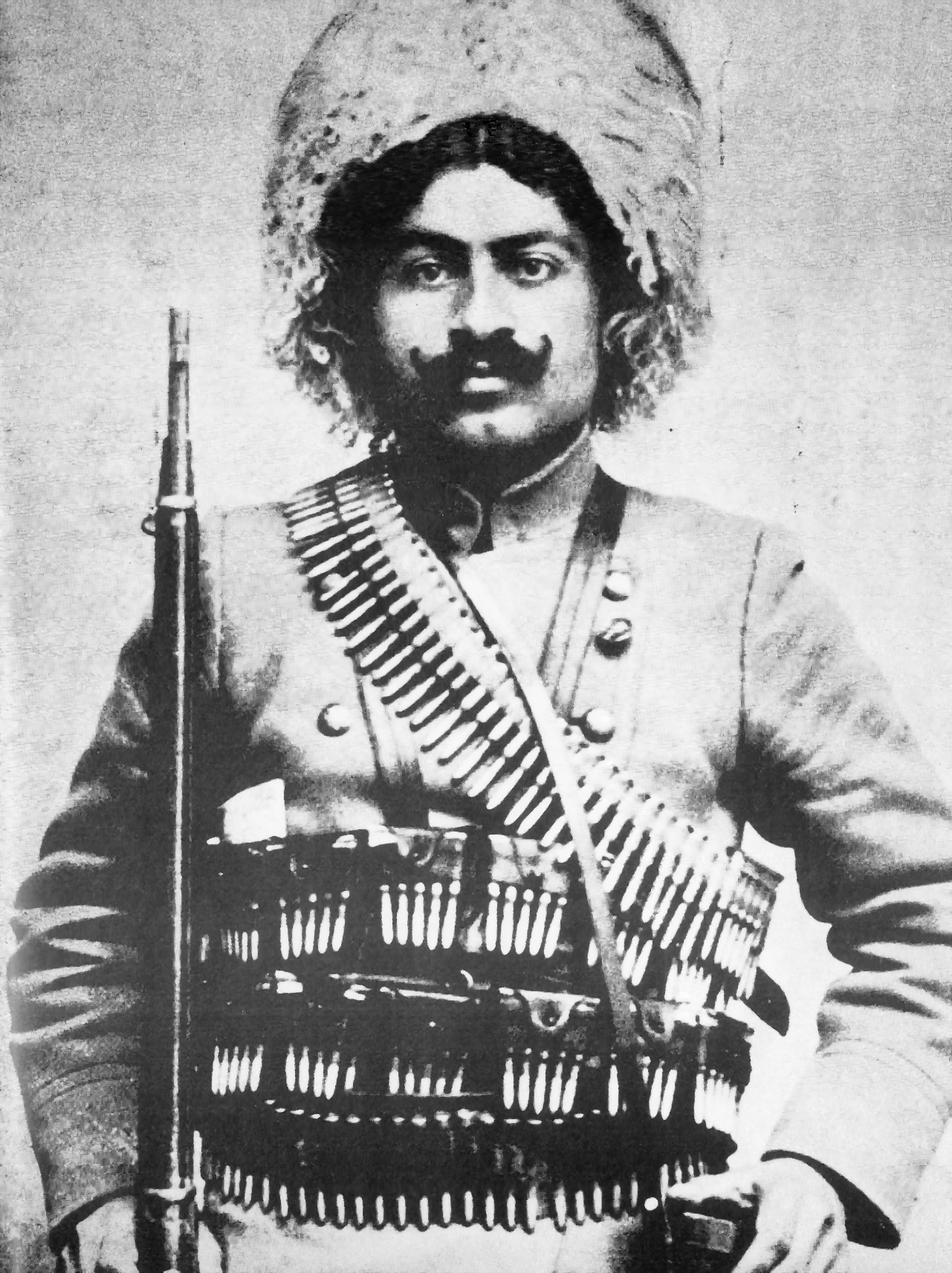
1913, Garegin Njdeh

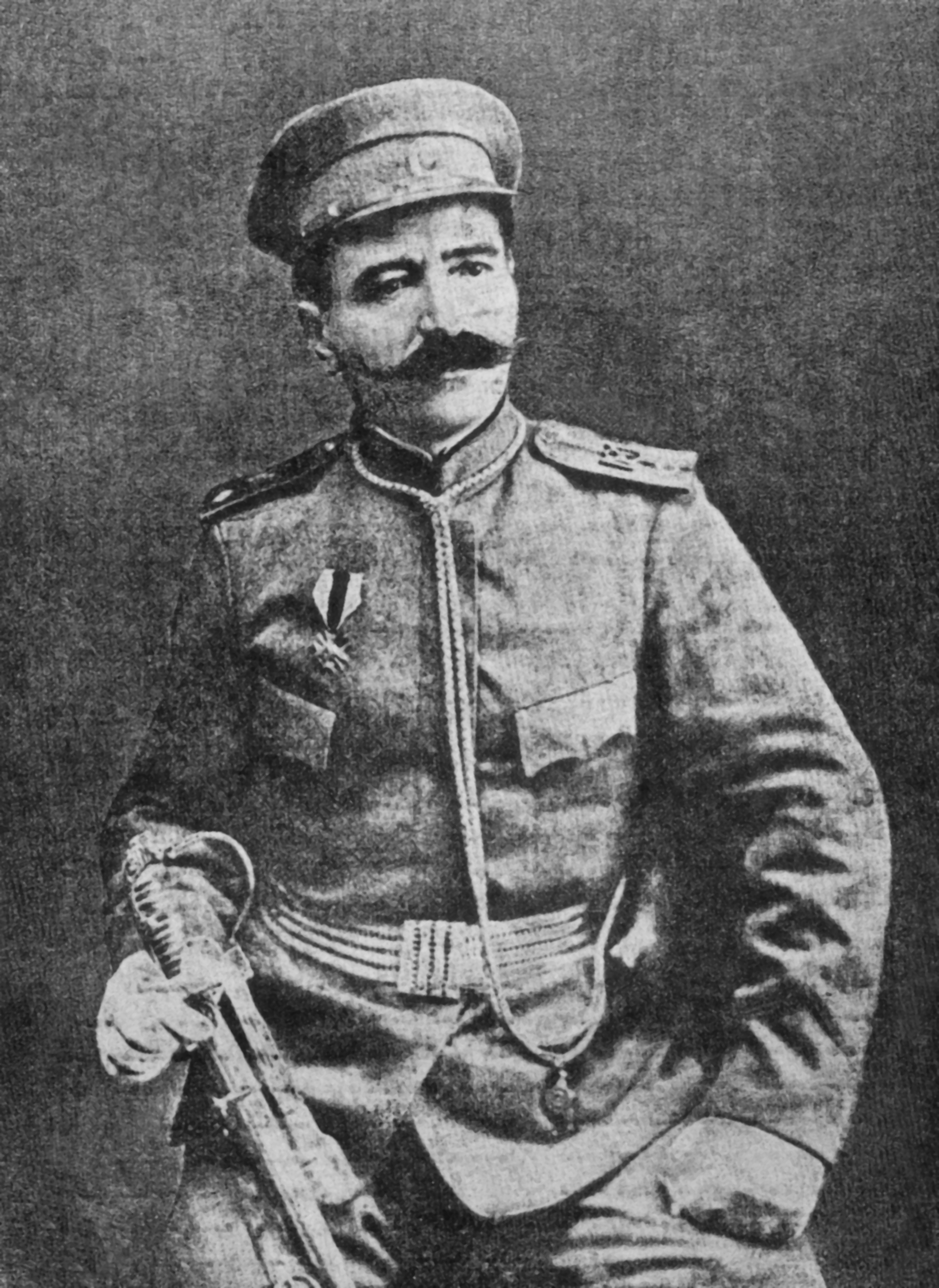
1912, Zoravar Andranik

At the time of the Balkan Wars (1912–1913) around 35,000 Armenians lived in Bulgaria.

Andranik participated in the Balkan Wars in the Bulgarian army, alongside general Garegin Nzhdeh, as a commander of Armenian auxiliary troops. Andranik met revolutionist Boris Sarafov in Sofia and the two pledged themselves to work jointly for the oppressed peoples of Armenia and Macedonia. Andranik participated in the First Balkan War alongside Nzhdeh as a Chief Commander of 12th Battalion of Lozengrad Third Brigade of the Macedonian-Adrianopolitan militia under the command of Colonel Aleksandar Protogerov. His detachment consisted of 273 Armenian volunteers, which was more than half of the 531 non-Macedonian born fighters in the group.

On October 20, the Macedonian-Adrianopolitan militia and Andranik's volunteer detachment, participated in the Siege of Adrianople. On November 4, 1912, the Macedonian-Adrianopolitan militia with the support of Andranik's volunteer detachment defeated a numerically superior Turkish force near Momchilgrad.

==== The reform package ====
The politics in Constantinople was centered around trying to find a solution to the demands of Arab and Armenian reformist groups. With most of the Christian population outside of the Empire after the Balkan Wars, Islamism became central to the Ottoman official ideology.

In 1913, Karekin Pastermadjian took part in conferences held for the consideration of the Armenian reforms. He was in Paris and the Netherlands, as the delegate of the ARF, to meet the inspectors general who were invited to carry out the reforms.

The Armenian reform package was signed in February 1914. L. C. Westenenk, an administrator for the Dutch East Indies, and Major Hoff, a major in the Norwegian Army, were selected as the first two inspectors. Hoff was in Van when World War I broke out, just as Westenenk was preparing to depart for his post in Erzerum.

On December 16, 1914, the Ottoman Empire dismantled the Armenian reform package, just after the first engagement of the Caucasus Campaign in the Bergmann Offensive. The Tsar visited the Caucasus front on December 30, 1914, telling the head of the Armenian Church that "a most brilliant future awaits the Armenians".

== Activities (Russian Empire) ==
=== Edict on Armenian church property 1903-1904 ===
Russification programme reached its peak with the decree of June 12, 1903, confiscating the property of the Armenian Church drawing the ire of the Armenians. When the Tsar refused to back down the Armenians turned to the ARF. The Armenian clergy had previously been wary of the ARF, condemning their socialism as anti-clerical. However, the ARF previously acquired support and sympathy in the Russian administration. This was mainly due to the ARF's attitude toward the Ottoman Empire, and the party enjoyed the support of the central Russian administration, as tsarist and ARF foreign policy had the same alignment until 1903. The edict on Armenian church property was faced by strong ARF opposition, because it now perceived the Russian government a threat to Armenian national existence. In 1904, a Dashnak congress specifically extended their programme to support the rights of Armenians in the Russian Empire as well as Ottoman Turkey.

As a result, the ARF leadership decided to actively defend Armenian churches. The ARF formed a Central Committee for Self-Defence in the Caucasus and organised a series of protests. At Gandzak the Russian army responded by firing into the crowd, killing ten, and further demonstrations were met with more bloodshed. The Dashnaks and Hunchaks began a campaign of assassination against tsarist officials in Transcaucasia and they succeeded in wounding Prince Golitsin. The events convinced Tsar Nicholas that he must reverse his policies. He replaced Golitsin with the Armenophile governor Count Illarion Ivanovich Vorontsov-Dashkov and returned the property of the Armenian Church. Gradually order was restored and the Armenian bourgeoisie once more began to distance itself from the revolutionary nationalists.

=== Armenian-Azeri massacres 1904-1905 ===
Unrest in Transcaucasia, which also included major strikes, reached a climax during the 1905 Russian Revolution. 1905 saw a wave of mutinies, strikes and peasant uprisings across imperial Russia and events in Transcaucasia were particularly violent. In Baku, the centre of the Russian oil industry, class tensions mixed with ethnic rivalries. The city was almost wholly composed of Azeris and Armenians, but the Armenian middle-class tended to have a greater share in the ownership of the oil companies and Armenian workers generally had better salaries and working conditions than the Azeris. The Bakuvian governor, Prince Mikhail Nakashidze, was murdered by an ARF bomb in May of that year. In December 1904, after a major strike was declared in Baku, the two communities clashed on the streets and the violence spread to the countryside.

=== Tribune of People, 1912 ===
In January 1912, a total of 159 Armenians were charged with membership of a "Revolutionary" organisation. During the revolution Armenian revolutionaries were split into "Old Dashnaks", allied with the Kadets and "Young Dashnaks" aligned with the SRs. To determine the position of Armenians all forms of the Armenian national movement was put onto trial. When the tribune finished its work, 64 charges were dropped and the rest were either imprisoned or exiled for varying periods

== Activities during World War I ==
Beginning at the end of July and ending on August 2, 1914, the Armenian congress at Erzurum was a watershed event between the Ottoman government of the CUP and Ottoman Armenian citizens. Coming soon after the passage of the Armenian reform package, a conversation between these groups were established with the Armenian liaisons Simon Vratsian, Arshak Vramian, Rostom (Stepan Zorian), and E. Aknouni (Khatchatour Maloumian) and Ottoman liaisons Dr. Behaeddin Shakir, Ömer Naji, and Hilmi Bey, also accompanied by an international entourage of peoples from the Caucasus. The CUP requested that Ottoman Armenians assist in an Ottoman military campaign into Transcaucasia by inciting a rebellion (with the Russian Armenians) against the tsarist army. The Ottoman plan was to draw the Persians, Kurds, Tatars and Georgians into a holy war against the Allies. They offered the Ottoman Armenians autonomy if they supported the war plan. The Tsar also promised autonomy for Russian Armenia. A representative meeting of Russian Armenians assembled in Tiflis, Caucasus, during August 1914. The Tsar promised autonomy to six Turkish Armenian vilayets as well as the two Russian-Armenian provinces. Tsar asked Armenian's loyalty and support for Russia in the conflict. The proposal was agreed upon and nearly 20,000 Armenians, Armenian volunteer units, served with the Russian colors. The Armenians were quite willing to remain loyal to their government, but declared their inability to agree to the other proposal, that of inciting their compatriots under Russian rule to insurrection. In spite of these promises and threats, the executive committee of the ARF informed the Turks that the Armenians could not accept the Turkish proposal, and on advised the Turks not to participate in the present war, which would be very disastrous to the Turks themselves.

=== Armed movement ===
==== 1914-1915 ====
The Russian Armenian Volunteer Corps was a military fighting unit within the Imperial Russian Army. Composed of several groups at battalion strength, its ranks were exclusively made up of Armenians from the Russian Empire, though there were also a number of Armenian from the Ottoman Empire. In August 1914, following Germany's declaration of war against Russia, Count Illarion Vorontsov-Dashkov, the Russian viceroy of the Caucasus, approached Armenian leaders in the Tiflis to broach the idea of a formation of a separate fighting corps. His offer was received warmly and within a few weeks Armenian volunteers began to enlist. Responsibility for its formation was given to a special committee created by the Armenian National Council, which coordinated its activities from Tiflis, Yerevan and Alexandrapol.

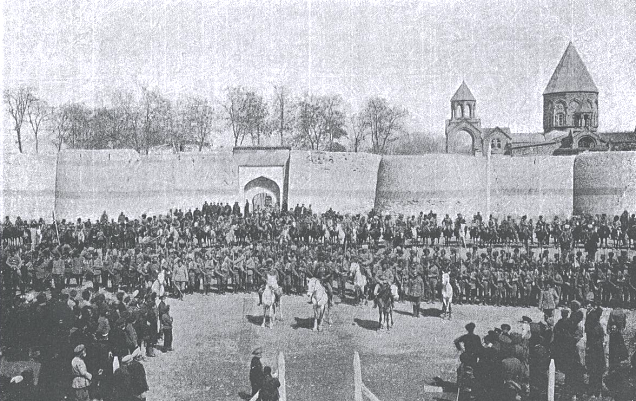
3rd Battalion Volunteers

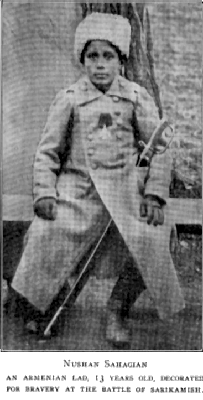
Volunteer at Sarikamish

The Battle of Sarikamish took place from December 22, 1914, to January 17, 1915, as part of the Caucasus Campaign. The Ottomans employed a strategy which demanded that their troops be highly mobile and to arrive at specified objectives at precise times. Along the Kars Oblast, the 3rd battalion commanded by Hamazasp Srvandztian and 4th battalion by Keri (Arshak Gavafian) operated on the front facing Erzurum between Sarikamish and Oltu. 4th battalion of the Armenian volunteers engaged at Barduz Pass. The Ottoman army suffered a delay of 24 hours in the Barduz Pass, and 4th battalion of the Armenian volunteers lost 600 troops in a battle there.

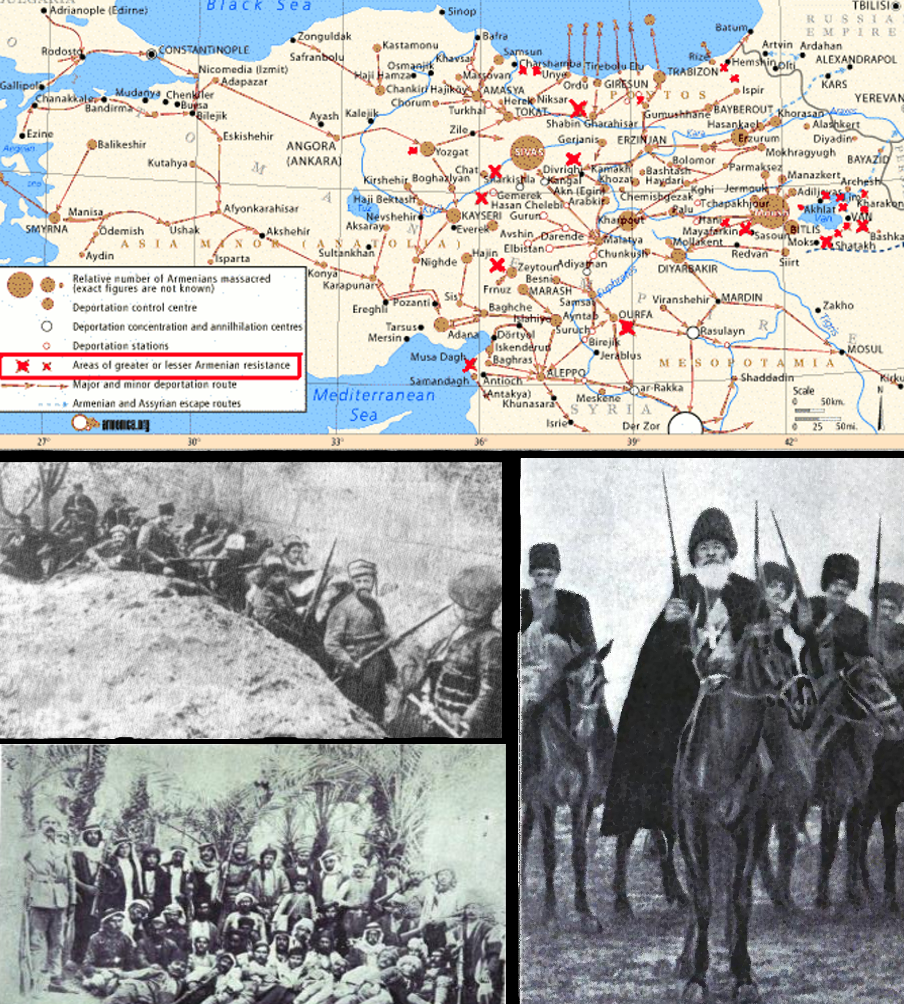
"Top:" The size of the stars show where the active conflicts occurred in 1915 "Left Upper:" Armenians defending the walls of Van in the spring of 1915 "Left Lower:" Armenian Resistance in Urfa "Right:" A seventy-year-old Armenian priest leading Armenians to battle field.

Between April 15–18 of 1915, the brigade of Armenian volunteers under the command of Andranik participated in the Battle of Dilman of the Persian Campaign.

Drastamat Kanayan led his battalion into eleven battles in the neighborhood of Alashkert, Toutakh, and Malashkert.

On Red Sunday the leaders of the Armenian community were arrested and moved to two holding centers near Ankara upon the order of the Minister of the Interior Mehmed Talaat Bey of April 24, 1915. Talaat Bey delivered the detention order on April 24, 1915, which commenced at 8 p.m. and carried out by Chief of Police of Constantinople Bedri Bey.

Hampartsoum Boyadjian, a Hunchak, was among the first to be arrested in April 1915 at Red Sunday. After a trial in July, he was hanged on 24 August 1915, with 12 comrades.

On May 6, 1915, Andranik was the commanding officer of the first Armenian volunteer detachment (about 1,200 soldiers), which helped lift the Siege of Van.

On June 15, 1915, The Twenty Martyrs were sentenced to death by hanging. All twenty men were Hunchak leaders, and after spending two years in Ottoman prisons, and undergoing lengthy show trials, were hanged in Bayazid Square.

==== 1916 ====
In 1915 the Administration for Western Armenia, popularly known as the Republic of Van, was established under Russian protection, with Aram Manukian as its head. The Republic of Van was a provisional government which lasted until 1918.

Andranik commanded a battalion which defeated Halil Pasha in the Battle of Bitlis in 1916.

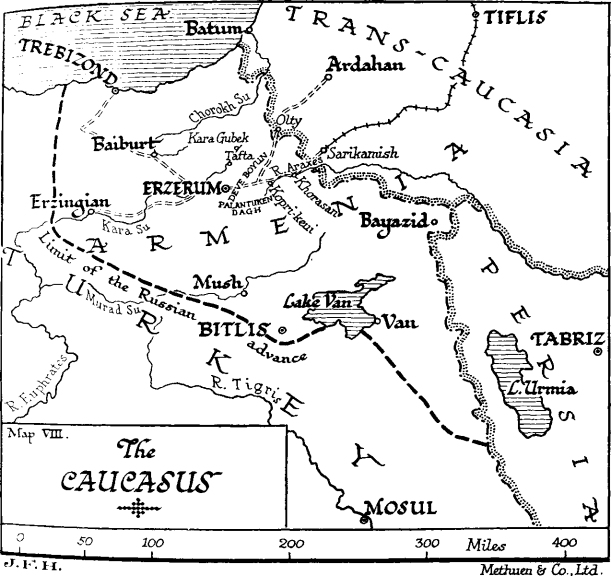
Administration for Western Armenia, (Republic of Van) in 1916

Negotiations with the French for returning Armenian refugees to their homes in Cilicia conducted under Boghos Nubar. Negotiations were conducted within the Quai d'Orsay. Foreign Minister Aristide Briand used this opportunity to provide troops for the French commitment made in the Sykes-Picot Agreement, which was still secret at the time. Armenian leadership also meet with Sir Mark Sykes and François Georges-Picot. The French Armenian Legion was officially established in Cairo, Egypt in November 1916, and put under the command of General Edmund Allenby. Beginning in 1917, this Armenian force fought to the frontlines in Palestine and Syria against the agreement.

==== 1917 ====
The February Revolution of 1917 caused chaos in Russian forces on the Caucasus Front, and by the end of that year most Russian soldiers left the front and returned to their homes. In July 1917, six Armenian regiments were created in the Caucasus Front with the support of Armenian organizations in Petrograd and Tiflis. As of October 1917 two Armenian divisions were already created, with Tovmas Nazarbekian at their head. As of early 1918 only a few thousand Armenian volunteers under the command of two hundred officers opposed the Ottoman army.

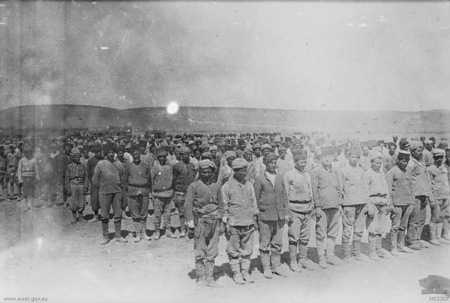
Armenian Battalion under British forces

In the spring of 1917, Karekin Pastermadjian and Dr. Hakob Zavriev was sent from the Caucasus to Petrograd to negotiate with the Russian provisional government concerning Caucasian affairs. Pastermadjian then left for America in June 1917 as the representative of the Armenian National Council of Tiflis and as the special envoy of the Catholicos of all the Armenians. He was assigned as the ambassador of the First Republic of Armenia to the United States in Washington, D.C.

On December 5, 1917, the armistice of Erzincan was signed between the Russians and Ottomans, ending hostilities between the two states. After the October Revolution, a multinational congress of Transcaucasian representatives met to create a provisional regional executive body known as Transcaucasian Seim.

==== 1918 ====
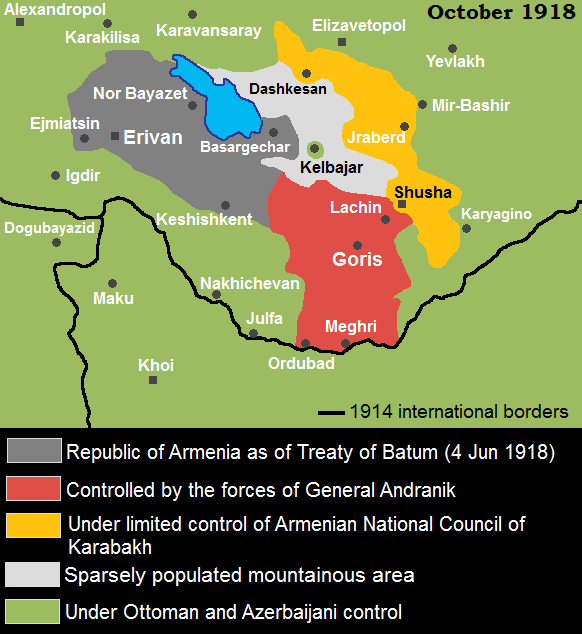
October 1918

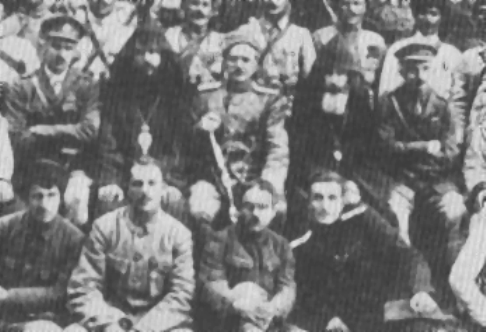
Andranik in 1918

In 1918, the Russian authorities made Andranik a Major General. He was then governor of the Administration for Western Armenia, from March and April 1918.

The roots of an Armenian republic was achieved by the Armenians under Russian control which devised a national congress in October 1917. The Armenian National Council of Tiflis was concluded in September 1917 with 203 delegates from Russian Armenia, of which 103 belonged to the ARF. On March 3, 1918, the Russians followed the armistice of Erzincan with the Treaty of Brest-Litovsk, and exited the war, with territorial losses. From March 14 to April 1918, a conference was held between the Ottoman Empire and a delegation of the Seim. When the first Republic of Armenia (First Republic of Armenia) was proclaimed in 1918, the ARF became the ruling party.

The original plan for the Armenian army was to consist of Tovmas Nazarbekian's 60,000 soldiers with Andranik Pasha's 30,000 fedayees. However, after the dissolution of the Transcaucasian Democratic Federative Republic, the Ottoman Empire had taken Alexandropol and were intent on taking Yerevan. After the formation of the First Republic of Armenia in May 1918 Andranik fought alongside volunteer units to stop the Ottoman army. The Armenians were able to stop the Turkish army in the battles of Sardarapat and Abaran. The First Republic of Armenia had to sign the Treaty of Batum on June 4, 1918. After the Ottoman Empire took vast swathes of territory and imposed harsh conditions, the new republic was left with 10,000 square kilometers. Andranik's military leadership was instrumental in allowing the Armenian population of Van to escape the Ottoman Army and flee to Eastern Armenia.

On July 26, 1918, the Centrocaspian Dictatorship was a short-lived anti-Soviet client state proclaimed in Baku, forged by the Mensheviks and the ARF, and the unrecognized state replaced the Bolshevik Baku Commune in a bloodless coup d'état. The Baku forces mainly were commanded by Colonel Avetisov. Under his command were about 6,000 Centrocaspian Dictatorship troops of the Baku Army. The vast majority of the troops in this force were Armenians, though there were some Russians among them. Their artillery comprised some 40 field guns. Most of the Baku Soviet troops and practically all their officers were Armenians of ARF affiliation. Centrocaspian Dictatorship fell on September 15, 1918, when the Ottoman-Azerbaijani forces took Baku after the Battle of Baku.

By July a sectarian conflict had started in Zangezur. Armenian couriers dispatched to Yerevan pleaded for officers and materiel. The Republic could not support irregular forces fighting in the south. At the critical moment General Andranik arrived in Zangezur with an irregular division estimated with about 3 to 5 thousand men and 40,000 refugees and the occupied provinces of Russian Armenia. As the commander of Armenian forces in Nakhichivan Autonomous Republic, Andranik declared that his army was determined to continue the war against the Ottoman Empire. His activities were concentrated at the link between the Ottoman Empire and the Azerbaijan Democratic Republic at Karabakh, Nakhchivan, and Zangezur.

Andranik and his troops were 40 km (25 mi) from Shusha, the most important city of Karabakh at the time, in early December 1918. Just before the Armistice of Mudros was signed, Andranik was on the way from Zangezur to Shusha, to control the main city of Karabakh. In January 1919 Armenian troops advanced, and the British general William M. Thomson gave Andranik assurances that a favorable treaty would be reached at the Paris Peace Conference of 1919.

=== Path to Unified Armenia ===
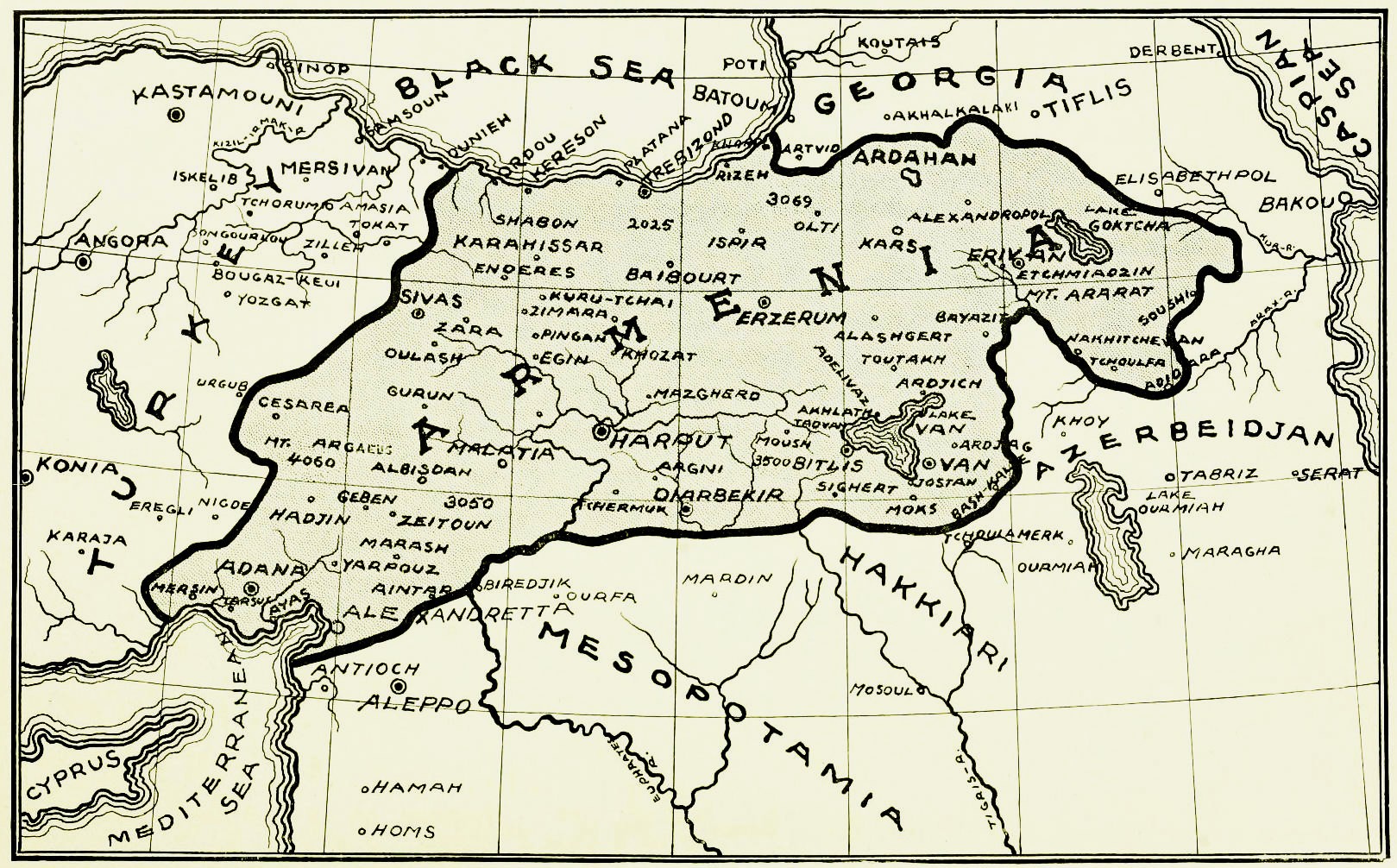
Officially presented by the Armenian National Delegation to the Paris Peace Conference, 1919

On October 30, the Armistice of Moudros ended the hostilities in the Middle Eastern theatre between the Ottoman Empire and the Allies of World War I. It also concluded the Caucasus Campaign for the Ottoman Empire. By the end of the war, the Ottoman Empire, although it lost the Persian Campaign, the Sinai and Palestine Campaign, and the Mesopotamian Campaign, it had re-captured all the territory which was lost to the Russians. The Ottomans signed several treaties establishing its supremacy in the caucasus: on December 5, 1917, the armistice of Erzincan, on March 3, 1918 Treaty of Brest-Litovsk, on March 14 Trabzon peace conference and on June 4, 1918, Treaty of Batum.

In 1919, Avetis Aharonyan was the head of the Armenian delegation at the Paris Peace Conference with Boghos Nubar. In late 1919 Andranik led a delegation to the United States to lobby its support for a mandate for Armenia. He was accompanied by General Jaques Bagratuni, Captain Haig Bonapartian, and Lieutenant Ter-Pogossian. In Fresno he directed a campaign in which he raised $500,000 for the relief of Armenian war refugees.

Aharonyan signed the Treaty of Sèvres formulating the "Wilsonian Armenia" in direct collaboration with the Armenian Diaspora. The treaty was signed between the Allied Powers and the Ottoman Empire at Sèvres, France on August 10, 1920. It made all parties signing the treaty recognize Armenia as a free and independent state. The drawing of definite borders was, however, left to President Woodrow Wilson and the United States Department of State, and was only presented to Armenia on November 22. Wilsonian Armenia refers to the boundary configuration of the Armenian state in the Treaty of Sèvres, drawn by Woodrow Wilson.

== Activities during Interwar period ==
=== Territorial disputes of Armenia ===
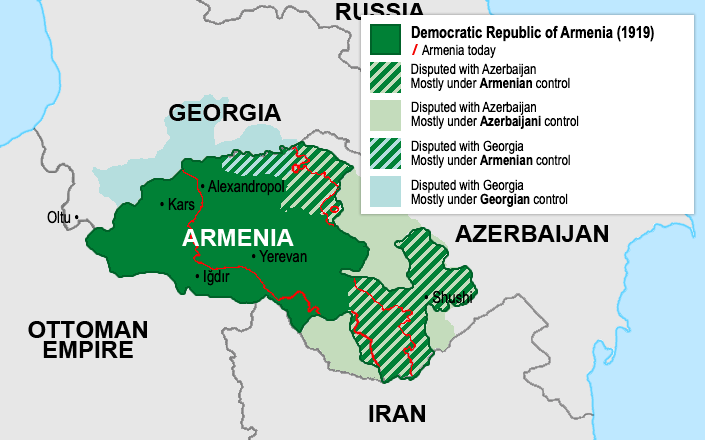
First Internationally recognized Armenian state.

On September 24 and the Turkish–Armenian War began, which resulted in a Turkish victory. Negotiations were then carried out between Kâzım Karabekir and a peace delegation led by Alexander Khatisian in Alexandropol. Although Karabekir's terms were harsh the Armenian delegation had little recourse but to agree to them. The Treaty of Alexandropol was thus signed on December 3, 1920, after the Armenian government had fallen to a concurrent Soviet invasion on December 2.

Azerbaijan claimed most of the territory Armenia was sitting on, demanding all or most parts of the former Russian provinces of Elizavetpol, Tiflis, Yerevan, Kars and Batum. Territorial clashes between Armenia and Azerbaijan took place throughout 1919 and 1920, most notably in the regions of Nakhichevan, Karabakh and Syunik (Zangezur).

In May 1919, Dro led an expeditionary unit that was successful in establishing Armenian administrative control in Nakhichevan.

=== Sovietization and exile of Armenian leaders ===
However, despite ARF's tight grip on power, the ARF was unable to stop the impending Red Army invasion of Armenia from the north, which culminated with a Soviet takeover in 1920. There was also a large movement of Armenian communists who aided the Soviet control. The 11th Red Army began its virtually unopposed advance into Armenia on November 29, 1920.

The actual transfer of power took place on December 2 in Yerevan. The Armenian leadership approved an ultimatum, presented to it by the Soviet plenipotentiary Boris Legran. The ARF was banned its leaders exiled and many of its members dispersed to other parts of the world.

Daniel Bek-Pirumyan was arrested and executed by the Bolsheviks in Karakilisa in 1921. In 1937 during Joseph Stalin's Great Purge against the military and other suspected enemies, his secret police arrested Movses Silikyan, Christophor Araratov, Dmitry Mirimanov, Aghasi Varosyan, Stepan Ohanesyan, Hakob Mkrtchyan, and Harutyun Hakobyan imprisoned and finally executed in Nork gorge. Aghbalyan moved to Lebanon, and established the Nshan Palanjian seminarium in Beirut.

The Treaty of Kars was signed on October 13, 1921, and ratified in Yerevan on September 11, 1922. The treaty established the current borders between Turkey and the South Caucasus states. Armenian Minister of Foreign Affairs Askanaz Mravian and Minister of Interior Poghos Makintsian signed the Treaty of Kars, which helped to conclude the territorial disputes after the Caucasus Campaign.

=== Cilicia and French Armenian Legion ===
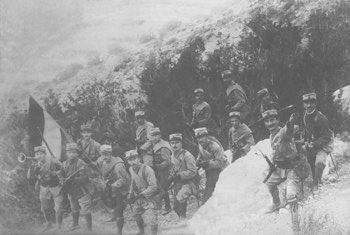
French Armenian Legion and Franco-Turkish War

In January 1920, Turkish National Movement sent forces to Marash, where the Battle of Marash ensued against the French Armenian Legion. The battle resulted in the massacres of 5,000 – 12,000 Armenians, spelling the end of the remaining Armenian population in the region.

France disbanded the French Armenian Legion shortly after the war started. One of the Armenian Legion members, Sarkis Torossian, wrote in his diary that he suspected the French forces gave weapons and ammunition to the Kemalists to allow the French army safe passage out of Cilicia.

The Cilicia Peace Treaty between France and the Ankara Government was signed on 9 March 1921. It was intended to end the Franco-Turkish war, but failed to do so and was replaced in October 1921 with the Treaty of Ankara.

=== Republic of Mountainous Armenia, 1922 ===
On 18 February 1921, the ARF led an anti-Soviet rebellion in Yerevan and seized power. The ARF controlled Yerevan and the surrounding regions for almost 42 days before being defeated by the numerically superior Red Army troops later in April 1921. The leaders of the rebellion then retreated into the Syunik region. On 26 April 1921, the 2nd Pan-Zangezurian congress, held in Tatev, announced the independence of the self-governing regions of Daralakyaz (Vayots Dzor), Zangezur, and Mountainous Artsakh, under the name of the Republic of Mountainous Armenia and later on 1 June 1921, it was renamed the Republic of Armenia.

After months of fierce battles with the Red Army, the Republic of Mountainous Armenia capitulated in July 1921, following Soviet Russia's promises to keep the mountainous region as a part of Soviet Armenia. After losing the battle, Garegin Nzhdeh, his soldiers, and many prominent Armenian intellectuals, including leaders of the first Independent Republic of Armenia, crossed the border into the neighbouring Persian city of Tabriz.

=== Operation Nemesis ===
Operation Nemesis was the ARF's code-name for a covert operation in the early 1920s to assassinate the Turkish planners of the Armenian genocide. Those involved with the planning and execution of the operation (including Shahan Natalie and Soghomon Tehlirian) were survivors of genocide. The Operation, between 1920 and 1922, assassinated many significant political and military figures of the Ottoman Empire, the Internal Affairs Minister of Azerbaijan and some Armenians who were working against the Armenian cause.

== Achievements of the movement ==
=== Establishment of an Armenian State ===
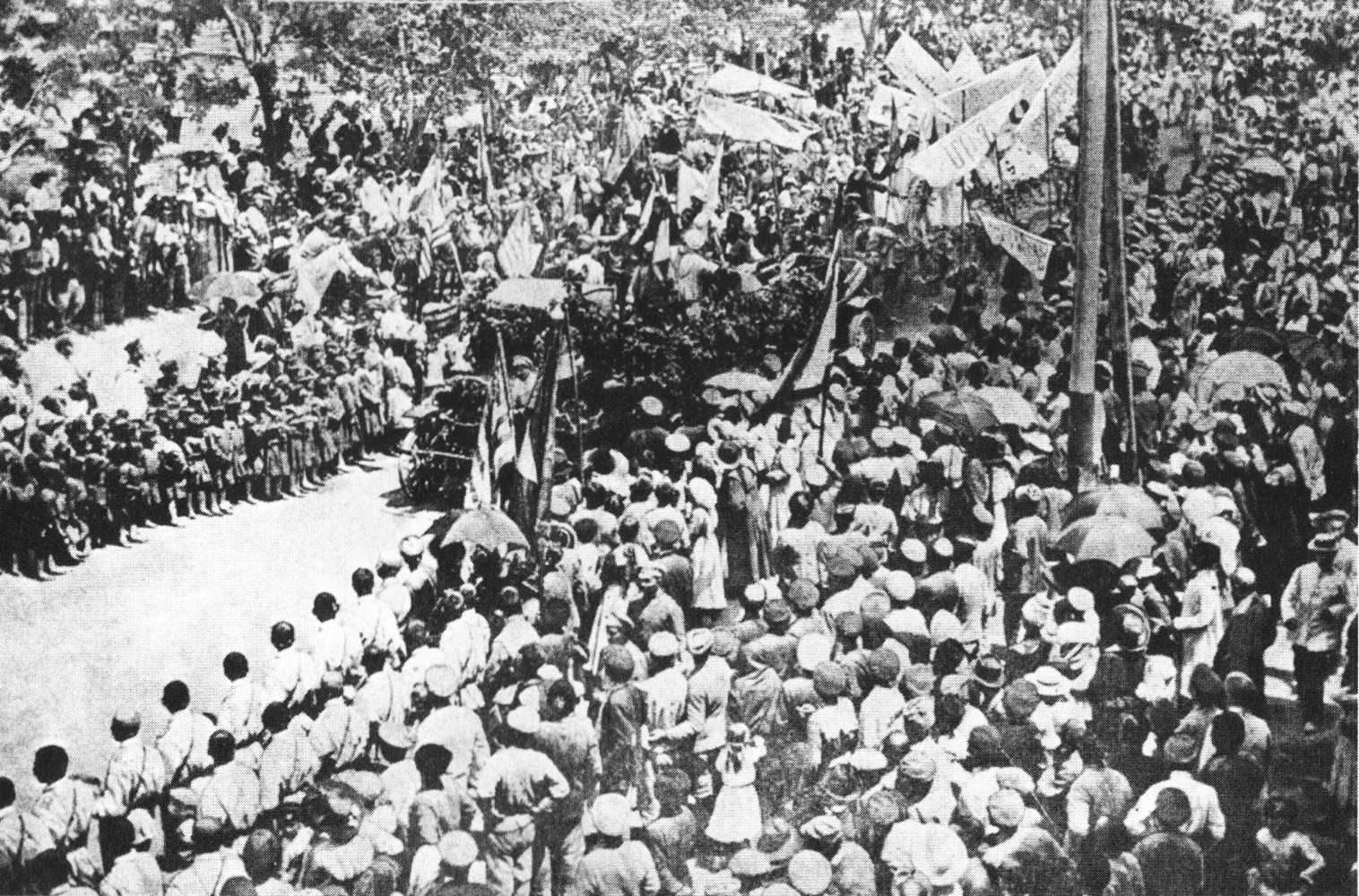
Armenians celebrating the first year of their state.

The First Republic of Armenia was the first modern establishment of an Armenian state. The leaders of the government came from mainly the Armenian Revolutionary Federation and also other Armenian political parties who helped create the new republic. When it was declared, out of 2,000,000 Russian Armenians in the Caucasus, 1,300,000 Russian Armenians were to be found within the boundaries of the new Republic of Armenia, which also had 300,000 to 350,000 refugees that escaped from the Ottoman Empire. Added to this Armenian population were 350,000 to 400,000 people of other nationalities. There were 1,650,000 Armenians (both Russian, and Ottoman origin) of the 2,000,000 people within the borders of the new Republic.

Richard G. Hovannisian explains the conditions of the resistance:

"In the summer of 1918, the Armenian national councils reluctantly transferred from Tiflis to Yerevan to take over the leadership of the republic from the popular dictator Aram Manukian and the renowned military commander Drastamat Kanayan. It then began the daunting process of establishing a national administrative machinery in an isolated and landlocked misery. This was not the autonomy or independence which Armenian intellectuals had dreamed of and for which a generation of youth had been sacrificed. Yet, as it happened, it was here that the Armenian people were destined to continue [their] national existence."

— R.G. Hovannisian

== Timeline of the movement ==
The timeline covers the activities of Armenian citizens of the Ottoman Empire, Russian Empire and the Armenian diaspora in Europe as early as the 1890s. The timeline has events formulated by the Social Democrat Hunchakian Party, Armenakan Party, Armenian Revolutionary Federation, and Armenian Patriotic Society of Europe. The events under the Armenian Soviet Socialist Republic are not covered.

== Legacy ==
There is a Fedayees museum in Yerevan named after General Andranik Ozanian. Armenian resistance has left a symbolic dish. The "Harissa (dish)" (Armenian: Հարիսա): is generally served to commemorate the Musa Dagh resistance.

== See also ==
- Military history of Armenia
- Armenian delegation at the Berlin Congress

== Citations ==
- Nalbandian, Louise (1963). The Armenian revolutionary movement: the development of Armenian political parties through the nineteenth century (3. ed.). Berkeley: University of California Press. ISBN 978-0-520-00914-1. OCLC 500605937.
- Missen, Leslie (1984). Young, Peter (ed.). The Marshall Cavendish illustrated encyclopedia of World War I. Vol. 9. New York: Marshall Cavendish. pp. 2766–2772. ISBN 978-0-86307-181-2.
- Pasdermadjian, Garegin (1918). Why Armenia Should be Free: Armenia's Role in the Present War. Hairenik Association. p. 45. OCLC 459140052.
- Erickson, Edward J. (2001). Ordered to die: a history of the Ottoman army in the First World War. Contributions in military studies. Westport, Conn.: Greenwood Press. ISBN 978-0-313-31516-9.
- Nogales Méndez, Rafael de; Lee, Muna (1926). Four years beneath the crescent. London: Sterndale classics. ISBN 978-1-903656-19-8. OCLC 1080667306.
- Akçam, Taner (2006). A shameful act: the Armenian genocide and the question of Turkish responsibility (1st U.S. ed.). New York: Metropolitan Books. ISBN 978-0-8050-7932-6. OCLC 64844685.
- Hovannisian, Richard G. (1967). Armenia on the road to independence, 1918. Berkeley [Calif.] London: University of California Press. ISBN 978-0-520-00574-7.
- Peimani, Hooman (2009). Conflict and security in Central Asia and the Caucasus. Santa Barbara, Calif: ABC-Clio. ISBN 978-1-59884-054-4. OCLC 607485251.
- McDowall, David (2004). A Modern History of the Kurds (3rd ed.). I.B. Tauris. ISBN 978-1-44-164129-8. OCLC 607555079.
