= Nerses II =

Nerses II may refer to:

- Nerses II, Catholicos of Armenia in 548–557
- Nerses II, Armenian Patriarch of Constantinople in 1874–1884
