= Panos Terlemezian =

Armenian landscape and portrait painter

- Փանոս Թերլեմեզյան
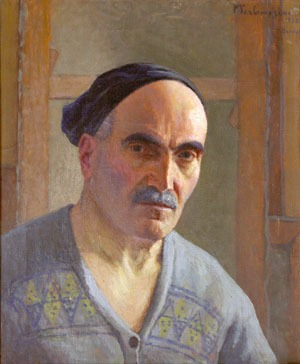
- Self-portrait (date unknown)
- Born: 11 March 1865; Aygestan, Van vilayet, Ottoman Empire
- Died: 30 April 1941 (aged 76); Yerevan, Armenian SSR, USSR
- Awards: Order of the Red Banner of Labour (1939)

Panos Terlemezian (Armenian: Փանոս Թերլեմեզյան; 11 March 1865, Aygestan near Van – 30 April 1941, Yerevan) was an Armenian landscape and portrait painter; known for his support of Armenian nationalist causes.

== Biography ==
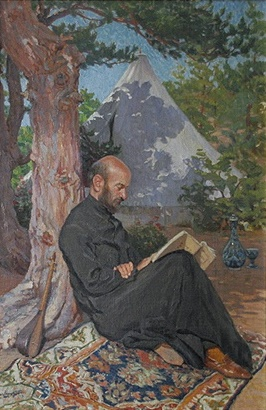
Portrait of the composer, Komitas

His love for painting expressed itself while he was still in elementary school. From 1881 to 1885, he studied at the private college operated by Mekertich Portukalian, who inspired him to become one of the first members of his Armenakan Party. Then, for four years, he taught drawing and several other subjects in Van. In 1890, he was arrested and accused of belonging to a group that opposed the Ottoman government, but was released after six months for lack of evidence.

After that, his involvement in Armenian nationalism increased and, in 1893, he was forced to flee to Iran. From there, he made his way to Tbilisi, where he lived until 1895, working first for a printing office, then for the Armenian language newspaper, Mshak. After that, he went to Saint Petersburg, where he worked in the studios of Lev Dimitriev-Kavkazsky and took art lessons, with financial support from Mkrtich Khrimian.

In 1897, he went to Estonia to work with some friends. There, at the request of the Ottoman government, he was arrested and detained. Eventually, he was extradited and imprisoned in Yerevan. The following year, he was secretly exiled to Iran. Shortly after, he managed to elude his guardians and made his way to Paris; continuing his studies at the Académie Julian with Jean-Paul Laurens and Jean-Joseph Benjamin-Constant. He graduated in 1904 and returned to his home region, once again settling in Tbilisi, where he taught at the Nersisian School.

He made an extensive tour of North Africa in 1908, and returned to Paris, where he stayed until 1910. That year, he went to Istanbul, where he became acquainted with Komitas, Daniel Varoujan, Siamanto, Yervant Odian and many other Armenian cultural figures. Together with Leon Kyurkchyan, he opened a painting school. He held his first solo exhibition in 1913.

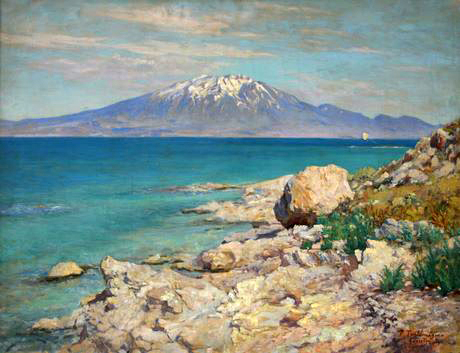
The canvas «Lake Van and Mount Sipan viewed from Ktouts Island», 1915

In 1915, he was one of the organizers of the Defense of Van, a city where thousands of villagers had sought refuge from the Armenian genocide. When their defense failed, he accompanied the refugees who had managed to escape and, once again, found himself living in Tbilisi. The following year, he was one of the founding members of the Union of Armenian Artists and established its branch in Rostov-on-Don. From 1920 to 1923, he spent much of his time in France and Italy. He then went to the United States; painting portraits in New York, Los Angeles, San Francisco and, especially, Fresno, a city with a large number of Armenian emigrants, where he held major solo exhibitions in 1925 and 1926.

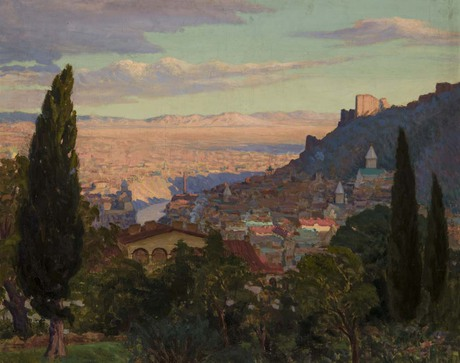
The Old City, Tbilisi

At the invitation of the Transcaucasian SFSR, he returned home in 1928 and settled in Yerevan; presenting a solo exhibition at the National Gallery of Armenia in 1929.The following year, he was awarded the Order of the Red Banner of Labor. He became a member of the Artists' Union of the USSR upon its founding, in 1932.

After his death, the government of the Armenian SSR renamed the Yerevan College of Fine Arts in his honor. In 2015, the National Gallery held a major retrospective of his works to celebrate the 150th anniversary of his birth.

== Sources ==
- "Panos Terlemezyan - jubilee exhibition" @ the National Academy of Sciences
- "Terlemezyan History" @ the Terlemezyan State College of Fine Arts
- Brief biography @ Maslovka
- "This Week in Armenian History: Death of Panos Terlemezian" @ Milwaukee Armenians
