= Armenakan Party =

Armenian political party in the Ottoman Empire

Armenakan Party Արմենական Կուսակցութիւն (Armenian)
- Historical leader: Mekertich Portukalian
- Founded: 1885
- Dissolved: 1921
- Merged into: Armenian Democratic Liberal Party
- Headquarters: Van, Ottoman Empire
- Ideology: Liberalism (Armenian); Armenian nationalism
- Political position: Centre-right

The Armenakan Party (Armenian: Արմենական Կուսակցութիւն, romanized: Armenakan Kusaktsutyun) was an Armenian political party established in Van, Ottoman Empire in 1885 by Mekertich Portukalian as an underground organization against the ruling system. It is considered the first Armenian political party.

The party was founded in autumn 1885 by journalist and teacher Mekertich Portukalian and nine of his disciples: Meguerditch Avetisian, M. Baroudjian, Panos Terlemezian, Grigor Adjemian, Grigor Adian, Grigor Beozikian, Rouben Chatavarian, Kevork Handjian and Garegin Manoukian.

Portukalian, who was based in Marseille, kept in touch with the leaders and published a journal of political and social enlightenment, Armenia (1885-1923). Portukalian is also cited as the father of the Armenian Patriotic Society of Europe.

After Mekertich Portukalian, the Armenians of Van continued developing the political principles of Armenian nationalism in secret. The party's aim soon became winning the right of Armenians to rule over themselves through revolutionary armed struggle and thus liberate Armenia from the Ottoman Empire. Its concept of revolution was distinctly limited in comparison with that of succeeding organisations; it viewed terrorism, agitation and militant demonstrations with disfavor, preferring instead to deploy Armenians trained in the use of arms as guerrillas against the Ottoman Empire.

The party's main misconception was that enemies of the Ottoman Empire would intervene and rescue the Armenian people throughout the period 1885–1918.

With the turn of the century, Armenakans established cells outside Van, in other towns in the province, as well as in Trabzon and Istanbul. The military structure was developed in Russian Transcaucasia, in Persia and in the United States.

Activities in the Ottoman Empire:

- Bashkaleh Resistance: (May, 1889)
- Van Rebellion : (June, 1896)
- Siege of Van: (April 19, 1915 - May 6, 1915)

== Merger into the Armenian Democratic Liberal Party ==
After the Armenian genocide, the remnants of the Armenakans joined forces with the splinter faction of the Social Democrat Hunchakian Party known as Reorganized Hunchakian Party, the Armenian Constitutional Democratic Party, and the Popular Party, and founded the Armenian Democratic Liberal Party (Ռամկավար Ազատական Կուսակցութիւն (ՌԱԿ)) or Ramgavar Party) in Constantinople on October 1, 1921. The membership of the Armenakan Party was absorbed into the new party. The party went on to become one of the three traditional Armenian diaspora political groupings alongside the Armenian Revolutionary Federation and the Social Democrat Hunchakian Party.

== See also ==
- Armenian Democratic Liberal Party
