= Kukunian Expedition =

Kukunyan Expedition
Date	1890
Location	Ottoman Empire and Russian Empire
Result	Defeat of Kukunyan: The defeat of Kukunyan against the Ottoman forces; Kukunyan and his army were captured and arrested by the Russian Empire and exiled to Siberia.

Belligerents
Armenian Revolutionary Federation	Ottoman Empire	Russian Empire

Commanders and leaders
Sarkis Kukunyan	Unknown	Unknown

The Kukunyan Expedition (Armenian: Կուկունեանի արշաւանքը) was an attempt by a small group of Armenian nationalists from the Russian Empire to launch an armed expedition across the border into the Ottoman Empire in 1890 in support of local Armenians.

== Background ==
The Armenian Revolutionary Federation was the Armenian organization of Armenian national movement active in the region. The leader of the expedition was a former student, Sarkis Kukunian (1866–1913). Like many other Russian Armenians, he was concerned with the fate of Ottoman Armenians living under the rule of the Sultan Abdul Hamid II. Initially, Kukunyan had the backing of the leading Armenian nationalist party in Russia, the Dashnaks, but they soon tried to dissuade him from embarking on such an unrealistic scheme.

With financial support from wealthy Armenians living in Tbilisi and Baku, Kukunian was able to buy weapons and raise a volunteer force of 125 men.

== Conflict ==
Kukunyan went ahead with his expedition and his volunteer force set off on 27 September 1890. They crossed the border but ran low on food supplies and after a clash with Turkish and Kurdish troops, they retreated to Russia. Here they were intercepted by Cossacks who arrested 43 members of the expedition. The Russian authorities treated any Armenian nationalist activity within their empire with deep suspicion and the arrested members were put on trial. They had fought under a banner with the initials "M.H.", which could stand for either "Mother Armenia" or "Union of Patriots" in Armenian. The prosecutor at the trial, which took place in Kars in 1892, alleged that the letters meant "United Armenia", another possible – and more subversive – interpretation. 27 of the accused were convicted and exiled to Siberia.

== Aftermath ==
Although the expedition was a failure, its members became heroes of the Armenian nationalist cause and the subject of patriotic songs.

== Sources ==
- Suny, Ronald Grigor (1993). Looking Toward Ararat: Armenia in Modern History. Indiana University Press. pp. 304 pages. ISBN 0-253-20773-8.
- Ternon, Yves (1996). Les Arméniens. Seuil. pp. 436 pages. ISBN 2-02-025685-1.
