= 1889 Bashkale clash =

Bashkale Resistance
Date	May 1889
Location	Başkale, Van Vilayet, Ottoman Empire

Belligerents
Ottoman Empire	Armenakan Party

Strength
4 zaptiyes	3 revolutionaries

Casualties and losses
None	2 killed

The Bashkale Resistance (Armenian: 1889 թվականի Բաշկալեի բախում) was the bloody encounter between three revolutionaries of Armenakan and some Ottoman officials in May 1889. It is named after the town of Başkale in the Van Vilayet of the Ottoman Empire, today in Van Province of Turkey. The event was important as it was reflected on main Armenian newspapers as the recovered documents on the Armenakans showed an extensive plot for an uprising.

== The event ==
The comrades Karapet Koulaksizian, Hovhannes Agripasian, and Vardan Goloshian, left the village of Haftvan (Salmast district of Persia), for Van on 16 May 1889. They were stopped near Van by Ottoman police. The police demanded that they disarm to protect the accompanying caravan. In the conflict Goloshian and Agripasian died and Koulaksizian escaped. The police recovered two letters (accompanying documents) addressed to Koulaksizian, one from Avetis Patiguian of London and the other from Mekertitch Portugalian in Marseille.

== Reflections ==
Ottoman Empire believed that the men were members of a large revolutionary apparatus and the discussion was reflected on newspapers, (Eastern Express, Oriental Advertiser, Saadet, and Tarik) and the responses were on the Armenian papers. In some Armenian circles, this event was considered as a martyrdom and brought other armed conflicts.
