= Nerses II Varzhabedian =

Catholicos Nerses II Varzhabedian
- Catholicos of All Armenians
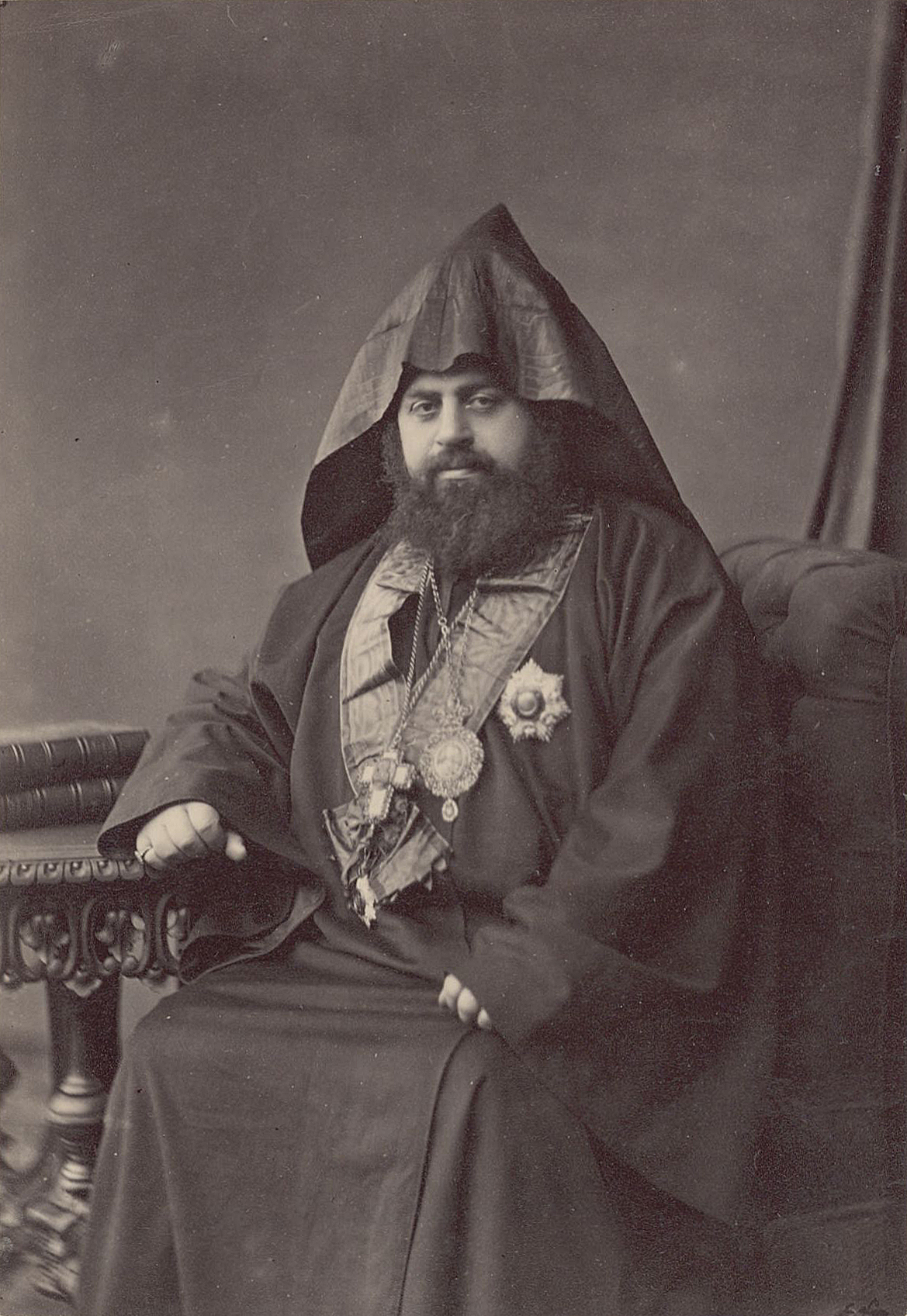
- Church: Armenian Apostolic Church
- See: Armenian Patriarch of Constantinople
- Installed: 1874
- Term ended: 1884
- Predecessor: Mkrtich Khrimian
- Successor: Harutiun I

Personal details
- Born: Nerses Varzhabedian; 1837 Istanbul, Ottoman Empire
- Died: 1884 (aged 46–47)
- Occupation: Priest

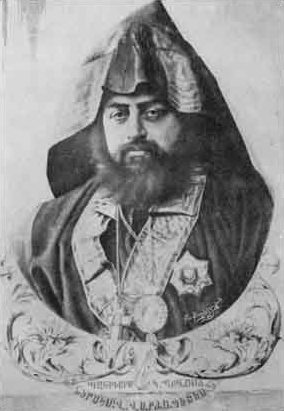
Nerses Varjabedyan (1837-1884) in 1878

Nerses Varzhabedian (Armenian: Ներսէս Բ Վարժապետեան Կոստանդնուպոլսեցի) served as the Armenian Patriarch of Constantinople between 1874 and 1884. He oversaw the church during the Russo-Turkish War. In the aftermath of the war, he strove to convince the Sultanate that the Ottoman Armenians were still loyal to the state and that they were not trying to achieve national independence. This was just a few years before the Hamidian Massacres against the Armenian civilians.

== Controversy ==
A major controversy arose over the figures submitted to the Berlin Congress. In his memorandum addressed to the Congress (subsequently used extensively by various writers) Patriarch Nerses placed the number of Armenians in Erzurum, Van (Moush and Siirt included), Sivas, Kharpert, Diyarbekir, and Halep at 780,000 and the number of Syrians (i.e., Assyrians, or Syriacs) and Greeks at 251,000 and 25,000, respectively, for a total of 1,056,800 Christians. The total number of Muslims in these areas, according to the patriarch, amounted to a mere 770,000, of whom only 320,000 were Turks, the rest being Kurds, Qizilbash, and Turcoman; of course, the last two groups were also ethnically Turkic. Moreover, the patriarch gave the population of Adana as consisting of only 86,000 Muslims, as against 134,000 Christians; on the other hand, Captain Casper, the former British vice-counsul in Adana, numbered the Muslims at 327,980 and the Christians at 33,780.

== See also ==
- List of Armenian Patriarchs of Constantinople
- Armenians in the Ottoman Empire
- Armenian Apostolic Church
