= Armenian Patriotic Society of Europe =

The Armenian Patriotic Society of Europe (Armenian: Եվրոպայի հայ հայրենասիրական ընկերություն) was founded in December 1885 by Garabed Hagopian and Mekertich Portukalian. Its goal was to facilitate the Armenian diaspora in providing aid to their native land, both financially and politically due to Armenia's oppressed condition at the time. The headquarters of the Society were located in Chesilton Road, Fulham, England. The organization also sought to spread awareness of Armenian related issues throughout Britain.

== See also ==
- Armenia-European Union relations
- Armenia–United Kingdom relations
- Foreign relations of Armenia
