= Mekertich Portukalian =

Armenian politician (1848–1921)

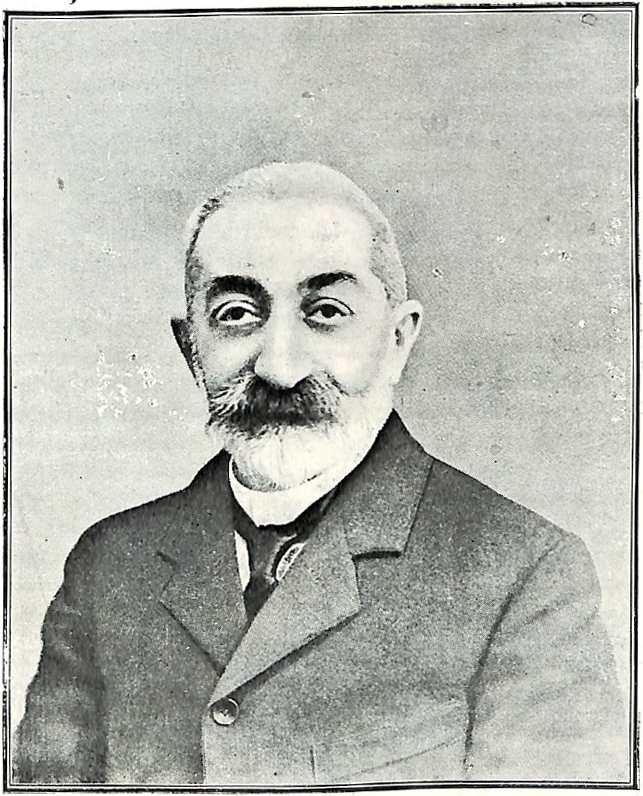
Mekertich Portukalian

Mekertich Portukalian (Armenian: Մկրտիչ Փորթուգալեան; October 21, 1848 – October 1921) was an Armenian teacher and journalist who founded the first Armenian political party, the Armenakan Party, in Van in 1885.

The son of a banker in Constantinople, Portukalian became a teacher and initially taught at Tokat. in 1873 Portukalian was arrested by the Ottoman authorities and the school he directed in Tokat was closed. He was released the same year and became the editor of the journal Asia in Constantinople. After a trip to Western Anatolia and the Balkans, he opened a school in Van in 1878. The school soon fell apart due to conflict among its members, and closed before the end of the year. During and immediately after the Russo-Turkish War of 1877–1878, he traveled to various cities in Russian and Ottoman Armenia, calling on Armenians to take up armed struggle. After the war, he participated in the creation of the Black Cross revolutionary society in Van.

Portukalian opened another school in Van in 1881. In 1885, he and his disciples founded the Armenakan Party, the first modern Armenian political party, which declared its goal to be the establishment of an independent Armenia by means of armed rebellion. In 1885, Portukalian's school in Van was closed by the Ottoman authorities, after which he was exiled and settled in Marseille. In Marseille, Portukalian maintained his ties with the leaders of the party and began the publication of the first pro-revolutionary Armenian newspaper, Armenia.

Portukalian died in Marseille in 1921.

== See also ==
- Armenian Patriotic Society of Europe
