= Military history of Armenia =

The early military history of Armenia is defined by the situation of the Armenian Highland between the Hellenistic states, and later the Byzantine Empire, in the west and the Persian Empire to the east. The Kingdom of Armenia had a series of repeated struggles against Persia or Rome, followed by renewed conquests into either of the neighboring empires. The period after the Muslim conquests in the 7th century, up to the late 15th century, was mostly marked by invasions by other empires, such as by the successive Arab Caliphates, the Seljuk Empire, the Ilkhanate, the Timurid Empire and the Ak Koyunlu and Kara Koyunlu, amongst others. Some periods of greater military independence were, intermittently, achieved under the Bagratids and, albeit located outside the Armenian Highlands, the Armenian Kingdom of Cilicia.

From the early 16th century, Eastern Armenia came under the rule of the successive dynasties of Iran, namely the Safavids, followed by the Afsharids and Qajars. In the course of the 16th century, and decisively with the Treaty of Zuhab (1639) Western Armenia came under Ottoman rule. Between the 16th century and mid 17th century, nevertheless, many of the frequent Ottoman-Persian Wars razed over both parts of Armenia as both rivals tried to expand their territories. Many Armenians fought in the Ottoman-Iranian armies for centuries.

After losing the war in 1828 Qajar Iran ceded Eastern Armenia to the Russian Empire. Thus, from 1828 and on, historical Armenia was again situated between two empires, this time the Ottoman Empire vs. the Russian Empire. During the events of the Armenian genocide, many Armenians resisted the actions of the Turkish government and took up arms.

In 1991, when, following the dissolution of the USSR the Armenian Republic was founded, hostile relations with the neighboring Azerbaijan Republic and the Nagorno-Karabakh conflict have been marked as being the most important military matters in Armenia.

== Early history ==
=== Armani ===
The Armani are mentioned to have fought the Akkadian Empire and to have a city sacked but not much more is known about the campaigns and wars between the nations nor the Armani nation itself.

=== Mitanni ===
After a few successful clashes with the Egyptians over the control of Syria, Mitanni sought peace with them, and an alliance was formed. During the reign of Shuttarna II, in the early 14th century BC, the relationship was very amicable, and he sent his daughter Gilu-Hepa to Egypt for a marriage with Pharaoh Amenhotep III. Mitanni was now at its peak of power.

However, by the reign of Eriba-Adad I (1390–1366 BC) Mitanni influence over Assyria was on the wane. Eriba-Adad I became involved in a dynastic battle between Tushratta and his brother Artatama II and after this his son Shuttarna II, who called himself king of the Hurri while seeking support from the Assyrians. A pro-Hurri/Assyria faction appeared at the royal Mitanni court. Eriba-Adad I had thus loosened Mitanni influence over Assyria, and in turn had now made Assyria an influence over Mitanni affairs. King Ashur-Uballit I (1365–1330 BC) of Assyria attacked Shuttarna and annexed Mitanni territory in the middle of the 14th century BC, making Assyria once more a great power.

At the death of Shuttarna, Mitanni was ravaged by a war of succession. Eventually Tushratta, a son of Shuttarna, ascended the throne, but the kingdom had been weakened considerably and both the Hittite and Assyrian threats increased. At the same time, the diplomatic relationship with Egypt went cold, the Egyptians fearing the growing power of the Hittites and Assyrians. The Hittite king Suppiluliuma I invaded the Mitanni vassal states in northern Syria and replaced them with loyal subjects.

In the capital Washukanni, a new power struggle broke out. The Hittites and the Assyrians supported different pretenders to the throne. Finally a Hittite army conquered the capital Washukanni and installed Shattiwaza, the son of Tushratta, as their vassal king of Mitanni in the late 14th century BC. The kingdom had by now been reduced to the Khabur Valley. The Assyrians had not given up their claim on Mitanni, and in the 13th century BC, Shalmaneser I annexed the kingdom.

=== Nairi, Shupria and Hayassa ===
The Nairi, Shupria and Hayassa tribes are a successive continuation of Armenian confederations that fought the Assyrians and Hittites for almost 500 years going from periods of vassalisation and infighting to periods of fierce campaigns against the Hittites causing a lot of trouble. There are mentions of 40 kings confirming the fact that this was a confederation of kingdoms who had to pay tribute to the Assyrians

=== Urartu ===
Urartu (Biainili in Urartian) was an ancient kingdom in the mountainous plateau between Asia Minor, Mesopotamia, and Caucasus mountains, later known as the Armenian Highland, and it centered around Lake Van (present-day eastern Turkey). The kingdom existed from about 1000 BC, or earlier, until 585 BC. The name corresponds to the Biblical Ararat.

Urartu was often called the "Kingdom of Ararat" in many ancient manuscripts and holy writings of different nations. The reason for uncertainty in the names (i.e. Urartu and Ararat) is due to variations in sources. In fact, the written languages at that time employed only consonants and not vowels. So the word itself in various ancient sources is written as "RRT", which could be either Ararat, or Urartu, or Uruarti and so on (for more on the name's etymology, see the section Name below).

Ancient sources have sometimes used "Armenia" and "Urartu" interchangeably to refer to the same country. For example, in the trilingual Behistun inscription, carved in 520 BC by the order of Darius the Great of Persia the country is referred to as Arminia in Old Persian, translated as Harminuia in Elamite and Urartu in Babylonian.

Furthermore, the kingdom was known as Armenia to the Greeks (and, subsequently, to the Roman Empire) living in western Anatolia, possibly due to the fact that the contacts they had with Urartu, were through the people of the tribe of Armen.

The kingdom fought mainly with the Assyrians and under Sarduri II and Argishti II defeated the Assyrians and drove them to their heartlands, cutting them off North and East. Their successors however would prove incapable of maintaining the Empire and after the death of Argishti II the Empire lost a successive war to Assyria and would later become a vassal of the Medes.

== Antiquity ==
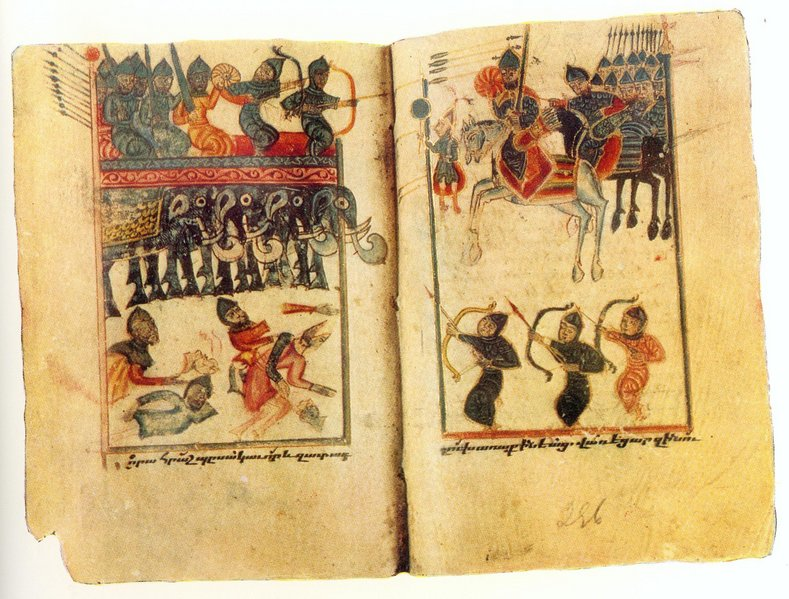
A 15th century miniature depicting the Battle of Avarayr. Fought in 451, the battle saw Christian Armenians battle against the Sasanian Empire.

=== Artaxiad dynasty ===
An Armenian Hellenistic state was founded in 190 BC and ruled by the Artaxiad dynasty. At the height of its power, Greater Armenia spread over parts of what is today the Caucasus, Turkey, Syria, and Lebanon. After its expansion under the leadership of Tigranes II, it confronted the Republic of Rome. Although it briefly lost its independence, it reaffirmed itself in the region with the Arsacid dynasty of Armenia. From then on, Romans and Persians both tried to create close relations with the Armenians. Although the Arsacid dynasty was of Iranian origin, it severed its relations with Persia when the rival Sassanid dynasty took over, and further when Armenia accepted Christianity in 301. While under Persian control, in 451, the battle of Vartanantz was fought by Armenians against the Persians in order to resist forced conversion to Zoroastrianism. Although a military defeat, the Persians afterwards allowed the Armenians to freely practice Christianity.

=== The army of Tigranes II ===
Tigranes II had massed a large army in his quest to extend the borders of Armenia.

According to the author of Judith, his army included chariots and 12,000 cavalrymen, probably indicating heavy cavalry or cataphracts, commonly used by Seleucids and Parthians. He also had 120,000 infantrymen and 12,000 mounted archers, which were also an important feature of the Parthian army. Like the Seleucids, the bulk of Tigranes' army were the foot soldiers. The Jewish historian Josephus talks of over 500,000 men in total on their march and conquest into Seleucia and Nabatea, including the camp followers. These latter were the camels, donkeys, and mules for the baggage; innumerable sheep, cattle, and goats for the food supply which was abundant for each man, and much gold and silver. As a result, the marching Armenian army was "a huge, irregular force, too many to count, like locusts or the dust of the earth". It was thus, not unlike the Eastern hordes. Regardless, the smaller Cappadocian, Graeco-Phoenician, and Nabatean armies were no match for the sheer number of soldiers. However, the organized Roman army with its legions posed a much greater challenge to the Armenians.

Note that the numbers given by Israelite historians of the time were probably exaggerated, considering the fact that the Hasmonean Jews lost the war against Tigranes.

Plutarch wrote that the Armenian archers could kill from 200 meters with their deadly accurate arrows. The Romans admired and respected the bravery and the warrior spirit of the Armenian Cavalry -- the hardcore of Tigran's Army. The Roman historian Sallustius Crispus wrote that the Armenian [Ayrudzi - lit. horsemen] Cavalry was "remarkable by the beauty of their horses and armor" Horses in Armenia, since ancient times were considered as the most important part and pride of the warrior.

=== Armenian cavalry ===
Armenian horsemen were used by both Armenia, and also by nearby kingdoms or empires such as Pontus, Parthia, Persia, and the Roman Empire.

Chapot wrote:

"What they say about Armenia bewilders us. How could this mountain people develop such a cavalry that was able to measure itself against the horsemen of the Medes? One thing which is certain is the fact that Armenia was a source of excellent well bred horses. The people in this country had discovered that horses were not just an economic asset, but could also be used for military purposes."

In Sassanid Persia, the Armenians were accorded a status similar to the elite "Savaran" of the Persian army. The equipment of the Armenian cavalry was similar to that of the Savaran. Pro-Sassanian Armenian cavalry units fought under Sassanid banners and were allowed to enter the royal capital, Ctesiphon. The Armenians were in fact honoured for their services. For example, general Smbat Bagratuni was accorded particular honor and attention by Khosrow II. In 619, due to his victory over the Turks who then resided in Central Asia, he was given gifts, such as lavishly decorated robes, and the command of a number of the king's royal guards. Khosrow II also raised him to third in rank among the nobles of the court. Moreover, pro-Sassanian Armenians supplied excellent light cavalry and infantry, who were notable for using slings to repel enemy cavalry, and spears for close combat.

== Early Middle Ages ==
=== Armenia in the Byzantine Empire ===
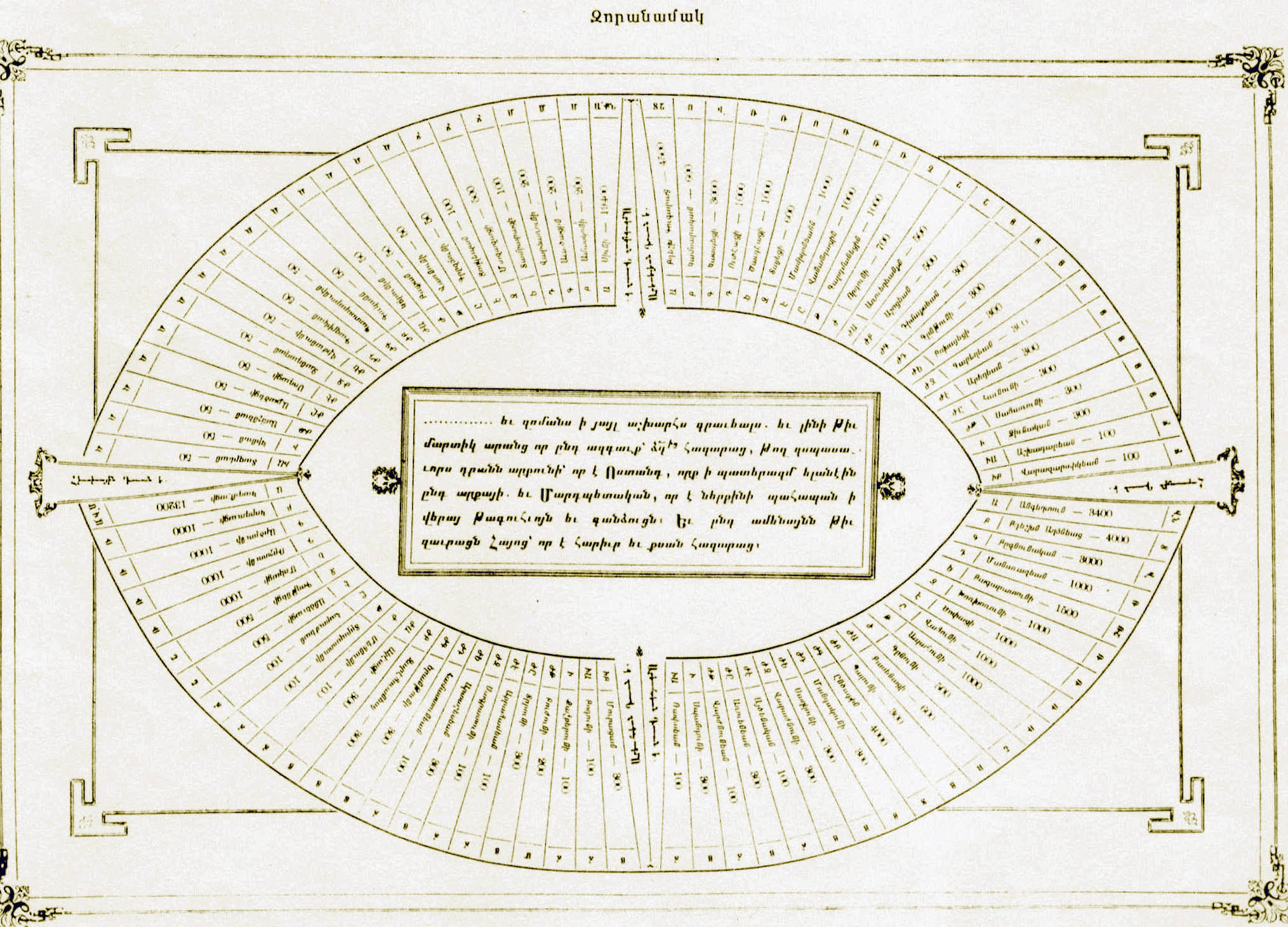
Zoranamak, military Register of the Kingdom of Armenia before 428 AD

During the Byzantine occupation of Western Armenia, the Armenians were considered an important element of the Byzantine army. As a result, they were encouraged to settle in distant regions of the Byzantine Empire in order to serve there. For example, in the 6th century, Emperor Maurice encouraged Armenians to settle around Pergamum in Western Anatolia. The Armenian troops became more and more important towards the 7th century; 2000 formed an armoured cavalry elite on the Danube frontier against the Avars, a nomadic people who were invading Europe. Others even defended the imperial capital of Constantinople.

In sixth century Narses, one of great generals of Justinian I, along with other victories succeeded in reconquering Italy from Ostgoths.

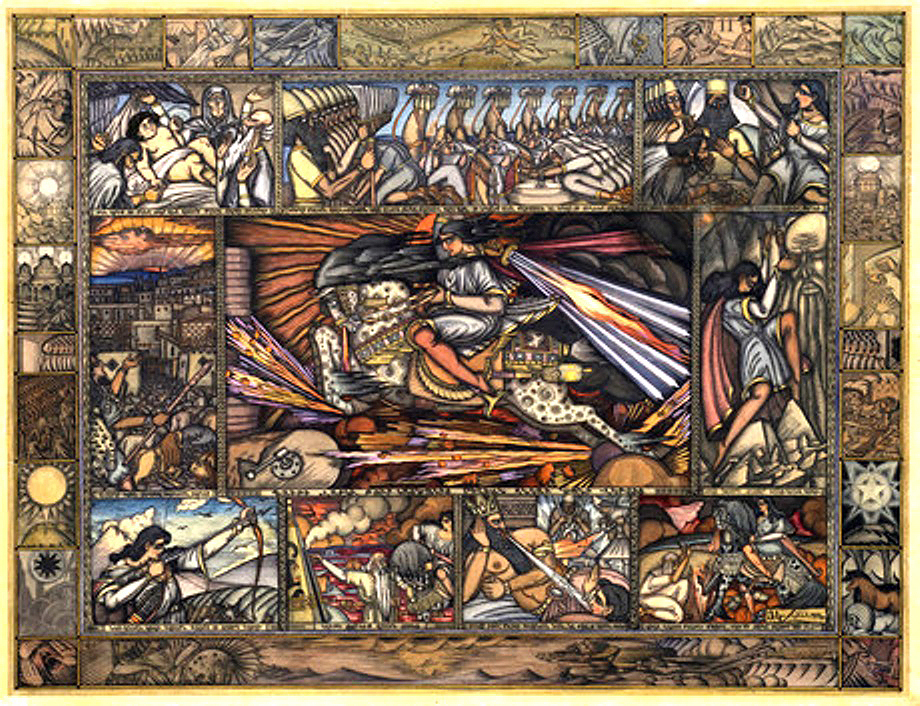
Depiction of David of Sassoun. A central figure in the Armenian epic poem, Daredevils of Sassoun, it looks at his struggles against Arab rule.

=== Traditional Armenian arms and armour ===
"David of Sassoun" is an Armenian national epic that developed towards the Middle Ages during the Arab occupation of Armenia. Traditional Armenian arms and armour seem to be reflected in it. In this oral tale, the warrior wears a padded helmet, a mail shirt, and a lamellar cuirass plus metal leg defenses and a large shield. His weapons include sword, spear, bow and arrows, but primary importance goes to the mace. Constant reference to such weapons being thrown by horsemen, and even of a mace pinning a rider's leg to his saddle, seem to suggest that later transmitters of this oral tale might have been confusing the mace "gurz" with a heavy javelin known in Iran as "guzar". Javelin-combat between horsemen with blunted weapons is still a popular game in Eastern Anatolia, where it is known as "cerit".

=== Bagratid Kingdom of Armenia ===
Following Byzantine occupation of Western Armenia, Sassanid occupation of Eastern Armenia, and subsequent Arab conquest of the region, the Armenians reestablished their sovereignty over their ancestral lands in the form of the Bagratid Kingdom of Armenia.

In Armenia, local nakharars were able to raise 25,000 to 40,000 men, but such a levy was rare. The country was strongly fortified. It is said that seventy castles defended the province of Vaspurakan, near Lake Van. There existed a special regiment of mountaineers who were trained to roll rocks onto their foes. In siege warfare, Armenians used iron hooks to help them climb fortification walls, and large leather shields to protect them from anything that would be dropped from above. Each nakharar led a force of free men under his own coat-of-arms. Armenians were well equipped for the time, as their country was rich in iron. The Armenian army also consisted of heavy cavalry called Ayruzdi. These Ayruzdi were said to be the strongest cavalry force of the time. Levies were recruited from the commoners in Armenia. Christian Armenian levies would fight for Christianity for any of the Christian armies of the time. It is said that most of Vartan Mamikonian's army were Christian levies

==== Fortifications of Ani ====
During the reign of King Ashot III, Ani became the capital of Armenia. It was a naturally protected city, built on a triangular plateau, its only vulnerable part being the north. In order to protect the future capital of Armenia and its inhabitants, the king built defenses across the narrowest point of the site. However, upon being declared capital of the kingdom, the city expanded quickly. Consequently, a line of massive double walls were built further to the north during the reign of King Smbat II. These northern walls are the most impressive part of Ani. The rest of the city was also well protected by fortifications and towers.

== High Middle Ages ==
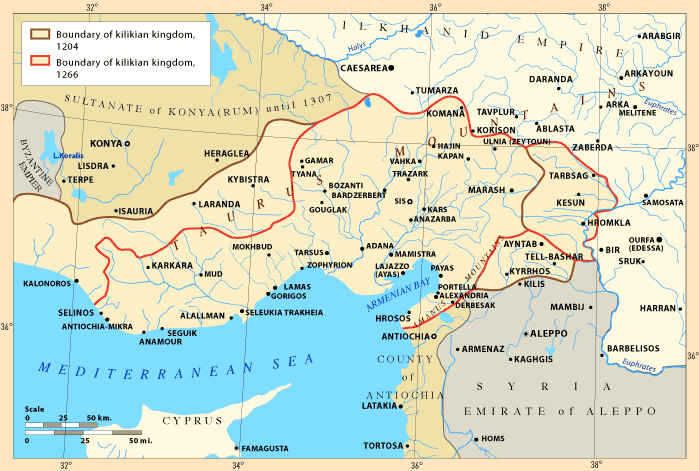
Map of the Armenian Kingdom of Cilicia, 1199–1375.

=== Involvement in the Byzantine army ===
In the late tenth and early eleventh centuries, Armenian involvement in the Byzantine army came from three different sources: "allied" contingents from Bagratid Armenia, soldiers regularly recruited by the Byzantine army, as well as emigrants from Arab-controlled parts of Armenia. The fall of Bagratid Armenia and the subsequent dispersion of Armenians throughout Eastern Anatolia filled the ranks of the Byzantine army with Armenian military units or tagmata Armeniôn. In this period, some dukes of Antioch, as well as those of Chaldia and Mesopotamia were thought to have such units under their command. Because of the Armenian presence in the Byzantine military in those areas, these three "themes" or districts were called armenika themata. An Armenian contingent in the Byzantine army fought and terrorized the Arabs of Crete in 960-961 when Nicephorus Phocas invaded the island, and in 965, a contingent was sent to Cilicia as well. Under John Tzimisces, an Armenian contingent also participated in the campaigns against the Rus in 971, and under Basil II, in 986, there was an Armenian participation in the campaigns against the Bulgars. Armenian mercenaries were also present in the Byzantine capital of Constantinople, and there existed Armenian military colonies in Cyprus.

When the Byzantine Empire took over Bagratid Armenia in 1045, and with the subsequent Seljuk conquest of the area, a large number of Armenians moved elsewhere. Most of these fleeing families settled in and around Cilicia where they established a kingdom, while some moved further south, to Egypt, and others went to the Balkans, Crimea, and Poland.

=== Involvement in the Egyptian army ===
Although most Armenians were Christians, they played a significant role in nearby Muslim nations, such as Egypt. Some Muslim Armenian mercenaries were employed by the Egyptian Tulunids towards the end of the 9th century. Armenian troops also served in Hamdanid, Mirdasid, and Fatimid forces. When Byzantium subjugated the Bagratid Armenian kingdom, many Armenians migrated to Egypt and formed a large corps of infantry archers under Muslim Armenian leadership. Eventually, Armenian troops seized control of Cairo in 1073–1074. Their leader thus took important positions in the Fatimid administration, in the context of which more Armenians were recruited in the Egyptian army. This recruitment was reduced after the Seljuk Turks and Crusaders made their arrival.

=== Georgian rule ===
Armenia was occupied by the Great Seljuk Empire until 1123, when the Kingdom of Georgia liberated some Armenian areas after Armenian liberation. Armenia became part of the feudal land of Kingdom of Georgia and noble Georgian-Armenian family of Mkhergrdzeli (Zakaryan) had a significant role in a country. Starting in 1190, the Mkhargrdzelis rose quickly in power. In the ninth year of Tamar's reign the Mandaturtukhutsesi and Amirspasalar Zakaria Mkhargrdzeli and his brother Ivane the atabag took Dvin in 1193. They also took Gelakun, Bijnisi, Amberd, and Bargushat, and all the towns above the city of Ani, up to the bridge of Khodaafarin bridge.

In 1195 when Eldiguzids invaded in the kingdom. Armenian troops joined the feudal army of Georgia under command of David Soslan. General battle was held in 1195 near Shamkor (Battle of Shamkor). Abu-Bakr, reinforced by his client Muslim emirs, met the enemy at the well-fortified city of Shamkor on June 1, 1195. David Soslan sent a relatively small force to break through the gates of the city, while he led the main Georgian troops to raid deep in the enemy's rear. However, poor roads and difficult landscape were setback for the Georgians, and the Atabeg defended the city for a while. Nevertheless, David Soslan's maneuver proved to be decisive and Abu Bakr's army was severely defeated. Shamkor was eventually captured by the Georgians who then chased the enemy's soldiers up to the city of Ganja which in its turn fell to the victors.

Around the year 1199, they took the city of Ani, and in 1201, Georgian ruling queen Tamar gave Ani to them as a fief.

=== Armenian Kingdom of Cilicia ===
The Armenian Kingdom of Cilicia was founded during the Middle Ages by Armenians fleeing from the Byzantines, and later, the Seljuk Turks. The Cilician Armenians, being Christian, were at times allied with Frankish crusaders during the First Crusade. In the context of the friendly Crusader-Armenian relations, they adopted European traditions, even in their military garments and strategies.

According to contemporary chroniclers, there were up to 100,000 men in the Cilician Armenian army, a third of which was cavalry. At the time, Armenian heavy cavalry bore heavy resemblances to their Frankish counterparts, and the equipment used by the Armenian army was more and more akin to that used by the Europeans. The Armenians provided great help in the Crusaders' military campaigns in the Levant. In fact, the Crusaders employed Armenian siege engineers throughout their campaigns. For example, a certain specialist named "Havedic" (Latinized form of "Avedis") designed the machines used to attack Tyre in 1124.

Leo II introduced important changes in Cilician Armenian military organization, which until then was similar to that the Armenian kingdoms of Greater Armenia. The "nakharars", Armenian feudal nobles, lost much of their old autonomy. The names and functions of regional leaders were Latinized, and many facets of the army structure were inspired or copied from the Crusader states, particularly from the nearby principality of Antioch.

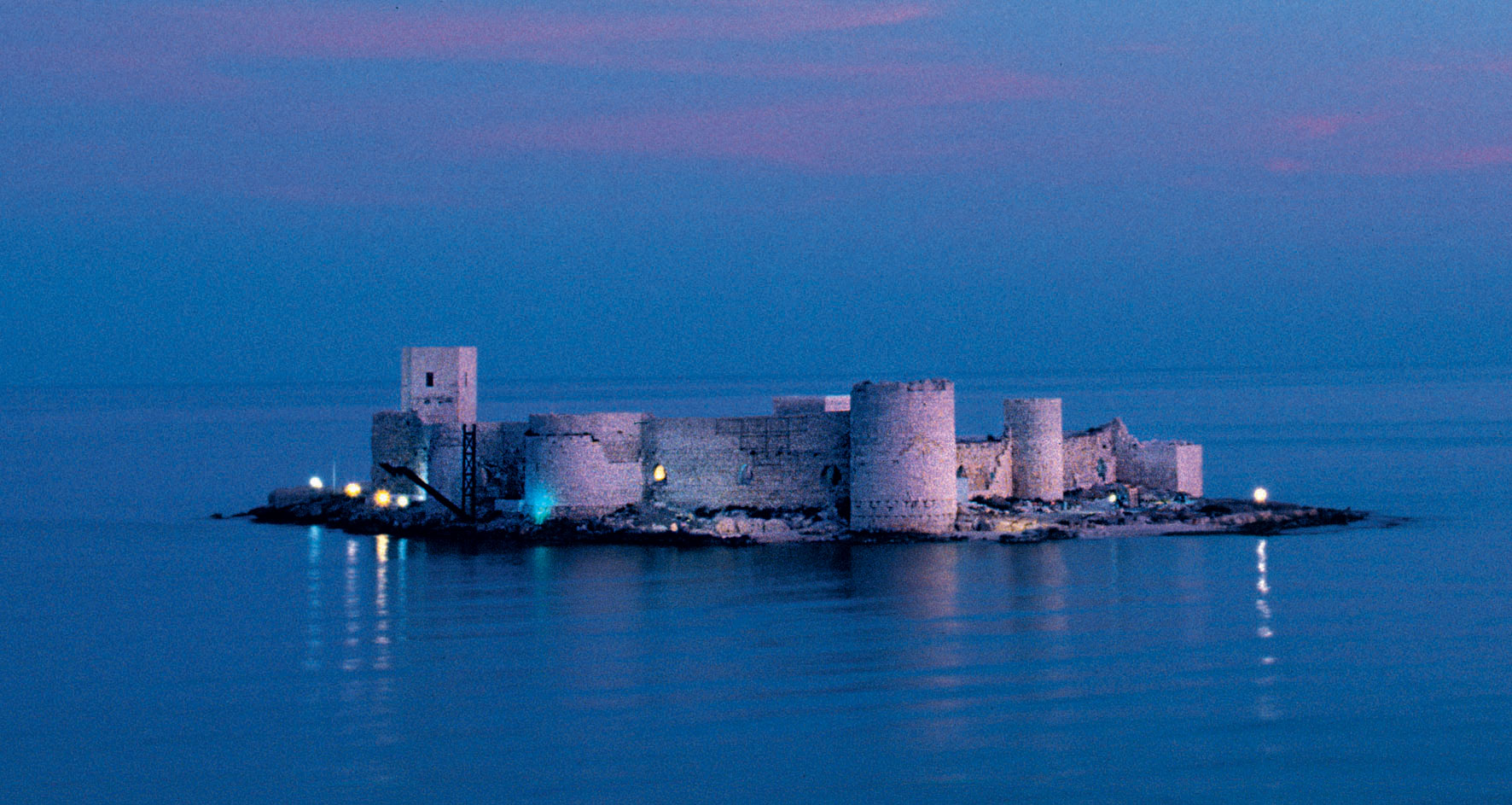
A 13th century Cilician Armenian fortress (pictured in 2006).

==== Fortifications in Cilician Armenia ====
Most Armenian fortification in Cilicia are characterized by multiple bailey walls laid with irregular plans to follow the sinuosities of the outcrops, rounded and especially horseshoe-shaped towers, finely-cut often rusticated ashlar facing stones, a complex bent entrance with a slot machicolation, embrasured loopholes for archers, barrel or pointed vaults over undercrofts, gates and chapels, and cisterns with elaborate scarped drains. In the immediate proximity of many fortifications are the remains of civilian settlements. Some of the important castles in the Armenian Kingdom include: Sis, Anavarza, Vahka, Yılankale, Sarvandikar, Kuklak, T‛il Hamtun, Hadjin, Lampron, and Gaban (modern Geben). Armenian design ideas influenced castle building in nearby Crusader states, such as the Principality of Antioch, where fortifications ranged from tiny hilltop outposts to major garrison fortresses. Antioch attracted few European settlers, and thus they relied heavily on military elites of Greek, Syrian, and Armenian origin, who probably influenced the design of local fortifications.

== Ottoman-Iranian Rule ==
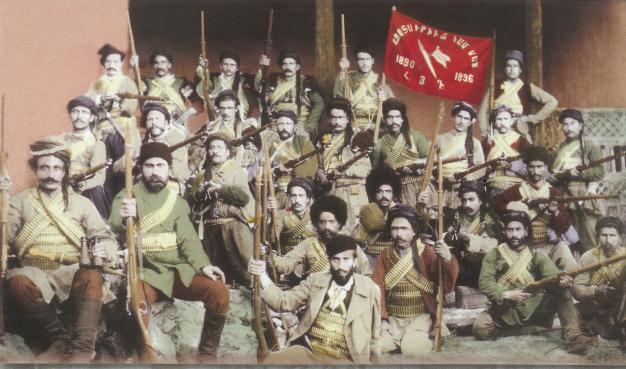
A fedayi group fighting under the ARF banner, ca. 1890s. Fedayi groups were raised in defence of Armenian villages against tribal Kurdish, and Hamidian forces.

In 1375, the Egyptian Mamelukes took over Cilician Armenia, effectively ending Armenian sovereignty. The Ottoman Empire eventually established its rule over Cilicia with its conquest of the Mamluk Sultanate under Selim I. The khachen principality which was Armenias last bastion of independence managed to resist and manage rule after successive rule of the Seljuks, Mongol Empire, Ilkhanate, the Timurids and the Ak and Kara Koyunlu, Armenia was conquered by the emerging Safavid state of king Ismail I. In 1555 with the Peace of Amasya, and decisively with the Treaty of Zuhab (1639), the Ottomans gained Western Armenia, while Eastern Armenia remained under Persian rule. Many Armenians served in the armies of both empires. Many Armenians were enlisted in the elite gholam corps of the Safavids. The Ottoman Army at its earlier stage enjoyed the service of Armenian infantry archers who relied on an old-fashioned composite bow. They wore muted colors or black as a result of the Ottoman laws which reserved brighter costume for the Turkish elite. Later on, some Armenian children were raised as Janissaries. The eastern part of the traditional Armenian lands was conquered by Imperial Russia from Qajar Iran, as confirmed in 1828 by the Treaty of Turkmenchay.

=== Armenian militia ===
The Armenian militia were irregular units who voluntarily left their families in order to fight and defend Armenian villages and city quarters from Ottoman aggression and massacres. There were often only a handful of "fedayees" during their battles against the Ottoman troops and Kurdish irregulars. Their distant goal was to gain Armenian autonomy (Armenakan) or independence (Dashnaks, Hunchaks) depending on their ideology and degree of oppression received by Armenians. Some of them also helped the Iranian revolutionaries during their revolution.

== World War I ==
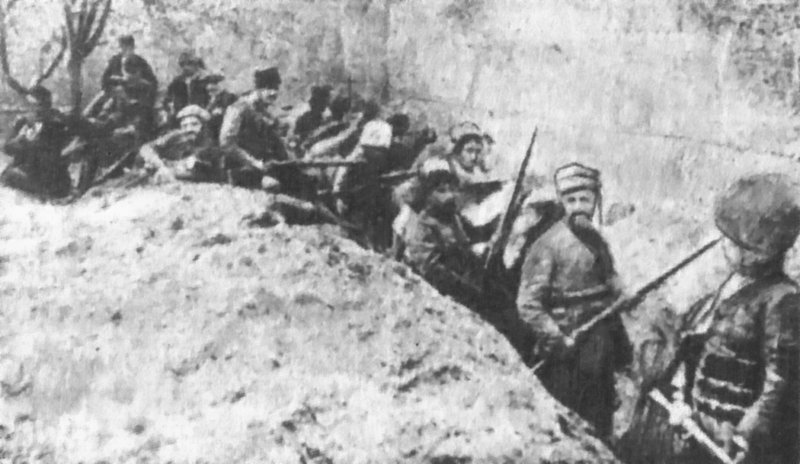
Armenian civilians holding a defense line against Ottoman forces during the defence of Van, in 1915.

The Armenian people were subjected to a genocide by the Young Turk government during World War I. Between 1.5 million and 2 million men, women and children were killed. Armenians often resisted the actions of the Turkish government, such as during the Van Resistance.

With the establishment of the Democratic Republic of Armenia, in the Caucasus Campaign after the collapse of the Russian Empire and Army, the newly organized army fought a couple of battles against the Ottoman Empire. Victory at the Battle of Sardarapat proved that the Armenians were a capable power, but ultimately the Armenians were forced to surrender most of their land and weapons. During the same time, the Democratic Republic of Armenia also faced the Georgian-Armenian War 1918 and Armenian-Azeri war 1918.

=== Aftermath ===
In 1920, Armenia fought a series of battles with Turkey during the Turkish-Armenian War. After an invasion by the Soviet Red Army, Armenia was absorbed in 1921 by the Soviet Union.

== World War II ==
Armenia participated in the Second World War on the side of the Allies under the Soviet Union. Armenia was spared the devastation and destruction that wrought most of the western Soviet Union during the Great Patriotic War of World War II. The Nazis never reached the South Caucasus, which they intended to do in order to capture the oil fields in Azerbaijan. Still, Armenia played a valuable role in aiding the allies both through industry and agriculture. An estimated 300,000–500,000 Armenians served in the war, almost half of whom did not return. Armenia thus had one of the highest death tolls, per capita, among the other Soviet republics.

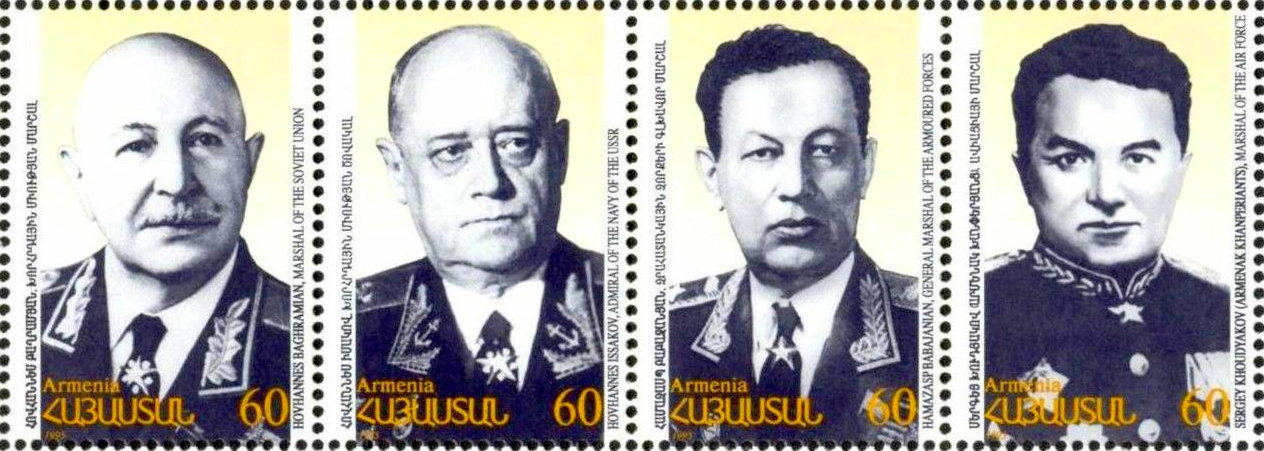
Armenian Marshals and Admiral of World War II on stamps: Bagramyan, Isakov, Babadzhanian, Khudyakov

A total of 117 citizens of Armenia including 10 non ethnic Armenians were awarded Hero of the Soviet Union. Of these, 36 had been killed in action and were awarded this title posthumously. 27 Armenian soldiers and sergeants were also awarded the Order of Glory, and a total of 66,802 participants from Armenia were awarded orders and medals of the Soviet Union. Armenians living in the areas occupied regions of the Soviet Union formed partisan groups to combat the Germans. Over sixty Armenians were promoted to the rank of general, and with an additional four eventually achieving the rank of Marshal of the Soviet Union. Hovhannes Bagramyan was both the first non-Slavic Marshal and commander to hold the position of front commander when he was assigned to be the commander of the First Baltic Front in 1943. Admiral Ivan Isakov became the second Admiral of the fleet of the Soviet Union. Hamazasp Babadzhanian was the second of only two Chief Marshal of the Tank and Armored Troops. Sergei Khudyakov had been among the third to be Marshal of Aviation. Sergey Aganov became the fifth Marshal of the Engineering Troops

Six special military divisions were formed in Soviet Armenia in 1941–42, partly because so many draftees from the republic could not understand Russian. These six divisions alone had more than 67,000 soldiers. Five of them, the 89th, 409th, 408th, 390th, and 76th Divisions, would have a distinguished war record, while the sixth(261st Rifle Division) was ordered to stay in Armenia to guard the republic's western borders against a possible incursion by neighboring Turkey. The 89th Tamanyan Division, composed of ethnic Armenians, distinguished itself during the war. Led by Major General Nver Safaryan, it fought in the Battle of Berlin and entered Berlin. Many Armenian soldiers also served in two other multi-ethnic divisions. They came not only from Soviet Armenia, but also from the other Soviet republics and other countries with considerable Armenian minorities.

The Armenian SSR provided weapons and rebuilt broken airplanes. Workers donated to the Defense Fund 216,000,000 rubles. Armenia, as a gift, sent to the front 45 wagons of provisions. Armenian communities in the Middle East and the West also donated considerable sums of money to the Soviet government to help construct a series of tanks for the Red Army. These tanks were named after David of Sasun, the hero of an Armenian medieval epic, and Marshal Bagramyan.

Outside of Armenia and the Soviet Union, Missak Manouchian was one of the leaders of the French Resistance. He was captured and executed by the Nazis in 1944, together with over 20 members of FTP-MOI Paris region led by Manouchian, and remains a much respected figure in modern French history. Decorated soldiers who fought in the United States Army include Ernest H. Dervishian (recipient of the Medal of Honor), Harry Kizirian (most decorated serviceman from Rhode Island and one of the most decorated marines of the war), and Victor Maghakian (one of the most decorated American soldiers of the war). Brothers Noel Agazarian and Jack Agazarian both served in the British Royal Air Force, Noel was promoted to Flying Officer and participated in the Battle of Britain before being killed in action in 1941, while Jack also became a field agent for the Secret Intelligence Service and was captured and executed in 1945. Their sister, Monique Agazarian, became one of only 10 young women accepted into the Air Transport Auxiliary for ab initio pilot-training.

Gevork Vartanian was an intelligence agent responsible for thwarting Operation Long Jump, and thus preventing the assassination of Joseph Stalin, Winston Churchill, and Franklin D. Roosevelt at the Tehran Conference in 1943.

During World War II, about 18,500 Armenians served in the armed forces of the United States. A number of them were decorated for their service, including Col. Ernest Dervishian, a native of Virginia, who was awarded the Medal of Honor. US Marine Harry Kizirian is considered the most decorated soldier of the state of Rhode Island. Another Marine captain, Victor Maghakian, is considered one of the most decorated American soldiers of the war. The highest-ranking Armenian-American during World War II was Brigadier General Haig Shekerjian (who had previously served in the Pancho Villa Expedition and as an American military attache in the Middle Eastern theater of World War I). He was appointed commanding general of Camp Sibert, Alabama, which was used extensively as the main training camp for chemical warfare troops, and remained in that position until 1945. Shekerjian also gave numerous speeches during the war encouraging Americans of Armenian descent to enlist.

On the Axis side, the Armenische Legion was created within the Wehrmacht, which consisted mainly of Soviet prisoners of war, who had opted to fight for German forces rather than be sent to the Nazi POW camps or killed. The legion was led by former Defence Minister of Armenia General Drastamat Kanayan, who fought against the Soviet Union on the Eastern Front. Kanayan was among the minority in the legion who volunteered, under the hope of freeing Armenia from Soviet control. The total number of Armenians serving in the German armed forces during the war reached 33,000: 14,000 were placed in field battalions, while another 7,000 served in logistical and other non-combat units. The legion participated in the occupation of the Crimean Peninsula and the Caucasus. It did not take part in the Holocaust, on the contrary several Jewish soldiers captured as POWs were saved by some of the Armenians in the Legion. Several instances included Jews being sent to the battalion to evade detection by the Nazis. Towards the end of the war, many of the legion deserted, defected or revolted. In spite of Nazi Germany acknowledging the Armenians were an Indo-European (or Aryan) people, Adolf Hitler personally stated, "I don't trust the Armenians."

An estimated 600,000 Armenians served in World War 2 from all over the world.

As of 2005, some 9,000 veterans of the war were still living in Armenia.

== Republic of Artsakh (Nagorno-Karabakh Republic) ==
During the 20th century, Nagorno-Karabakh had been denied an Armenian identity by the succeeding Russian, British, and Azeri rulers.

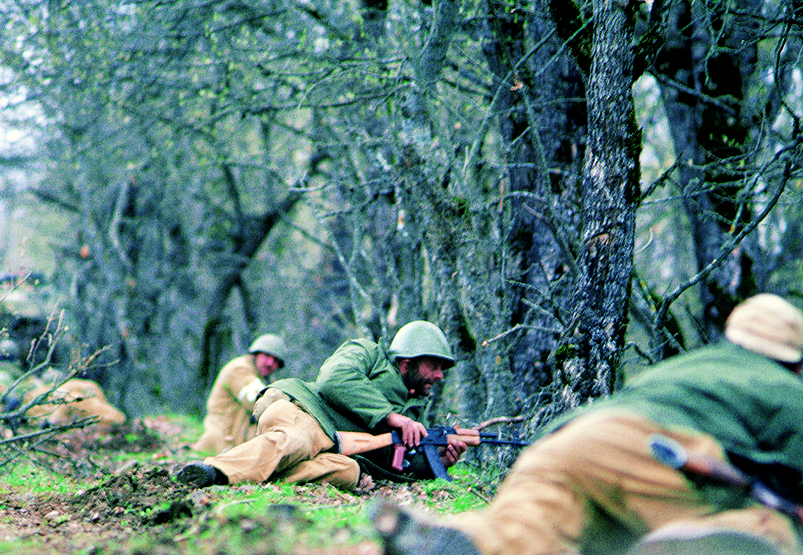
Armenian forces in Nagorno-Karabakh during the First Nagorno-Karabakh War, in 1994.

The Armenians of Nagorno-Karabakh had accused the Soviet Azerbaijani government of conducting forced ethnic cleansing of the region. The majority Armenian population, with ideological and material support from Armenia, started a movement to transfer the territory to Armenia. The issue was at first a "war of words" in 1987. In a December 1991 referendum, the people of Nagorno-Karabakh approved the creation of an independent state. A Soviet proposal for enhanced autonomy for Nagorno-Karabakh within Azerbaijan satisfied neither side. After the dissolution of the Soviet Union in 1991, a war for independence of the Republic of Artsakh erupted between the Armenians and Azerbaijan, which claimed the area.

In the post-Soviet power vacuum, military action between Azerbaijan and Armenia was heavily influenced by the Russian military. Furthermore, the Azeri military employed a large number of mercenaries from Ukraine and from Russia. As many as one thousand Afghan mujaheddin participated in the fighting. There were also fighters from Chechnya fighting on the side of Azerbaijan.

By the end of 1993, the conflict had caused thousands of casualties and created hundreds of thousands of refugees on both sides. By May 1994 the Armenians were in control of 14% of the territory of Azerbaijan. As a result, the Azerbaijanis started direct negotiations with the Karabakhi authorities. A cease-fire was reached on May 12, 1994, through Russian negotiation. But, a final resolution to the conflict has yet to be realized.

== Timeline of notable events ==
Victories are in light gray, losses are in red.

War/battle	Opponent	Part of	Date	Armed Force
Urartu-Assyrian Wars	Neo-Assyrian Empire		714-627 BC	Kingdom of Urartu
Battle of Gaugamela	Macedonia	Wars of Alexander the Great	331 BC	Yervanduni Kingdom of Armenia
Battle of Protopachium	Roman Republic	First Mithridatic War	89 BC	Artashesian Kingdom of Armenia
Armenian-Parthian War	Parthian Empire		87-85 BC	Artashesian Kingdom of Armenia
Battle of Tigranocerta	Roman Republic	Third Mithridatic War	69 BC	Artashesian Kingdom of Armenia
Battle of Artaxata	Roman Republic	Third Mithridatic War	68 BC	Artashesian Kingdom of Armenia
Armenian-Iberian War	Caucasian Iberia		51-53 AD	Arshakuni Kingdom of Armenia
War of the Armenian Succession	Roman Empire	Roman–Parthian Wars	58-63 AD	Arshakuni Kingdom of Armenia
Battle of Bagrevand	Sassanid Empire		371	Arshakuni Kingdom of Armenia
Battle of Avarayr	Sassanid Empire		451	Armenian rebels
Battle of Varnakert	Umayyad Caliphate		702	Armenian rebels
Battle of Bagrevand	Abbasid Caliphate		775	Armenian rebels
Battle of Karasounk	Abbasid Caliphate		863	Armenian rebels
Battle of Sevan	Sajid Emirate of Azerbaijan		924	Bagratuni Kingdom of Armenia
Battle of Ani	Byzantine Empire		1042	Bagratuni Kingdom of Armenia
Battle of Azaz (1125)	Seljuk Empire	Crusades	1125	Cilician Kingdom of Armenia
Battle of Mamistra	Byzantine Empire		1152	Cilician Kingdom of Armenia
Siege of Acre (1189–1191)	Ayyubid dynasty	Crusades	1189-1191	Cilician Kingdom of Armenia
Battle of Ain Jalut	Mamluk Sultanate	Mongol invasions of the Levant	1260	Cilician Kingdom of Armenia
Battle of Garni	Khwarezmid Empire		1225	Zakarian Principality of Armenia
Siege of Baghdad (1258)	Abbasid Caliphate	Mongol invasions of the Levant	1258	Cilician Kingdom of Armenia
Battle of Ain Jalut	Mamluk Sultanate	Mongol invasions of the Levant	1260	Cilician Kingdom of Armenia
Siege of Aleppo (1260)	Mamluk Sultanate	Mongol invasions of the Levant	1260	Cilician Kingdom of Armenia
Battle of Mari	Mamluk Sultanate		1266	Cilician Kingdom of Armenia
Second Battle of Sarvandik'ar	Mamluk Sultanate		1276	Cilician Kingdom of Armenia
Second Battle of Homs	Mamluk Sultanate	Mongol invasions of the Levant	1281	Cilician Kingdom of Armenia
Battle of Wadi al-Khaznadar	Mamluk Sultanate	Mongol invasions of the Levant	1299	Cilician Kingdom of Armenia
Battle of Marj al-Saffar (1303)	Mamluk Sultanate	Mongol invasions of the Levant	1303	Cilician Kingdom of Armenia
Battle of Halidzor	Ottoman Empire	Armenian national liberation movement	March 1726	Armenian militiamen under Davit Bek
First Zeitun Resistance	Ottoman Empire	Armenian national liberation movement	August 1862	Armenian fedayi
First Sasun Resistance	Ottoman Empire	Armenian national liberation movement, Hamidian massacres	August 1894	Social Democrat Hunchakian Party
Second Zeitun Resistance	Ottoman Empire	Hamidian massacres	October 1895-January 1896	Social Democrat Hunchakian Party
First Van Resistance	Ottoman Empire	Hamidian massacres	June 3–11, 1896	Armenian civilians, Armenakan Party
Khanasor Expedition	Kurds of Khanasor	Armenian national liberation movement	July 25–27, 1897	Armenian Revolutionary Federation, assisted by Social Democrat Hunchakian Party, Armenakan Party
Battle of Khasdour	Ottoman Empire	Armenian national liberation movement	1899	Armenian Revolutionary Federation
Battle of Holy Apostles Monastery	Ottoman Empire	Armenian national liberation movement	November 3–27, 1901	Armenian fedayi
Second Sasun Resistance	Ottoman Empire	Armenian national liberation movement	March–April, 1904	Armenian Revolutionary Federation
Battle of Sulukh	Ottoman Empire	Armenian national liberation movement	May 27, 1907	Armenian Revolutionary Federation
Third Zeitun Resistance	Ottoman Empire	Armenian resistance during the Armenian genocide	August 30, 1914 – March 25, 1915	Social Democrat Hunchakian Party
Second Van Resistance	Ottoman Empire	Armenian resistance during the Armenian genocide	April 19-May 17, 1915	Armenian civilians, Armenian Revolutionary Federation & Armenakan Party
Battle of Salmas	Ottoman Empire	Persian Campaign of World War I	April 19-May 17, 1915	Caucasus Army of the Russian Empire, Armenian volunteer units
Shabin-Karahisar Resistance	Ottoman Empire	Armenian resistance during the Armenian genocide	June 2–30, 1915	Social Democrat Hunchakian Party
Musa Ler Resistance	Ottoman Empire	Armenian resistance during the Armenian genocide	July 21-September 12, 1915	Armenian civilians
First Urfa Resistance	Ottoman Empire	Armenian resistance during the Armenian genocide	September 29-October 20, 1915	Armenian civilians
Armenian-Azerbaijani War	Azerbaijan		March 30, 1918 – April 28, 1920	(First Republic of Armenia) Republic of Armenia, Central Caspian Dictatorship & Armenian Revolutionary Federation
Battle of Bash Abaran	Ottoman Empire	Caucasus Campaign of World War I	May 21–24, 1918	(First Republic of Armenia) Armenian volunteer units
Battle of Sardarapat	Ottoman Empire	Caucasus Campaign of World War I	May 22–26, 1918	(First Republic of Armenia) Armenian volunteer units
Battle of Gharakilise	Ottoman Empire	Caucasus Campaign of World War I	May 25–28, 1918	(First Republic of Armenia) Armenian volunteer units
Battle of Arara	Ottoman Empire	Sinai and Palestine Campaign of World War I	September 19, 1918	(First Republic of Armenia) French Armenian Legion
Armenian-Georgian War	Georgia		October 17-December 31, 1918	(First Republic of Armenia) Republic of Armenia
Marash Resistance	Ottoman Empire	Cilicia Campaign of Turkish War of Independence	January 21-February 13, 1920	(First Republic of Armenia) French Armenian Legion
Second Urfa Resistance	Ottoman Empire	Cilicia Campaign of Turkish War of Independence	February 9-April 11, 1920	(First Republic of Armenia) French Armenian Legion
Aintab Resistance	Ottoman Empire	Cilicia Campaign of Turkish War of Independence	April 1, 1920 – February 9, 1921	(First Republic of Armenia) French Armenian Legion
Armenian-Turkish War	Ottoman Empire	Turkish War of Independence	June 16-December 2, 1920	Republic of Armenia
Armenian-Soviet War	Russian SFSR	Russian Civil War	September–November 29, 1920	(First Republic of Armenia) Republic of Armenia
Anti-Soviet Resistance	Russian SFSR		February 13, 1921 – July 13, 1921	Armenian Revolutionary Federation (until April 26); Republic of Mountainous Armenia (after April 26)
First Nagorno-Karabakh War	Azerbaijan	Post-Soviet conflicts	February 13, 1988 – May 12, 1994	Republic of Artsakh Republic of Armenia
Second Nagorno-Karabakh War	Azerbaijan Turkey	Post-Soviet conflicts	September 27, 2020 – November 10, 2020	Republic of Artsakh Republic of Armenia

== See also ==
- Armed Forces of Armenia
- Armenian Air Force
- History of Armenia
- List of wars involving Armenia
- List of battles involving Armenia
- Military history of the Republic of Artsakh

== Sources ==
- Blow, David (2009). Shah Abbas: The Ruthless King Who became an Iranian Legend. London, UK: I. B. Tauris & Co. Ltd. ISBN 978-1-84511-989-8. LCCN 2009464064.
- Elishe: History of Vardan and the Armenian War, transl. R.W. Thomson, Cambridge, Mass. 1982
- Dr. Abd al-Husayn Zarrin’kub "Ruzgaran:tarikh-i Iran az aghz ta saqut saltnat Pahlvi" Sukhan, 1999. ISBN 964-6961-11-8
- Vahan Kurkjian - Period of the Marzbans — Battle of Avarair
- Gevork Nazaryan - The struggle for Religious Freedom
- de Waal, Thomas. Black Garden: Armenia and Azerbaijan Through Peace and War. New York: New York University Press, 2003
