= Military history by country =

The following is a list of military history articles by country.

== A ==
- Military history of Abkhazia
- Military history of Afghanistan
- Military history of Albania
- Military history of Algeria
- Military history of Andorra
- Military history of Angola
- Military history of Antigua and Barbuda
- Military history of Argentina
- Military history of Armenia
- Military history of Australia
- Military history of Austria
- Military history of Azerbaijan

Back to top

== B ==
- Military history of the Bahamas
- Military history of Bahrain
- Military history of Bangladesh
- Military history of Barbados
- Military history of Belarus
- Military history of Belgium
- Military history of Belize
- Military history of Benin
- Military history of Bhutan
- Military history of Bolivia
- Military history of Bosnia and Herzegovina
- Military history of Botswana
- Military history of Brazil
- Military history of Brunei
- Military history of Bulgaria
- Military history of Burkina Faso
- Military history of Burundi

Back to top

== C ==
- Military history of Cambodia
- Military history of Cameroon
- Military history of Canada
- Military history of Cape Verde
- Military history of the Central African Republic
- Military history of Chad
- Military history of Chile
- Military history of China
  - Military history of the People's Republic of China
  - Military history of Hong Kong
  - Military history of Taiwan
  - Military history of the Republic of China
- Military history of Colombia
- Military history of Comoros
- Military history of the Democratic Republic of the Congo
- Military history of Republic of the Congo
- Military history of Costa Rica
- Military history of Côte d'Ivoire
- Military history of Croatia
- Military history of Cuba
- Military history of Cyprus
- Military history of the Czech Republic

Back to top

== D ==
- Military history of Denmark
- Military history of Djibouti
- Military history of the Dominican Republic

Back to top

== E ==
- Military history of East Timor
- Military history of Ecuador
- Military history of Egypt
- Military history of El Salvador
- Military history of England
- Military history of Equatorial Guinea
- Military history of Eritrea
- Military history of Estonia
- Military history of Eswatini
- Military history of Ethiopia

Back to top

== F ==
- Military history of Fiji
- Military history of Finland
- Military history of France

Back to top

== G ==
- Military history of Gabon
- Military history of the Gambia
- Military history of Georgia
- Military history of Germany
- Military history of Ghana
- Military history of Greece
- Military history of Grenada
- Military history of Guatemala
- Military history of Guinea
- Military history of Guinea-Bissau
- Military history of Guyana

Back to top

== H ==
- Military history of Haiti
- Military history of Honduras
- Military history of Hungary

Back to top

== I ==
- Military history of Iceland
- Military history of India
- Military history of Indonesia
- Military history of Iran
- Military history of Iraq
- Military history of Ireland
  - Military history of the Lordship of Ireland
  - Military history of the Kingdom of Ireland
  - Military history of Confederate Ireland
  - Military history of the Irish Republic
  - Military history of the Irish Free State
- Military history of Israel
- Military history of Italy

Back to top

== J ==
- Military history of Jamaica
- Military history of Japan
- Military history of Jordan

Back to top

== K ==
- Military history of Kazakhstan
- Military history of Kenya
- Military history of Kiribati
- Military history of Korea
  - Since the division of Korea in mid-1945 after World War II, Korea has been split into two countries: North Korea and South Korea. For post-1945 Korean military history, see military history of North Korea and military history of South Korea.
- Military history of Kuwait
- Military history of Kyrgyzstan

Back to top

== L ==
- Military history of Laos
- Military history of Latvia
- Military history of Lebanon
- Military history of Lesotho
- Military history of Liberia
- Military history of Libya
- Military history of Liechtenstein
- Military history of Lithuania
- Military history of Luxembourg

Back to top

== M ==
- Military history of Macedonia
- Military history of Madagascar
- Military history of Malawi
- Military history of Malaysia
- Military history of the Maldives
- Military history of Mali
- Military history of Malta
- Military history of the Marshall Islands
- Military history of Mauritania
- Military history of Mauritius
- Military history of Mexico
- Military history of the Federated States of Micronesia
- Military history of Moldova
- Military history of Monaco
- Military history of Mongolia
- Military history of Morocco
- Military history of Mozambique
- Military history of Myanmar

Back to top

== N ==
- Military history of Nagorno-Karabakh
- Military history of Namibia
- Military history of Nauru
- Military history of Nepal
- Military history of the Netherlands
- Military history of New Zealand
- Military history of Nicaragua
- Military history of Niger
- Military history of Nigeria
- Military history of Northern Cyprus
- Military history of North Korea
- Military history of Norway

Back to top

== O ==
- Military history of Oman

Back to top

== P ==
- Military history of Pakistan
- Military history of Palau
- Military history of Panama
- Military history of Papua New Guinea
- Military history of Paraguay
- Military history of Peru
- Military history of the Philippines
- Military history of Poland
- Military history of Portugal
- Military history of Puerto Rico

Back to top

== Q ==
- Military history of Qatar

Back to top

== R ==
- Military history of the Roman Empire
- Military history of Romania
- Military history of Russia
- Military history of Rwanda

Back to top

== S ==
- Military history of Saint Kitts and Nevis
- Military history of Saint Lucia
- Military history of Saint Vincent and the Grenadines
- Military history of Samoa
- Military history of San Marino
- Military history of São Tomé and Príncipe
- Military history of Saudi Arabia
- Military history of Scotland
- Military history of Senegal
- Military history of Serbia
- Military history of Seychelles
- Military history of Sierra Leone
- Military history of Singapore
- Military history of Slovakia
- Military history of Slovenia
- Military history of the Solomon Islands
- Military history of Somalia
- Military history of Somaliland
- Military history of South Africa
- Military history of South Ossetia
- Military history of South Korea
- Military history of the Soviet Union
- Military history of Spain
- Military history of Sri Lanka
- Military history of Sudan
- Military history of Suriname
- Military history of Sweden
- Military history of Switzerland
- Military history of Syria

Back to top

== T ==
- Military history of the Republic of China (Taiwan)
- Military history of Tajikistan
- Military history of Tanzania
- Military history of Thailand
- Military history of Togo
- Military history of Tonga
- Military history of Transnistria
- Military history of Trinidad and Tobago
- Military history of Tunisia
- Military history of Turkey
- Military history of Turkmenistan
- Military history of Tuvalu

Back to top

== U ==
- Military history of Uganda
- Military history of Ukraine
- Military history of the United Arab Emirates
- Military history of the United Kingdom
  - Military history of the United Kingdom of Great Britain and Ireland
  - Military history of the United Kingdom
  - Military history of the Republic of Ireland
  - Military history of Northern Ireland
- Military history of the United States
  - Military history of the Confederate States
- Military history of Uruguay
- Military history of Uzbekistan

Back to top

== V ==
- Military history of Vanuatu
- Military history of the Vatican City
  - Since 1929, defense has been responsibility of Italy (see military history of Italy); for pre-1929 military history, see military history of the Papal States.
- Military history of Venezuela
- Military history of Vietnam

Back to top

== W ==
- Military history of Western Sahara
- Military history of Wales

Back to top

== Y ==
- Military history of Yemen

Back to top

== Z ==
- Military history of Zambia
- Military history of Zimbabwe

Back to top
