= Ethnic minorities in the United States Armed Forces during World War II =

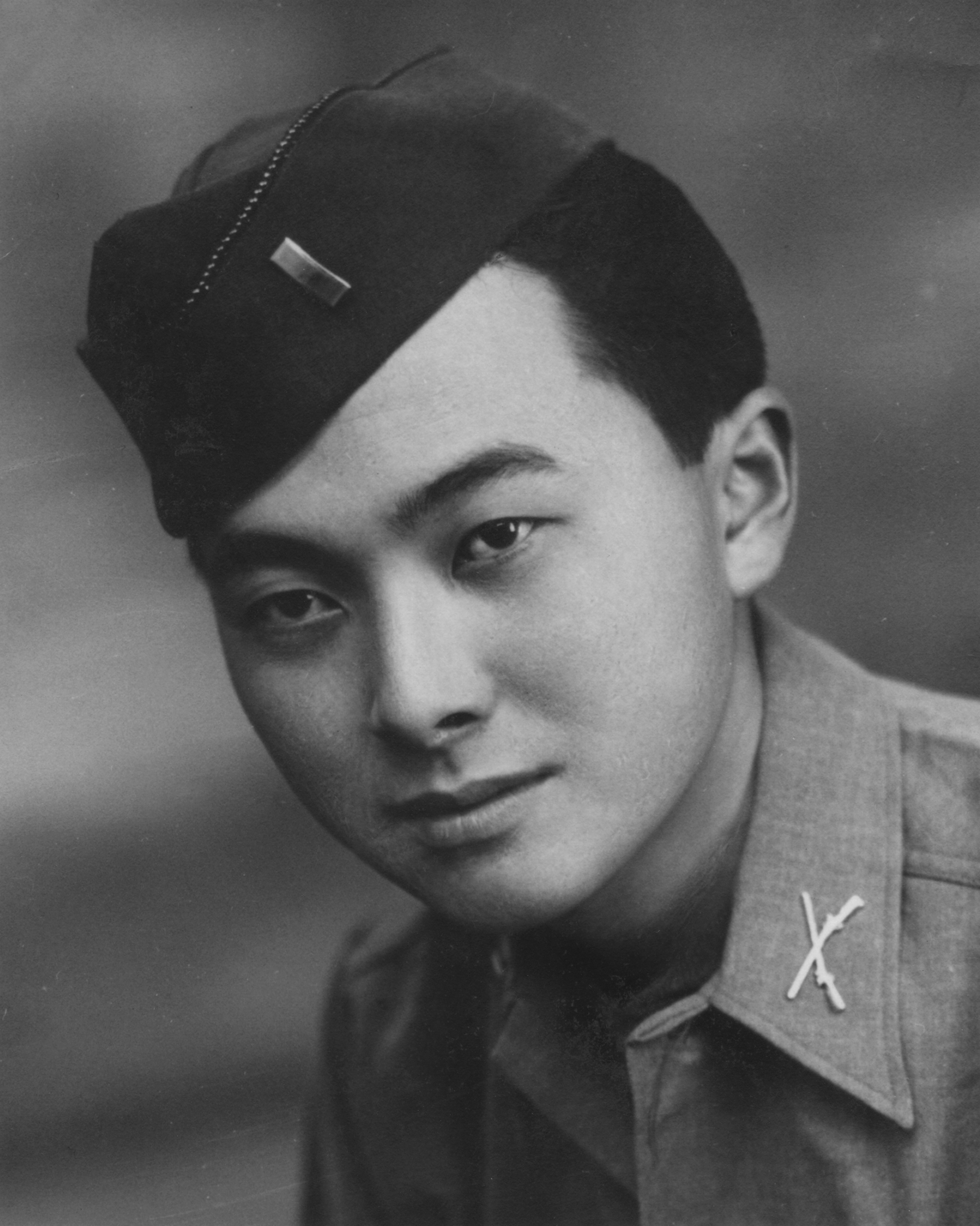
Lt. Daniel Inouye was a Japanese-American who served during World War II.

Ethnic minorities in the U.S. Armed Forces during World War II comprised about 13% of all military service members. All biologically male adults aged 18-64 in the US were subject to the draft for most of the war, though Japanese citizens were prohibited from being drafted until 1944; all service members were subject to the same rate of pay. The 16 million men and women in the services included 1 million African Americans, along with 33,000+ Japanese-Americans, 20,000+ Chinese Americans, 24,674 American Indians, and some 16,000 Filipino-Americans. According to House concurrent resolution 253, 400,000 to 500,000 Hispanic Americans served. They were released from military service in 1945–46 on equal terms, and were eligible for the G.I. Bill and other veterans' benefits on a basis of equality. Many veterans, having learned organizational skills, and become more alert to the nationwide situation of their group, became active in civil rights activities after the war.

== White minority participation ==
The majority of the American population at the outbreak of the war were of European descent, including Italy, Germany, and Ireland. A considerable number of groups legally defined as white could still be considered ethnic minorities at the time, particularly those from Southern or Eastern Europe. Detailed tabulations were not kept for these groups by the U.S. military, which simply listed them all as "white". Separate statistics were kept for African Americans and Asian Americans.

=== Latino-Americans ===
Hispanic Americans, also referred to as Latinos, served in all elements of the American armed forces in the war. They fought in every major American battle in the war. According to House concurrent resolution 253, 400,000 to 500,000 Hispanic Americans served in the U.S. Armed Forces during World War II, out of a total of 16,000,000. Most were of Mexican or Puerto Rican descent. By another estimate, over 500,000 Mexican-Americans served plus over 65,000 Puerto Ricans and smaller numbers of others. Hispanic-Americans constituted 3.1% to 3.2% of the total who served. A number of Hispanics served in senior leadership positions, the highest ranking being Marine Corps Lieutenant-General Pedro Del Valle.

The exact number of Hispanics serving in the US military is unknown as, at the time, Hispanics were not tabulated separately, but were generally included in the general white population census count. President Roosevelt had personally demanded all Mexican-Americans be classified as white as part of his "Good Neighbor" policy with US-friendly Latin American nations while most Puerto Ricans had always been considered legally white since the island was annexed on part of its population being of majority-European descent (the average Puerto Rican being 66% European, 18% Native American, and 16% West African). While the military did not document the numbers of Hispanic servicemen and servicewomen, the US Census did note that less than 2% of the general population was of Hispanic origin; if true this would mean Hispanic-Americans were overrepresented in the armed forces.

=== Jewish-Americans ===
Over 550,000 Jewish-Americans served in the armed forces during World War II, account for 3.5% of the roughly 16 million American soldiers in total, the highest number of Jewish soldiers of any participating country. There were 4,770,000 American Jews at the time, accounting for 3.6% of the US population, meaning they were proportionally represented. 22 Jewish-Americans obtained the ranks of general or admiral during the war, including Major General Maurice Rose, and 49,315 earned citations for valor in combat. The total number of Jewish-American war casualties was 38,338, with 11,000 killed.

=== Polish-Americans ===
Americans of Polish descent were common in all the military ranks and divisions, and were among the first to volunteer for the war effort. They were heavily motivated by the Nazi policy of extermination towards the people of occupied Poland, the first country attacked during the war. Polish Americans were enthusiastic enlistees. They composed 4% of the American population at the time, but ultimately composed 8% of the U.S. military during World War II, with over 1,000,000 joining the U.S. armed forces. Polish general Władysław Sikorski toured the United States in a failed attempt to raise large numbers of Polish-Americans for segregated battalions, saying that they were "turning their backs" on Poland by not joining the cause.

=== Italian-Americans ===
Over 1.5 million Italian-American soldiers served in World War II, accounting for 10% of the armed forces, of whom 14 won Medals of Honor. While Italian-Americans were in general enthusiastic participants in the Allied cause, several Italian-language newspapers were forced to close because of past support of the fascist government of Benito Mussolini.

=== Arab-Americans ===
Over 30,000 Arab-Americans are estimated to have served during the war, accounting for 0.2% of soldiers. Most were of Lebanese descent.

=== Armenian-Americans ===
During World War II, about 18,500 Armenians served in the armed forces of the United States. A number of them were decorated for their service, including Col. Ernest Dervishian, a native of Virginia, who was awarded the Medal of Honor. US Marine Harry Kizirian is considered the most decorated soldier of the state of Rhode Island. Another Marine Captain, Victor Maghakian is considered one of the most decorated American soldiers of the war. The highest-ranking Armenian-American during World War II was Brigadier General Haig Shekerjian (who had previously served in the Pancho Villa Expedition and as an American military attache in the Middle Eastern theater of World War I). He was appointed Commanding General of Camp Sibert, Alabama, which was used extensively as the main training camp for chemical warfare troops, and remained in that position until 1945. Shekerjian also gave numerous speeches during the war encouraging Americans of Armenian descent to enlist.

== Possible reasons for ethnic minority participation ==
The participation of ethnic minorities in the US armed forces during World War II highlighted an inconsistency in American ideology at the time. The United States invaded German-occupied Europe to fight against Nazi Germany and their ideas of a master race, while at the same time perpetuating extreme levels of racism and discrimination at home to all minorities, most prominently African Americans. These soldiers and sailors were aware of this perceived double standard, and thus began the Double V campaign for a "Double Victory": a victory against National Socialism and Fascism abroad, and a victory against racism at home. The black soldiers fought for equal citizenship and better job opportunities. W.E.B. Du Bois declared that in order to win World War II, we must also win the “War for Racial Equality” at home.

As the enlistment statistics below demonstrate, some men were drafted, others enlisted voluntarily. Ethnic minorities gave many patriotic reasons for wanting to participate in the War effort. For many, it was an exciting role and essential to identify with one's pride and courage. For some, fighting in the war was a way to prove their patriotism and honor their love for their country. Those who fight for this reason considered themselves Americans, independently of race, and thus felt obligated or proud to fight for their country. Others took a strategic approach, serving in the U.S. armed forces with the belief that once they returned as veterans the U.S. would have to do away with racial discrimination and segregation. Others still recognized the opportunity to achieve financial security for their families; jobs in the armed forces could provide them with steady incomes when they were often excluded from jobs in the defense industries and trade unions at home. Women were not drafted, but they enlisted with the same motivations as the men. Japanese Americans who were US citizens volunteered in large numbers, especially in Hawaii. The Cuban-American community, based in Florida, saw military services and opportunity for adventure, patriotism and financial aid to their family.

== Detailed instances of racial discrimination ==
Whatever their reasons for joining, they all faced further discrimination in the U.S. armed forces. At the start of the War, all branches of the U.S. military were segregated. President Harry S. Truman ordered the end of military segregation with his Executive Order 9981 in 1948, but racial discrimination and segregation continued in the U.S. armed forces through the Korean War. Some states did not desegregate their National Guard until the mid-sixties.

African American soldiers and sailors were banned from fighting on the front lines, and were assigned menial tasks in place of positions in combat. However, in some cases of emergency or shortage, African Americans were brought to the front lines, including during the Invasion of Normandy and the Battle of the Bulge. Mess-attendant Dorie Miller left his station to fire at the attacking planes during the Attack on Pearl Harbor. Some special African American units, such as the Tuskegee Airmen, also fought in combat.

Many African-Americans wrote or otherwise described the great disparities in treatment between themselves and white soldiers. Some of these disparities included receiving fewer provisions and poorer quality gear, and struggling with gross disorganization in command and instruction. In letters to his girlfriend back home, one African American soldier named Jim Dansby described, “the colored here in camp seem to be neglected to a certain extent. We are poorly organized,” and “I am pretty much disgusted. I don’t think they’re treating us right.” Additionally, there were often racial tensions between different ethnic minority groups within the armed forces. Beyond these, African Americans and other ethnic minority servicemen had to undergo their training in communities run by Jim Crow laws, enforced by local police. Dansby also described events of racial violence in the town where he trained at Camp Shelby, Mississippi, and the effect such events had upon his psyche: “Honey I am telling you I’ll be glad when I get away from this place. A soldier got killed in town last nite, also the nite before. The one that was killed the nite before was found by the railroad tracks with his head cut and arm almost cut off. These soldiers down here are really bad…so anything liable to happen.”

== Statistical information ==
The following passage from pages 187-190 of Selective Service and Victory: The 4th Report of the Director of Selective Service (Washington: Government Printing Office, 1948) represents the best statistical information available to the United States Army Center of Military History to answer questions about the participation of various minority groups. Note which of these statistics only cover those minorities drafted into the armed forces and which include personnel who voluntarily enlisted. Statistics are difficult to compile since contemporary classifications and the Army's interest in data rarely match modern interests.

=== Minority groups ===
Another special problem of great importance in Selective Service operations was the mobilization of black ("Negro") registrants and other minority groups of this nature. The main difficulty here was securing the induction of men who were found (1) to be available by the System and (2) to be qualified by the armed forces physical examination. There were, of course, other problems as evidenced by the following treatment of the matter for the period extending from July 1, 1944, through December 31, 1945.

==== One million African-American inductions ====
Black people were an important source of manpower for the armed forces in World War II as is shown by the fact that a total of 1,056,841 African American registrants were inducted into the armed forces through Selective Service as of December 31, 1945. Of these,

1. 885,945 went into the Army,
2. 153,224 into the Navy,
3. 16,005 into the Marine Corps, and
4. 1,667 into the Coast Guard.

The African American inductees made up:

1. 10.9 percent of all registrants inducted into the Army (8,108,531),
2. 10.0 percent of all inductions into the Navy (1,526,250),
3. 8.5 percent of all Marine Corps inductions (188,709) and
4. 10.9 percent of all Coast Guard inductions (15,235).

Thus African Americans, who constituted approximately 11.0 percent of all registrants liable for service, furnished approximately this proportion of the inductees in all branches of the service except During the period July 1, 1944 – December 31, 1945, 141,294 African Americans were inducted, comprising 9.6 percent of all inductions (1,469,808) therein. Of this number:

1. 103,360 went into the Army, which was 9.1 percent of all Army inductions (1,132,962).
2. The Navy received 36,616 Negroes, or 11.6 percent of its inductees (316,215).
3. The 1,309 Negroes going into the Marine Corps were 6.4 percent of Marine Corps inductions (20,563).
4. Only 9 African Americans were inducted into the Coast Guard, but this was 13.2 percent of the inductees for this branch of service (68).

The somewhat lower proportion of African American inductions during this period was principally due to the proportionately lower calls made upon Selective Service for African American registrants. The African American call for 18 months was only 135,600, or 8.3 percent of the total call (1,639,100).

==== Inductions of other minority groups ====
Inductions into the Army of Selective Service registrants from other racial and nationality groups up to December 31, 1945, included:

1. 13,311 Chinese,
2. 20,080 Japanese,
3. 1,320 Hawaiians,
4. 44,000 American Indians,
5. 11,506 Filipinos,
6. 51,438 Puerto Ricans.

The 13,311 Chinese Americans Who were drafted comprised about 22% of all adult Chinese men. An additional several thousand volunteered for service. One in four served in the Air Force.

Counting enlistments and those in the Enlisted Reserve Corps, a total of 24,085 Japanese Americans had either enlisted or been inducted into the Army by December 31, 1945. Similar statistics are not available for the naval services. Also by June 30, 1945, a total of 125,880 aliens of various nationalities had enlisted or been inducted into the Army and Navy. The increased proportion of inductions of Japanese-Americans during the two 6-months periods from July 1, 1944, to June 30, 1945, is indicated in the first table. Beginning January 14, 1944, registrants who were natural-born United States citizens of Japanese extraction or parentage were subject to induction in the Army after the War Department had determined in each case that the registrant was acceptable.

==== African American enlistments ====
From December 1942 until VJ-day there were relatively few enlistments into the armed forces as restrictions against the direct recruiting of men in the age group acceptable for service (18–37) were in effect. The reasons why relatively few African Americans enlisted during World War II were numerous. The principal one, however, was the severe restrictions placed against African American enlistments by the armed forces, which, in some periods, amounted to complete prohibition.

Army inductions by race, July 1, 1944 – December 31, 1945 United States and Territories
Race	To June 30, 1944	July–December 1944	January–June 1945	July–December 1945	To December 31, 1945
All Races	7,041,087 (100%)	393,392 (100%)	518,127 (100%)	272,747 (100%)	8,225,353 (100%)
White	6,139,589 (87.2%)	348,060 (88.5%)	457,460 (88.3%)	236,675 (86.7%)	7,181,784 (87.3%)
African American	797,444 (11.3%)	30,882 (7.8%)	46,123 (8.9%)	27,447 (10.1%)	901,896 (11.0%)
Japanese	11,260 (0.2%)	3,483 (0.9%)	2,933 (0.6%)	2,404 (0.9%)	20,080 (0.1%)
Puerto Rican	2,344 (0.5%)	8,109 (2.1%)	8,005 (1.5%)	2,980 (1.1%)	51,438 (0.6%)
Others	60,450 (0.8%)	2,858 (0.7%)	3,606 (0.7%)	3,241 (1.2%)	70,155 (0.9%)

== See also ==
- Military history of the United States during World War II
