= Geben (disambiguation) =

Geben may refer to

- Geben, Silver sulfadiazine an antibacterial
- Geben, a town in Andırın district of Kahramanmaraş Province, Turkey
