= Andırın =

- District and municipality
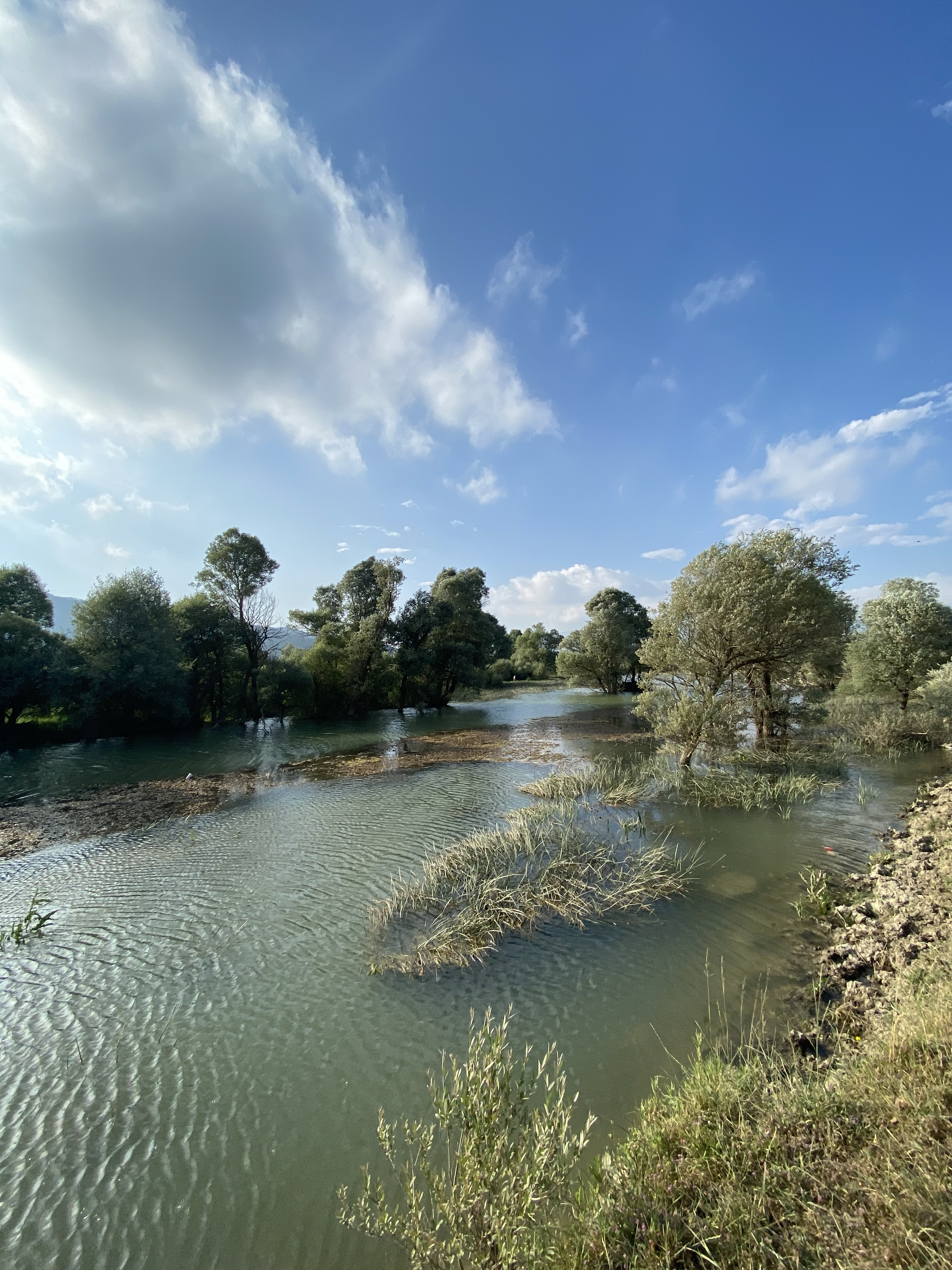
- Körçoban forest in Kargacayırı village

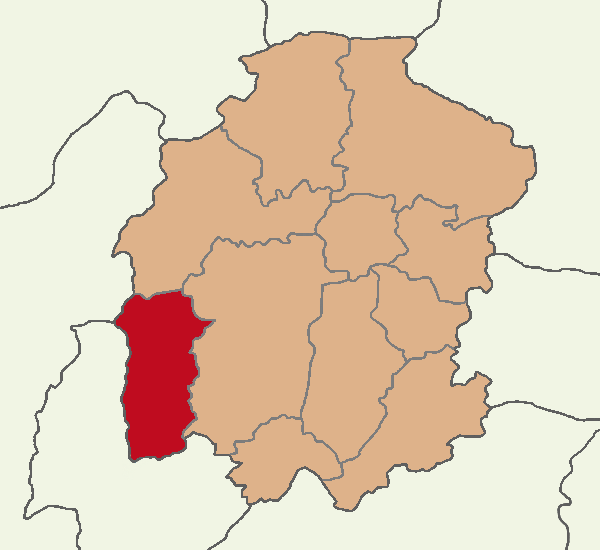
- Map showing Andırın District in Kahramanmaraş Province

- Location within Turkey
- Coordinates: 37°34′35″N 36°21′02″E
- Country: Turkey
- Province: Kahramanmaraş

Government
  - Mayor: Ahmet Sinan Gökşen (AKP)
- Area: 1,202 km^{2} (464 sq mi)
- Elevation: 1,050 m (3,440 ft)
- Population (2022): 31,224
  - Density: 25.98/km^{2} (67.28/sq mi)
- Time zone: UTC+3 (TRT)
- Postal code: 46400
- Area code: 0344
- Website: www.andirin.bel.tr

Andırın is a municipality and district of Kahramanmaraş Province, Turkey. Its area is 1,202 km^{2}, and its population is 31,224 (2022).

== Composition ==
There are 57 neighbourhoods in Andırın District:

- Akçakoyunlu
- Akgümüş
- Akifiye
- Alameşe
- Alanlı
- Alınoluk
- Altınboğa
- Altınyayla
- Anacık
- Arıklar
- Başdoğan
- Bektaşlı
- Beşbucak
- Boğazören
- Bostanlı
- Boynuyoğunlu
- Boztopraklı
- Bulgurkaya
- Cambaz
- Camuzluk
- Çiçekli
- Çiğşar
- Çokak
- Çuhadarlı
- Darıovası
- Efirağızlı
- Emirler
- Erenler
- Geben
- Gökahmetli
- Gökçeli
- Gökgedik
- Hacıveliuşağı
- Kabaağaç
- Kabaklar
- Kaleboynu
- Karapınar
- Kargaçayırı
- Kıyıkçı
- Kızık
- Köklü
- Köleli
- Kumarlı
- Kuzgun
- Orhaniye
- Osmancık
- Pınarbaşı
- Rifatiye
- Sumaklı
- Tatarlı
- Torun
- Tufanpaşa
- Yeni
- Yeniköy
- Yeşilova
- Yeşiltepe
- Yeşilyurt
