= Military history of Ireland =

The military history of Ireland comprises thousands of years of armed actions in the territory encompassing the island of Ireland.

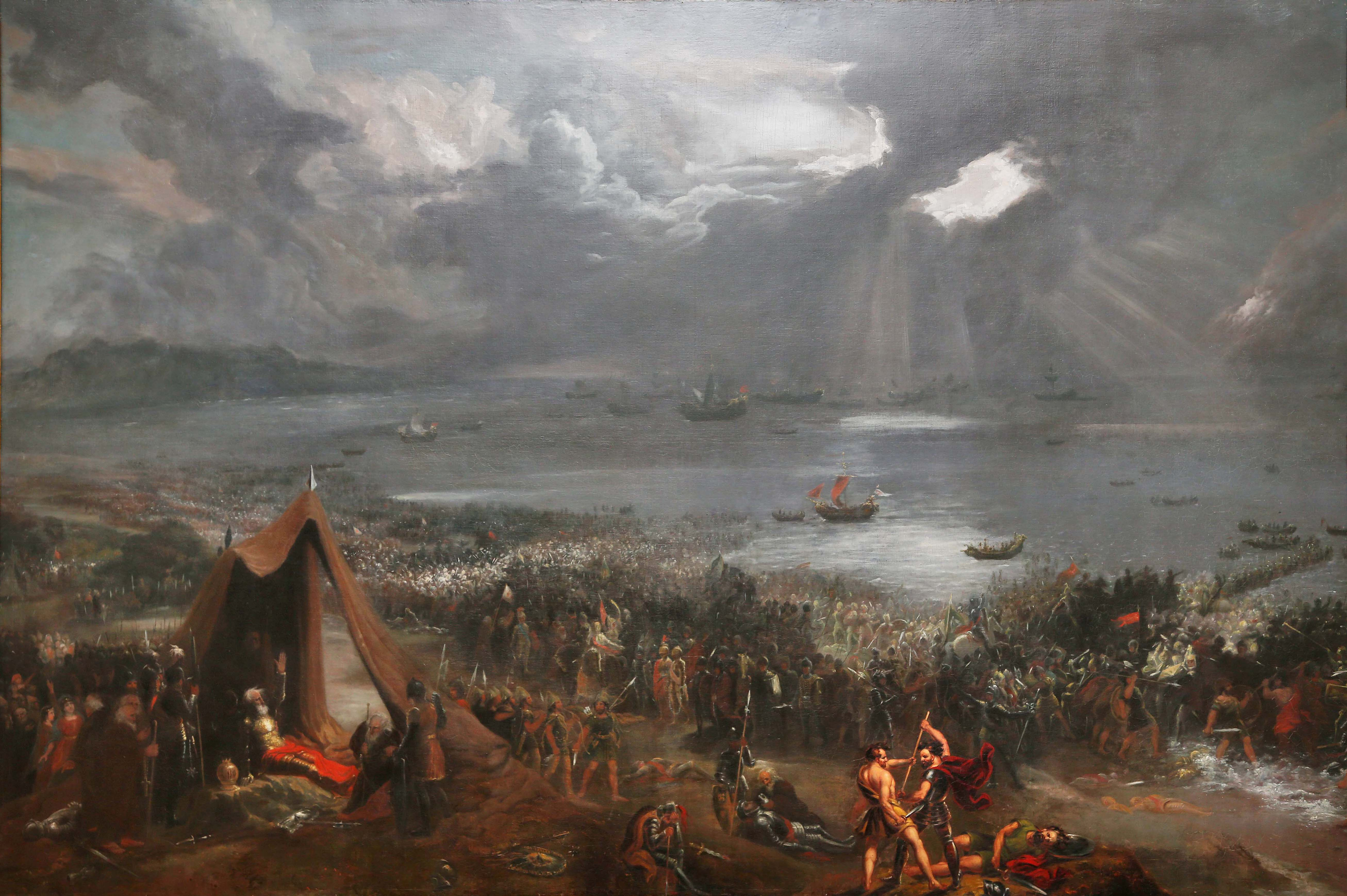
The Battle of Clontarf in 1014 saw a large force of Vikings and their Irish allies defeated by the forces of the High King of Ireland.

Ireland was never invaded by the Roman Empire, and the island remained a warring collection of separate kingdoms throughout its early history. Although it is known that the Romans traded with the Irish kingdoms, historically it was thought that the Romans never established a military presence in Ireland. In recent times the find of ruins of a possibly Roman fort in Drumanagh near Dublin has questioned this belief.

After the November 2015 Paris attacks killed more than 130 people in France, the French government invoked a mutual defence clause of the Treaty of Lisbon, asking for military assistance from the European Union. The Irish government agreed to deploy peacekeeping troops to Mali in order to free up French troops stationed there for deployment elsewhere.

== Royal Air Force stations in Northern Ireland ==
Name	Opened	Closed	Current use	Notes
RAF Aldergrove	February 1918		Joint Helicopter Command Flying Station Aldergrove	
RAF Ballyhalbert	June 1941	February 1946	Ballyhalbert Caravan Park	
RAF Ballykelly	June 1941	June 1971		
RAF Bishops Court	April 1943	December 1990	Bishopscourt Racing Circuit	
RAF Boa Island	May 1944	May 1945	Slipway	
RAF Castle Archdale	February 1941	January 1958	Castle Archdale Caravan Park & Camping Site	
RAF Cluntoe	October 1942	1959	Ardboe Business Park	
RAF Eglinton	April 1941		City of Derry Airport	
RAF Greencastle	July 1942	1947	Farmland	
RAF Killadeas	March 1941	May 1947	Marina	
RAF Kirkistown	July 1941	1946	Kirkistown Circuit	
RAF Langford Lodge; No. 20 SLG	May 1941	1953	Industry	
RAF Limavady	December 1940	1958	Aghanloo Industrial Estate	
RAF Long Kesh	November 1941	October 1947	Balmoral Park	
RAF Maghaberry; No. 101 Storage Sub Site	November 1941	1950s	Maghaberry Solar Farm	
RAF Maydown	April 1941	1947	Maydown Industrial Estate	
RAF Mullaghmore	August 1942	1946	Aghadowey Stadium	
RAF Murlough; No. 19 SLG	March 1941	February 1945	Farmland	
RAF Newtownards	August 1934		Newtownards Airport	
RAF Nutts Corner	June 1941	September 1963	Nutt's Corner Circuit	
RAF Omagh	1918	1930s	Farmland	
RAF Sandy Bay	1930s	1940s	Marina	
RAF St Angelo; No. 18 SLG; No. 106 Storage Sub Site	April 1941		Enniskillen/St Angelo Airport	
RAF Sydenham	1933		George Best Belfast City Airport	
RAF Toome	January 1943	1969	Creagh Industrial Park	

== Former Royal Air Force airfields in the Republic ==
Name	Opened	Closed	Current use	Notes
Gormanston	August 1918	April 1920		
Tallaght	August 1918	April 1920		
Baldonnel	May 1918	February 1922		
The Curragh	December 1917	February 1920		
Fermoy	May 1918	February 1922		
Limerick				Detachment of No. 2 Squadron during 1913
Rathbone Camp (Birr)	September 1913	September 1913		
Oranmore	May 1918	February 1922		
Castlebar	May 1918	May 1921		

== See also ==
- History of Ireland
- List of conflicts in Ireland
- Irish Defence Forces
- Irish regiments of the British Army
- List of Irish uprisings
- Irish military diaspora
