= Military history of the Republic of Artsakh =

The military history of the Republic of Artsakh contains information about the history of military actions or events performed by or in the Republic of Artsakh.

== Artsakh Defense Army ==
The Artsakh Defense Army (sometimes also known as Artsakh Self-Defense Army) was officially established on May 9, 1992 as the formal defense force of the unrecognized Republic of Artsakh, uniting previously disorganized self-defense units which were formed in the early 1990s in order to protect the ethnic Armenian population of Artsakh from the attacks by the military of the Soviet and Azerbaijani forces. Currently Artsakh Defence Army is around 15,000–20,000 well-trained and equipped officers and soldiers. It consists of infantry, tanks, artillery and anti-aircraft systems.

== Capture of Shusha ==
The Capture of Shushi marked the first significant military victory by Armenian forces in the Nagorno-Karabakh enclave during the First Nagorno-Karabakh War. The battle was part of a larger territorial land dispute with the predominantly Armenian population in Karabakh who, aided by the neighboring Armenia, regained independence from the Republic of Azerbaijan. The battle took place in the strategically vital mountain town of Shusha (known as Shushi to Armenians) on the evening of May 8, 1992 and fighting swiftly concluded the following day after Armenian forces captured and drove out the defending Azeris. Armenian military commanders based in Nagorno-Karabakh's capital of Stepanakert had been contemplating the seizure of the town after a hail of Azeri military bombardment had begun shelling the city.

== Battle of Kelbajar ==
The Battle of Kelbajar was the capture of the western region of Kelbajar, Azerbaijan during the 1993 spring-summer campaign by Armenian military forces in the First Nagorno-Karabakh War. Kelbajar was outside the boundaries of the contested enclave of Nagorno-Karabakh that Armenian and Azeri forces had been fighting over for five years. Bordering Armenia proper, the predominantly Armenian populated region of Nagorno-Karabakh had announced their declaration of independence from Azerbaijan in 1991 and fighting had taken place mostly in the enclave itself. Seeking to keep the territory under its rule, the Armenians of Karabakh were aided by Armenia itself in the form of logistics, supplies, volunteers and military weaponry. Kelbajar, only several kilometers from Armenia's border, comprised several dozen villages including its eponymous provincial capital.

== First Nagorno-Karabakh War ==
The First Nagorno-Karabakh War refers to the armed conflict that took place from February 1988 to May 1994, in the small ethnic enclave of Nagorno-Karabakh in southwestern Azerbaijan, between the ethnic Armenians of Nagorno Karabakh backed by Armenia and Azerbaijani Republic. As the war progressed, Armenia and Azerbaijan, both former Soviet Republics, became enveloped in a protracted, undeclared war as the latter attempted to curb a secessionist movement in Nagorno-Karabakh. The enclave's parliament had voted in favor of uniting itself with Armenia and a referendum was held with the vast majority of the Karabakh population voting in favor of independence. The demand to unify with Armenia, which proliferated in the late 1980s, began in a relatively peaceful manner; however, in the following months, as the Soviet Union's disintegration neared, it gradually grew into an increasingly violent conflict between the two ethnic groups.

== Second Nagorno-Karabakh War ==
The Artsakh Defence Army suffered a defeat in the Second Nagorno-Karabakh War, fighting against the military of Azerbaijan.

== See also ==
- Military history of Armenia
