= Harry Kizirian =

United States Marine (1925–2002)

USMC Harry Kizirian
- Born: July 13, 1925; Providence, Rhode Island, United States
- Died: September 13, 2002 (aged 77); Providence, Rhode Island, United States
- Burial place: Swan Point Cemetery
- Spouse: Hazel Serabian
- Military career
- Allegiance: United States
- Branch: United States Marine Corps
- Service years: February 23, 1944 – February 11, 1946
- Rank: Corporal
- Nickname: Killer or Beast
- Service number: 942989
- Conflicts: World War II: Battle of Okinawa
- Awards: Navy Cross; Bronze Star, Combat "V"; Purple Heart Medal (2); Rhode Island Cross
- Other work: Postmaster

Harry Kizirian (Armenian: Հէրի Գիզիրեան; July 13, 1925 – September 13, 2002) was an Armenian American member of the United States Marine Corps who served during World War II. Kizirian's service lasted from February 1944 to February 1946, during which he spent seventeen months overseas. Kizirian took part in the Battle of Okinawa, where he landed during the first assault wave while heading a Marine fire team.

Having been awarded the Navy Cross, the Rhode Island Cross, the Bronze Star with Combat "V", and the Purple Heart twice, Kizirian is considered one of the most decorated marines of World War II. He is also the most decorated serviceman from Rhode Island. In 1961 he was appointed by John F. Kennedy as the postmaster of Providence, becoming (at age 36) one of the youngest postmasters in the United States. During his postmastership, Kizirian was instrumental in establishing the first automated post office in the country, which made the Providence post office an operational model for the United States and worldwide.

Kizirian is widely known in the state of Rhode Island, where a post office, a plaza, and an elementary school are named in his honor. The Harry Kizirian Post Office became the first U.S. federal building named after an Armenian American. Inducted in the Rhode Island Hall of Fame in 1978, Kizirian is regarded as a "national treasure" and has been honored by numerous organizations.

== Life ==
Kizirian, a first generation Armenian American, was born in his home on July 13, 1925, at 134 Chad Brown St. Providence, Rhode Island. He was the only son of Toros and Hripsime Kizirian, who were born in Goydun (Govdun), near Sivas, in the Ottoman Empire. Kizirian's mother came to the United States in the 1920s after losing her first husband and seven children during the Armenian genocide. His father was employed by the Rhode Island Tool Company and his mother was a housewife.

Kizirian, who was active in sports, was offered a scholarship to LaSalle Academy. He declined the offer so that he could attend the local Mt. Pleasant High School and be closer to his friends. Kizirian became a top athlete in his class; he played on the football team for three years and became captain in his senior year.

When Kizirian was 15 years old, his father died. Harry became responsible for the care of himself and his mother. To take care of the family's immediate needs, Kizirian worked at a meat packing plant unloading sides of beef from freight cars. He then got a temporary position at the Providence post office for two years while finishing high school.

On February 23, 1944—the day after his graduation from high school—Kizirian enlisted in the United States Marine Corps. He was sent overseas on October 6, 1944, and was assigned to the 6th Marine Division

After spending seventeen months overseas, Kizirian returned to Providence, where he married Hazel Serabian of Massena, New York. For the first four years after his return, Kizirian underwent treatment for wounds he suffered during battle. In spite of undergoing several major surgeries, Kizirian was left with permanent disabilities.

After recovering from a life-threatening illness in which surgeons removed 95 percent of his stomach, Kizirian entered a career in the Postal Service. He first returned to the Providence post office as a substitute clerk. In 1954, he was appointed foreman, the first of several promotions he received throughout his life. In 1961, he was made Postmaster of Providence by President John F. Kennedy. Congress unanimously confirmed the appointment. At age 36, Kizirian was one of the youngest postmasters in the country. During his tenure, Kizirian was instrumental in establishing the first automated post office. The Providence post office would be an exemplary model for post offices around the world. Kizirian later remarked, "There is no nation on this earth that didn't send representatives to see the new post office."

In 1986, Kizirian was removed from his position amid opposition from Senators John Chafee and Claiborne Pell. Despite protests from the employees who wore pins that said "We Love Harry", Kizirian's position was eliminated and he subsequently retired.

Kiziran and his wife had five children: Joanne, Thomas, Janice, Shakay, and Richard.

Kizirian died on September 13, 2002, at age 77. His funeral procession was held at the Saint Vartanants Armenian Apostolic Church in Providence and he is buried at the Swan Point Cemetery.

== World War II ==
=== Battle of Okinawa ===
Kizirian joined the Marine Corps on February 23, 1944. He was sent overseas after training and assigned to Company E, 2nd Battalion, 22nd Marines, 6th Marine Division on Guadalcanal in the Solomon Islands. Serving as a fire team leader, he participated in the invasion of Okinawa on April 1, 1945, landing with the first assault wave. On May 11, he charged an enemy machine gun position that had pinned down members of another unit of his platoon and forced the enemy to withdrawal so the other Marine unit could continue its advance on the enemy. Wounded during his attack on the enemy, he and his fire team joined up with the other Marine unit in its advance on the Japanese. Company E moved east the same day toward Shuri Ridge. On May 14, Company E attacked and seized the Japanese air strip, then stopped for a short rest. Kizirian's injuries on May 11 included shell fragments in his shoulders and arms. Despite his wounds he continued fighting. He was awarded the Bronze Star Medal with Combat "V" and the Purple Heart Medal for his actions on May 11. His Bronze Star citation reads:

For heroic achievement in connection with operations against the Japanese enemy on Okinawa Shima, Ryukyu Islands, on May 11, 1945. While serving as a fire team leader in a Marine rifle company, Corporal Kizirian, seeing a unit of his advancing platoon pinned down by enemy machine gun fire, courageously charged the enemy emplacement, thus enabling the trapped unit to continue to advance. Although painfully wounded, he fearlessly closed in on the emplacement, firing rapidly into the embrasure and succeeded in driving the enemy from their weapon. Meanwhile, men of the trapped unit continued to move out in the assault, and Corporal Kizirian, still leading his fire team, joined them. By this prompt and heroic action, Corporal Kizirian assisted materially in the continued advance of his platoon. His actions were at all time in keeping with the highest traditions of the United States Naval Service.

— Lemuel C. Shepherd, Jr., Major General, U.S. Marine Corps

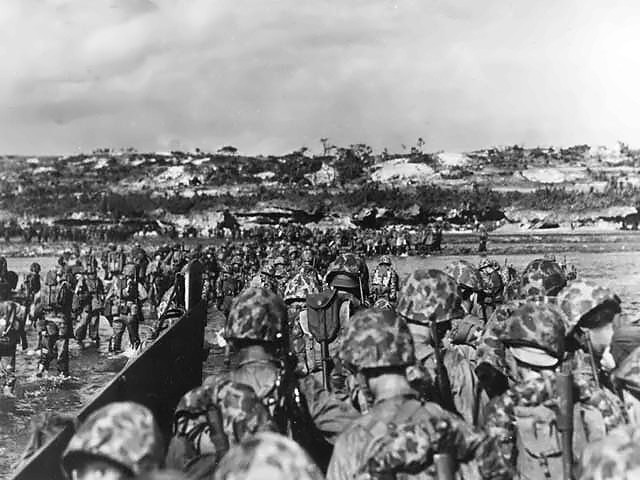
Kizirian was among the U.S. Marine reinforcements that waded ashore to support the beachhead in Okinawa on 1 April 1945.

After a month to recover from his wounds, Kizirian rejoined his unit, which was assigned to Sugar Loaf Hill. The Marines battled over one ridge after another toward NaHa, the capital city. On three separate occasions Kizirian was tossed in the air by Japanese artillery and mortar fire while he provided covering fire for other members of his unit, who were retreating down a slope. Kizirian's company moved to a burial ground where Japanese soldiers were hiding in holes dug in the nearby hillsides. During the operation, someone yelled, "Two over your head!" Kizirian responded by killing both of the enemy combatants with his carbine. Kizirian would later recall, "I must have shot four clips into those guys, I got them before they got me." Moments later, an enemy rushed towards Kizirian with a sword. Kizirian managed to kill the enemy with a pistol and took the sword.

The battalion commander was killed, and soon afterwards, orders arrived to seek and destroy any enemy combatants around NaHa. On June 11, 1945, Kizirian was assigned the special task of patrolling to locate elements of an enemy reserve platoon. His unit moved to attack Japanese soldiers entrenched along a ridge line. Through the smoke and dust, he noticed six stretcher bearers and a wounded Marine that were under heavy machine gun fire. Disregarding his own safety, Kizirian placed himself in the line of fire and single-handedly attacked the enemy emplacement. The Japanese Special Naval Landing Forces that confronted Kizirian shot him in the legs and abdomen. Unable to walk, he still managed to make his way forward using his elbows to a position where he was able to shoot and kill all 12 soldiers manning the machine gun. Due to these actions, Kizirian was awarded the Navy Cross, the second highest medal in the United States military. The citation provides details about the event:

The Navy Cross is presented to Harry Kizirian, Corporal, U.S. Marine Corps (Reserve), for extraordinary heroism while serving as an Automatic Rifleman of Company E, Second Battalion, Twenty-second Marines, Sixth Marine Division, in action against enemy Japanese forces on Okinawa, Ryukyu Islands, on 11 June 1945. Returning from an assigned mission of locating elements of a reserve platoon, Private First Class Kizirian observed a stretcher party of Marines pinned down and suffering casualties while attempting to evacuate the wounded of an adjacent unit. Determined to reach a more advantageous position to deliver accurate fire on the enemy, he unhesitatingly moved forward. Immediately exposed to additional hostile fire which wounded him in both legs and abdomen, he continued to drag himself forward by pressure of his elbows, alternately firing and advancing until he had killed all twelve of the Japanese in the emplacement. By his outstanding courage and aggressive fighting spirit, Private First Class Kizirian enabled the stretcher party to advance and evacuate the wounded. His gallant devotion to duty throughout was in keeping with the highest traditions of the United States Naval Service.

— Roy S. Geiger, Lieutenant General, U.S. Marine Corps

After making a recovery, Kizirian and the Marine units took the capital city of NaHa and were preparing for another assault. Kizirian's unit had fought its way to the crest of a hill and dug in. Kizirian was standing watch at the company command post inside an Okinawa burial ground. When replacements joined the company, many Japanese soldiers harassed the lines by infiltrating the positions of the more inexperienced soldiers. Kizirian ordered that flares should be fired at irregular intervals to would illuminate the scene and distract the enemy. The idea proved successful and the newly arrived Marines soon had the situation under control.

During a break in fighting at Okinawa, Kizirian was photographed by a member of the press. The picture that later appeared on the cover of the June 24, 1945 issue of The New York Times Sunday Magazine. The photograph became the face of the battle for thousands of Americans.

After serving seventeen months overseas, Kizirian received discharge from the Marine Corps on February 11, 1946.

== Military awards ==
Kizirian's military decorations and awards include:

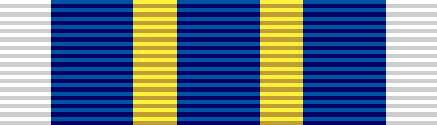

Navy Cross
Bronze Star Medal w/ Combat "V"	Purple Heart w/ 5/16" gold star (two awards)	Presidential Unit Citation
Navy Unit Commendation	China Service Medal	American Campaign Medal
Asiatic-Pacific Campaign Medal w/ bronze 3/16 campaign star	World War II Victory Medal	Rhode Island Cross

In 1947, Kizirian was awarded the Rhode Island Cross by Rhode Island Governor John Pastore for extraordinary heroism in World War II. Kizirian is one of three recipients of this medal which is the highest military award of the state of Rhode Island.

== Other awards and recognition ==
In 1987, the Rhode Island Chapter of the American Society for Public Administration (ASPA) presented him with its John O. Stitely Distinguished Public Service Award. Upon his retirement, a special stamp cancellation showing the flag-raising on Battle of Iwo Jima was issued in his honor.

In October 1994, Kizirian was honored by his own Atwood-Bucci Detachment of the U.S. Marine Corps League. The tribute was attended by Providence Mayor Vincent Cianci, Senator John Pastore, and Rhode Island governor Bruce Sundlun with letters read from Postmaster General Marvin Runyon.

On February 2, 1996, President Bill Clinton signed House Resolution 1606 which renamed the post office located at 24 Corliss Street, Providence, Rhode Island, as the Harry Kizirian Post Office Building. It was the first U.S. federal building named after an Armenian American. The opening ceremony was attended by Mayor Vincent Cianci, House of Representative Jack Reed, Senator John Chafee and Governor of Rhode Island Lincoln Carter Almond. The area outside the post office was named Harry Kizirian Plaza in his honor. Additionally, on May 26, 2001, the Providence City Council passed a resolution that renamed Smith Hill's Camden Avenue School after Kizirian.

Kizirian received the Seven Seals Award from the Rhode Island committee of the Employer Support of the Guard and Reserve in recognition of his three-year term as state chairman. Rhode Island College bestowed its alumni service award on him in 1986, and he received an honorary doctorate in humanities from Roger Williams College in 1983. In May 2002, he received an honorary doctor of public service degree from Rhode Island College. The Ocean State Charities private nonprofit foundation that serves to assist other nonprofit and social service agencies throughout the state of Rhode Island has named an award after Kizirian.

== Community service ==
Kizirian served as a member of the board of directors of Butler Hospital, the Greater Providence Chamber of Commerce, the Providence YMCA, Rhode Island Blue Cross, the Rhode Island Heart Association, and the Rhode Island Lung Association. He was a member of the community advisory board at Rhode Island College, the Providence Heritage Commission, and the Commission on Medal of Honor Recipients from Rhode Island, and was a director of the Smith Hill Center. He served as commander of the American Legion and as detachment commander and state commandant of the Marine Corps League.

He was a member of Disabled American Veterans, Veterans of Foreign Wars, Past Department Commanders, the National Association of Postmasters of the United States, the Federal Executive Council (he was its first chairman), Butler Hospital's capital development committee, and the 1976 Easter Seal Telethon Committee of Meeting Street School. He served on the Rhode Island Bicentennial Commission and was general chairman of its Armenian Heritage subcommittee and a member of the Veterans Affairs subcommittee.

He was chairman of the federal department of the United Fund from 1962 to 1981, and was a former president of Local 105, National Association of Postal Supervisors, and Branch 35, National Association of Postmasters of the United States, and received numerous postal awards. He was chairman of the March of Dimes in 1962 and 1963, the February Heart Month of the Rhode Island Heart Association in 1974, the Pilot Program for the United Way of Southeastern New England 1977–1978, the Rhode Island Employer Support of the Guard and Reserve, 1982–1986, and The Postman's March from 1974 through 1982. Kizirian served as a member of the Blue Cross corporation from 1972 to 1975, and was a trustee of the Ocean State Charities Trust from 1981 to 1986.

Kizirian, who was active in the Armenian community, was a member of the Armenian Revolutionary Federation and the Govdoon Youth of America. He was also a member of the local Saint Vartanants Armenian Apostolic Church.

In retirement, he worked part-time as a consultant to a messenger service in Providence and continued heading dinner committees. He was also active with Big Brothers, the Veterans Home in Bristol, and the Heart Association.

== Quotations ==
When asked what went through his mind when he was blown into the air by enemy bombardment, Kizirian responded:

I wondered if I was ever going to get down again ... I would have made a poor angel, you know ... angels without wings are as uncommon up there as a Marine without guts down here.

His advice to youth was:

Let me say this to young people. War is awful. There's no way to describe it. Nobody wins a war. Don't let any historian tell you differently.

== See also ==
- Armenian Americans
