= Ernest H. Dervishian =

American lawyer

Ernest Herbert Dervishian
- Born: August 10, 1916; Richmond, Virginia, US
- Died: May 20, 1984 (aged 67); Richmond, Virginia, US
- Military career
- Allegiance: United States
- Branch: United States Army
- Service years: 1941 - 1968
- Rank: Colonel
- Units: 135th Infantry Regiment, 34th Infantry Division
- Conflicts: World War II; Italian Campaign; Battle of Anzio
- Awards: Medal of Honor Bronze Star Military Valor Cross (Italy)

Ernest Herbert Dervishian (Armenian: Էռնեստ (Երվանդ) Հերբերտ Դերվիշյան, August 10, 1916 – May 20, 1984) was a United States Army soldier and a recipient of the United States military's highest decoration, the Medal of Honor, for his actions in World War II.

== Biography ==
Dervishian was born in Richmond, Virginia to Hagop Artin Dervishian and Mary Juskalian Dervishian, Armenian immigrants who operated a candy store. In 1937, he passed the Virginia State Bar Examination before he earned his Bachelor of Laws degree from the University of Richmond. He joined the United States Army as a buck private in September 1941, trained at Camp Croft, South Carolina and by May 23, 1944, was serving as a technical sergeant in the 133rd Infantry Regiment, 34th Infantry Division. On that day, near Cisterna, Italy, he repeatedly attacked German positions alone and captured many prisoners. He was subsequently promoted to second lieutenant and, on January 8, 1945, was awarded the Medal of Honor. He was the 33rd Virginian to receive the Medal of Honor.

Dervishian reached the rank of colonel before leaving the Army in 1968. He died at the age of 67.

== Medal of Honor citation ==
Dervishian's official Medal of Honor citation reads: "General Order No. 3, 8 Jan. 1945 Citation"

For conspicuous gallantry and intrepidity at risk of life above and beyond the call of duty on May 23, 1944, in the vicinity of Cisterna, Italy. 2d Lt. Dervishian (then Tech. Sgt.) and 4 members of his platoon found themselves far ahead of their company after an aggressive advance in the face of enemy artillery and sniper fire. Approaching a railroad embankment, they observed a force of German soldiers hiding in dugouts. 2d Lt. Dervishian, directing his men to cover him, boldly moved forward and firing his carbine forced 10 Germans to surrender. His men then advanced and captured 15 more Germans occupying adjacent dugouts. The prisoners were returned to the rear to be picked up by advancing units. From the railroad embankment, 2d Lt. Dervishian and his men then observed 9 Germans who were fleeing across a ridge. He and his men opened fire and 3 of the enemy were wounded. As his men were firing, 2d Lt. Dervishian, unnoticed, fearlessly dashed forward alone and captured all of the fleeing enemy before his companions joined him on the ridge. At this point 4 other men joined 2d Lt. Dervishian's group. An attempt was made to send the 4 newly arrived men along the left flank of a large, dense vineyard that lay ahead, but murderous machinegun fire forced them back. Deploying his men, 2d Lt. Dervishian moved to the front of his group and led the advance into the vineyard. He and his men suddenly became pinned down by a machinegun firing at them at a distance of 15 yards. Feigning death while the hostile weapon blazed away at him, 2d Lt. Dervishian assaulted the position during a halt in the firing, using a hand grenade and carbine fire, and forced the 4 German crewmembers to surrender. The 4 men on the left flank were now ordered to enter the vineyard but encountered machinegun fire which killed 1 soldier and wounded another. At this moment the enemy intensified the fight by throwing potato-masher grenades at the valiant band of American soldiers within the vineyard. 2d Lt. Dervishian ordered his men to withdraw; but instead of following, jumped into the machinegun position he had just captured and opened fire with the enemy weapon in the direction of the second hostile machinegun nest. Observing movement in a dugout 2 or 3 yards to the rear, 2d Lt. Dervishian seized a machine pistol. Simultaneously blazing away at the entrance to the dugout to prevent its occupants from firing and firing his machinegun at the other German nest, he forced 5 Germans in each position to surrender. Determined to rid the area of all Germans, 2d Lt. Dervishian continued his advance alone. Noticing another machinegun position beside a house, he picked up an abandoned machine pistol and forced 6 more Germans to surrender by spraying their position with fire. Unable to locate additional targets in the vicinity, 2d Lt. Dervishian conducted these prisoners to the rear. The prodigious courage and combat skill exhibited by 2d Lt. Dervishian are exemplary of the finest traditions of the U.S. Armed Forces.

In his speech on the occasion of "Dervishian Day" in his hometown of Richmond, Virginia, he stated: "God's hand [had been] on my shoulder....I was lucky. My thoughts and your thoughts go out to those who have been killed, those have been wounded, those who are missing, those who are prisoners of war. They are all due equal credit, if credit is to be bestowed for doing one's duty. Countless others performed acts equal to mine. They were not so lucky."

== See also ==
- List of Medal of Honor recipients
- List of Medal of Honor recipients for World War II
