= Geben, Kahramanmaraş =

Geben
- Neighbourhood
- Location in Turkey
- Coordinates: 37°47′N 36°27′E
- Country: Turkey
- Province: Kahramanmaraş
- District: Andırın
- Elevation: 1,360 m (4,460 ft)
- Population (2022): 1,448
- Time zone: UTC+3 (TRT)
- Postal code: 46400
- Area code: 0344

Geben (from Armenian: Կապան, romanized: Kapan) is a neighbourhood of the municipality and district of Andırın, Kahramanmaraş Province, Turkey. Its population is 1,448 (2022). Before the 2013 reorganisation, it was a town (belde).

It is a mountain town, the distance to Andırın being about 30 kilometres (19 mi). Near the settlement of Geben is a large baronial castle primarily of Armenian construction (late 11th to 13th c.) with probable late antique/Byzantine remains and a period of Crusader occupation. The two baileys are well-protected with rounded towers. This site was the guardian of the strategic road at the Meryemçil Pass, connecting Cappadocia to the Armenian Kingdom of Cilicia. The remains of a late antique/medieval settlement are in the valley below to the southeast. An extensive photographic survey, description and plan of Geben Castle / Kahramanmaraş was made between 1973 and 1979. This road now used only by Geben residents was an important caravan route in history which connected East Mediterranean cities to Central Anatolia.

== See also ==
- List of Crusader castles
