= Armenian delegation at the Berlin Congress =

Diplomatic mission dissolved in 1878

- Dissolved: July 13, 1878
- Types: Diplomatic mission
- Purpose: Reforms achieved in Ottoman Armenia
- Location: Congress of Berlin
- Chief Executives: Mkrtich Khrimian
- Affiliations: Armenian Patriarchate of Constantinople, Armenian National Assembly

The Armenian delegation at the Berlin Congress was a diplomatic mission led by Archbishop Mkrtich Khrimian, whose objective was to advocate for the interests of Ottoman Armenians before the Great Powers following the Russian victory over the Ottoman Empire in the Russo-Turkish War of 1877-1878. This congress marked the inception of the Armenian Question.

== Context ==
The Russo-Turkish War of 1877-1878 witnessed Russian advances in Ottoman Armenia, with the imperial army successfully capturing Bayazet and Kars between late 1877 and early 1878. As they advanced, irregular Kurdish troops and bashi-bazouks looted and burned several Armenian border villages, leading Armenians in the region to welcome the Russians as liberators. The Russian generals in command of this front—Mikhail Loris-Melikov, Arshak Ter-Gukasov, and Ivan Lazarev—were themselves Armenians.

From the Russo-Turkish War to the Treaty of Berlin (1878)

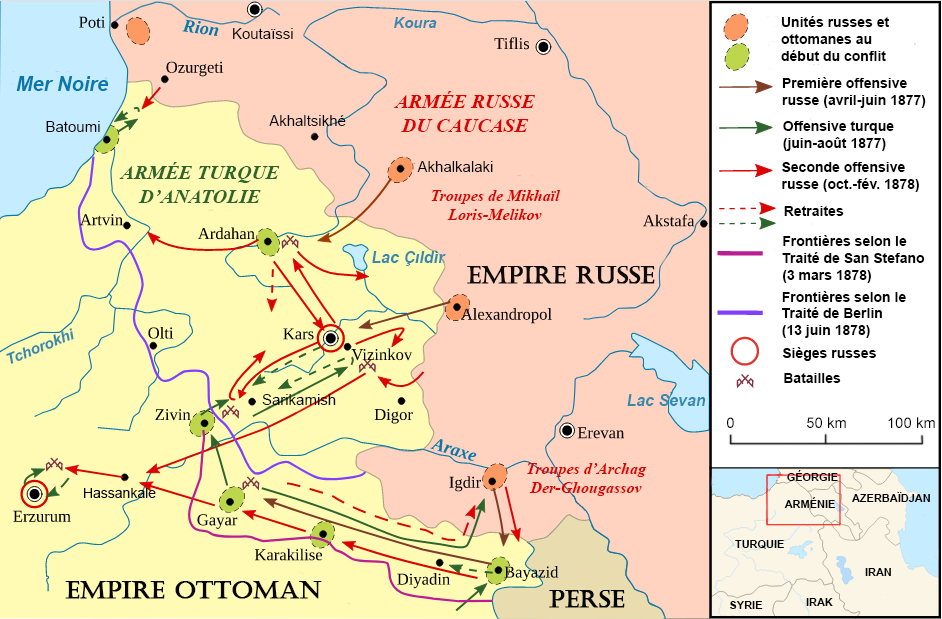
The Caucasus front during the Russo-Turkish war of 1877-1878.

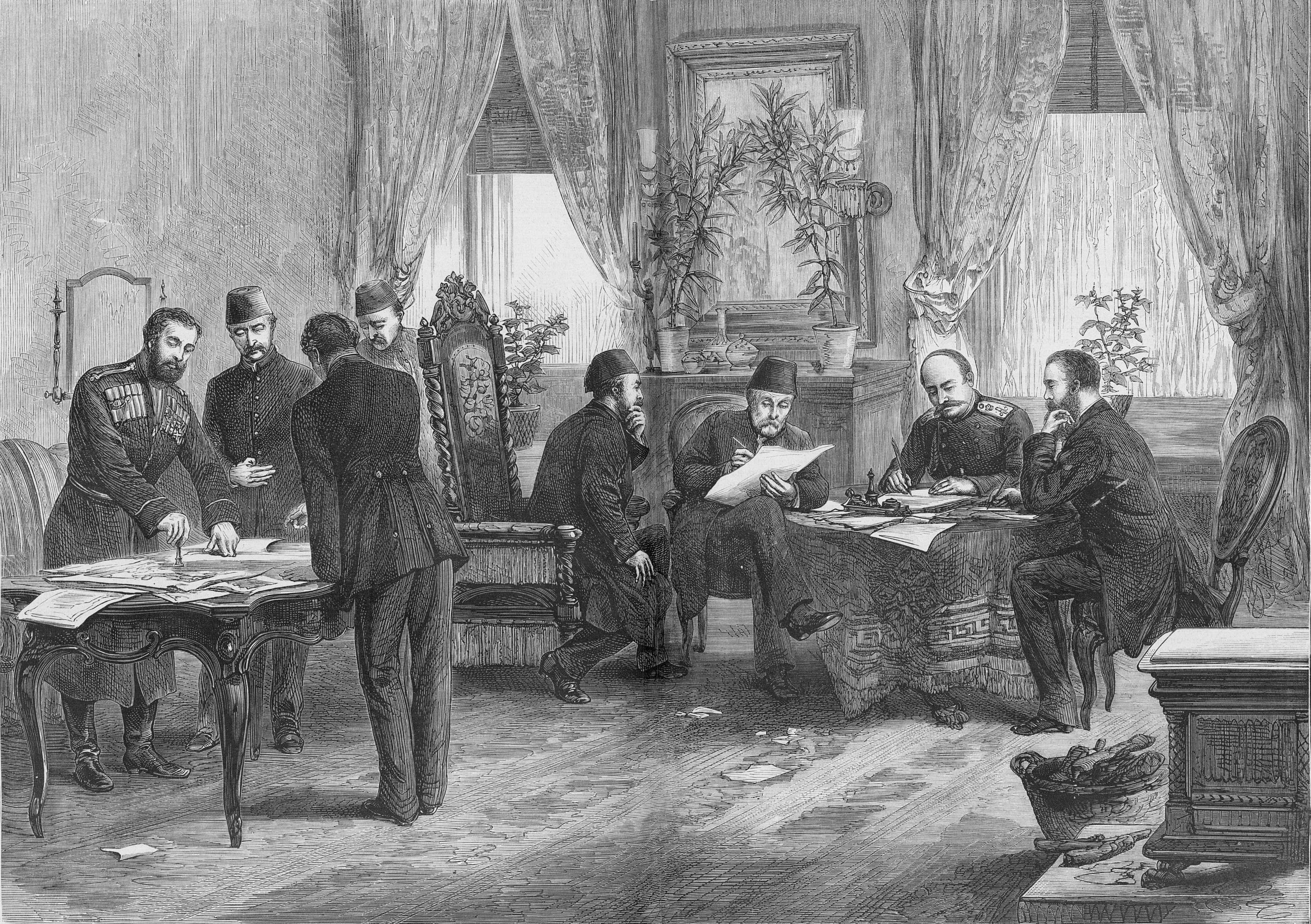
The signing of the Treaty of San Stefano (March 3, 1878).

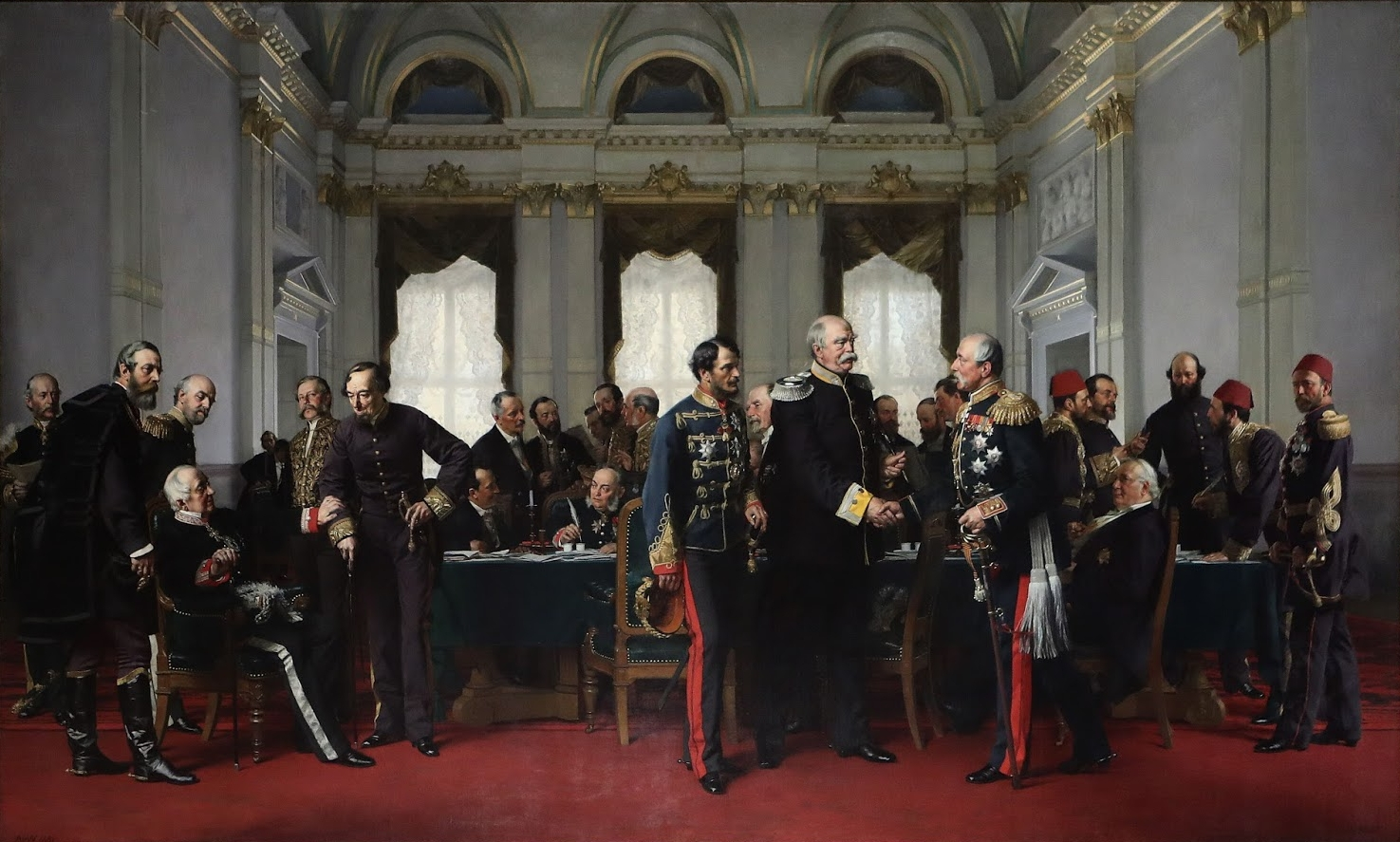
The Berlin Congress (summer 1878) by Anton von Werner (1881).

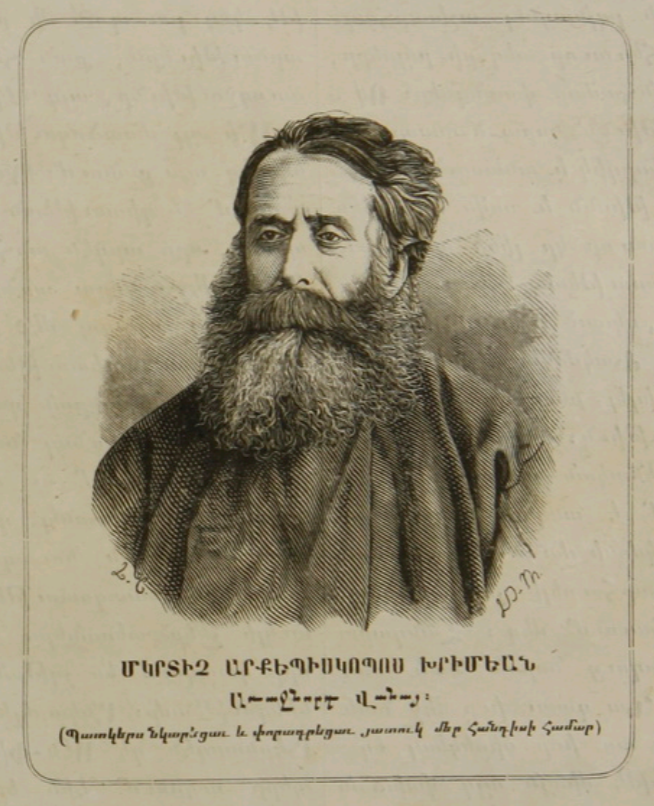
Mkrtich Khrimian shortly after the Berlin Congress.

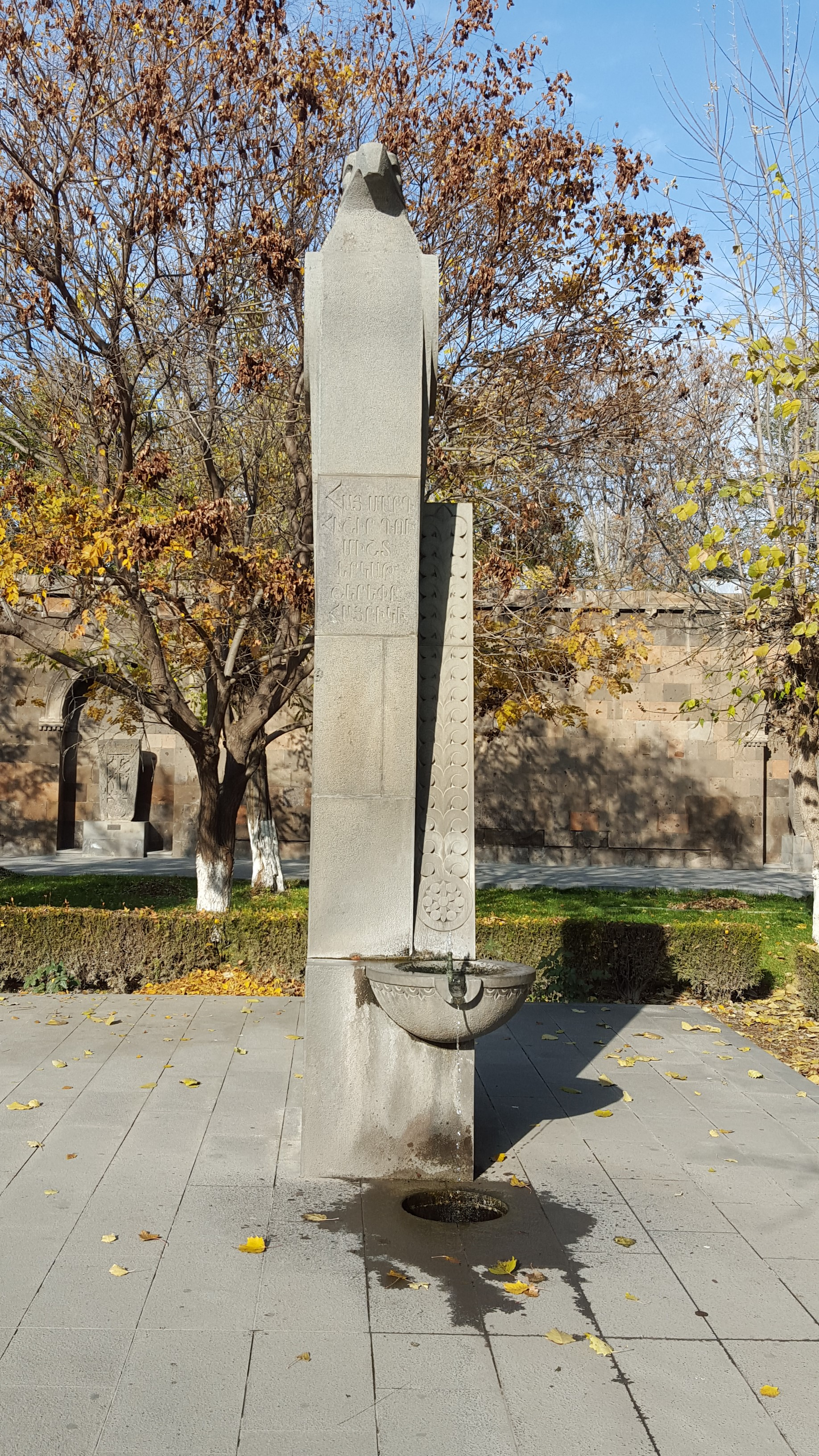
Monument to Mkrtich Khrimian in Etchmiadzin, Armenia. The inscription reads: “Armenian people, always remember your father's iron ladle”.

In the meantime, the Armenian Patriarch of Constantinople, Nerses Varzhapetyan, and the Armenian National Assembly viewed this triumph as a potential opportunity. They directed the Armenian bishop of Adrianople to request that Grand Duke Nicholas Nikolaevich, who had taken control of the city, incorporate stipulations regarding the autonomy of the Armenian provinces within the Ottoman Empire in the proposed peace treaty. The Grand Duke expressed positive sentiments towards this proposition.

The Armenians were able to secure Article 16 of the Treaty of San Stefano (dated March 3, 1878) from the Russian negotiators. This article provided immediate reforms for Ottoman Armenians. The text of the article is provided below for reference:

Article 16: The evacuation of territories occupied by Russian troops in Armenia, which are to be returned to Turkey, could potentially give rise to conflicts and complications that would be detrimental to the positive relations between the two countries. In light of this, the Sublime Porte has undertaken to implement the necessary improvements and reforms in the provinces inhabited by Armenians without delay and to guarantee their security against the Kurds and Circassians.

The term "administrative autonomy" was initially employed instead of "improvements and reforms," but the text was subsequently modified at the behest of the British.

The troops under the command of Loris-Melikov were charged with the occupation of Erzurum until Tsar Alexander II could be assured of the protection of the local Christian populations. Consequently, these reforms were subject to Russia's control as the occupying power.

== The Congress of Berlin ==
The United Kingdom, under the leadership of Benjamin Disraeli, and Austria-Hungary expressed concern regarding the Russian expansion at the expense of the Ottoman Empire and the subsequent weakening of the latter. In response, the British requested the organization of a congress. Consequently, the Treaty of San Stefano was revised during the Congress of Berlin, held in the summer of 1878.

An Armenian delegation, headed by Mkrtich Khrimian (accompanied notably by Minas Tchéraz) and comprising another archbishop and two deputies from the Armenian Assembly, proceeded to the congress with the approval of Nerses Varzhapetyan, the Armenian Patriarch of Constantinople. The objective was to present a project for the administrative autonomy of Armenia, inspired by the 1861 status of Lebanon. The plan proposed the appointment of an Armenian governor in Erzurum by the Ottoman government, the implementation of judicial, fiscal, and police reforms under the control of an international commission, the formation of mixed Christian-Muslim militias, the extension of male suffrage, and the local utilization of tax revenues. On their way to the congress, the delegation visited European capitals intending to influence the diplomats attending Berlin. In London, they met with the British Foreign Secretary, Lord Salisbury, who was unable to offer any guarantees. Their meetings with diplomats in Paris and Rome were similarly unsuccessful. Meanwhile, Khoren Nar Bey Kalfayan was dispatched to Saint Petersburg to deliver a memorandum to Tsar Alexander II, requesting autonomy for the Armenian provinces.

Regrettably, Mkrtich Khrimian's delegation was not permitted to attend the congress proceedings, a decision that was met with considerable disappointment.

The Congress resulted in the Treaty of Berlin (July 13, 1878), where Article 61, concerning the Armenians, represented a dilution of the promises outlined in Article 16 of the Treaty of San Stefano. The reforms that had been promised were now the sole responsibility of the Ottoman Empire. While the document mentioned the need for reforms in the Armenian provinces, it placed their implementation under the supervision of the powers, a concerted effort that was unlikely to succeed:

Article 61: The Sublime Porte shall proceed without further delay with implementing the requisite improvements and reforms under the specific local needs of the Armenian-inhabited provinces. Furthermore, it shall guarantee the security of these provinces against incursions by Circassians and Kurds. It shall provide regular updates to the Powers regarding the measures taken to this effect, which they shall oversee.

== The "Iron Ladle": Disappointment and consequences ==
On the day of the treaty's signing, Mkrtich Khrimian sent a letter to the diplomats expressing his regret that his legitimate and modest demands had been ignored. "The Armenians have come to understand that they have been misled, that their rights have not been acknowledged because they have pursued a policy of peaceful resistance. The Armenian delegation returns to the East, bearing this understanding with it. Nevertheless, it declares that the Armenian people will persist in making their voices heard until Europe meets their just demands," he concluded in his letter.

Upon his return, Khrimian was inspired to deliver a renowned sermon at the Armenian Cathedral in Constantinople's Kumkapı district:

My dear and blessed compatriots. You are attentively listening, filled with hopeful impatience, waiting to know what good news Father Khrimian has brought back from the Congress of Berlin and what, according to Article 61, the great powers of the world have offered to the regions inhabited by Armenians. Listen carefully to what I am about to tell you. Take time to understand the meaning of my words and weigh them.

As you know, we went to Berlin, according to the wish of Patriarch Nerses and the National Assembly, as representatives to defend the Armenian cause before the great powers. We had high hopes that the Congress would bring peace to the world and freedom to persecuted small nations. The congress began, and the delegates of the great powers gathered around tables covered with green cloth while the delegates of the small nations waited outside. On one of the tables, in the center of the meeting hall, there was a large pot of harissa from which peoples and governments, both great and small, were about to take a share. Among the audience, there was talk of the East and the West, and after long discussions, they began, one by one, to call in the representatives of the small nations. First, the Bulgarian entered, then the Serb, the Montenegrin, and the sound of the clattering swords hanging from their belts caught everyone's attention. After lengthy discussions, these three delegates drew their swords and used them as iron ladles, dipping them into the pot of harissa and taking their share! Then they left, proud and confident. Then it was the turn of the Armenian delegation. I approached and presented the petition entrusted to me by the National Assembly, begging them to fill my bowl with harissa. Then the plenipotentiaries standing by the pot asked me, 'Where is your iron ladle? Indeed, we are distributing harissa, but those without an iron ladle cannot take any. In the future, when harissa is served again, do not come without an iron ladle, or you will go home empty-handed.' Well, my dear compatriots, I could have dipped my paper ladle into the pot of harissa! But it would have disintegrated. Requests and petitions have no place where weapons speak, and swords shine.

The Montenegrins, Bulgarians, and other delegates had arrived accompanied by warriors, and from their swords, which they wore at their sides, blood was observed to drip. Upon observing these individuals, I turned my attention to the search for my Armenian warriors, hailing from Zeitun, Sason, Shatakh, and other nearby regions. However, the question remained as to their whereabouts. I inquire of my esteemed compatriots: where were these warriors? It would have been advantageous to have had one or two of the warriors present to demonstrate the capabilities of the iron ladles to the politicians at the Congress. "Here they are, ready to be drawn!" Unfortunately, I only had a petition with me. It disintegrated in the harissa, and we returned empty-handed. In comparison to the other delegates, I was taller and more handsome. However, this did not result in any tangible benefits. The petition was merely a piece of paper, not a sword. Consequently, we did not receive any harissa. Nevertheless, the Congress of Berlin had some positive outcomes in the long term.

My fellow citizens, it has become evident that using weapons can achieve the same results as they typically do. Therefore, I urge you, especially those from the provinces, to bring weapons to your families and friends when you return to our homeland. It is crucial to obtain weapons and more weapons and to continue acquiring them. Most importantly, place your hope for liberation in yourselves. Arm yourselves mentally and physically, because you must rely on yourselves to be saved.

Because the principalities of Bulgaria, Serbia, and Montenegro were liberating themselves from Ottoman rule by force of arms during the Russo-Turkish war and then by diplomacy at the Congress of Berlin, Mkrtich Khrimian could only urge his compatriots to take up arms themselves in order to achieve self-determination. The Armenian delegation at the Congress of Berlin, and the sermon delivered afterward by its leader, constituted a significant factor in the gradual emergence of the Armenian national liberation movement.

The initial mention of the Armenian Question at an international conference marked its transition into an international issue. Despite this, Article 61, which was designed to address the issue, was never implemented. Russia consented to withdraw its troops before the implementation of the reforms, which resulted in the exodus of numerous Armenians to Russia. The Treaty of Berlin, however, became a source of hope for Armenians while also feeding Ottoman authorities' mistrust of this minority, now perceived as a persistent threat to the sovereignty of the Ottoman Empire. In an address to the Armenian National Assembly, Nerses Varzhapetyan articulated his hope that future reforms would be based on Article 61 while proclaiming Armenians' loyalty to the Ottoman Empire.

Following the Congress, the Armenian Question was largely eclipsed by the Great Powers, who were preoccupied with the expansion of their colonial empires in Africa and Asia. They favored economic imperialism as a means of extending their influence in the Ottoman Empire. Therefore, until 1881, the Great Powers limited themselves to sending largely similar notes to the Sultan, reminding him of his obligations. However, their joint initiative subsequently faltered: Germany and Austria withdrew, and Russia, now under the rule of Alexander III following his father's assassination that same year, lost interest in the Armenian Question. Armenians in the Empire's eastern provinces continued to endure mistreatment, as evidenced by the documentation of such incidents by British consuls stationed in the region.

== See also ==
- Congress of Berlin • Treaty of Berlin (1878)
- Armenian question
- Six Vilayets • Western Armenia
- Armenians in the Ottoman Empire
- Armenian national movement

== Bibliography ==
- Zohrab, Krikor (1913). La Question arménienne à la lumière des documents (in French). Paris: Agustin Challamel. Archived from the original on December 27, 2023.
- Nalbandian, Louise (1963). The Armenian revolutionary movement : The development of Armenian political parties through the nineteenth century. University of California Press. Archived from the original on July 17, 2018.
- Hovannisian, Richard G (2004). "The Armenian Question in the Ottoman Empire, 1876-1914". The Armenian People From Ancient to Modern Times, vol. II : Foreign Dominion to Statehood: The Fifteenth Century to the Twentieth Century. Palgrave Macmillan. pp. 203–238. ISBN 978-1-4039-6422-9.
- Mouradian, Claire (2003). "La question d'Orient ou la sanglante agonie de " l'homme malade "". Revue d'Histoire de la Shoah (in French). 177–178 (1-2 « Ailleurs, hier, autrement : connaissance et reconnaissance du génocide des Arméniens »). Centre de documentation juive contemporaine: 63–87. doi:10.3917/rhsho1.177.0061. Archived from the original on September 9, 2024.
- Kévorkian, Raymond (2006). Le Génocide des Arméniens (in French). Éditions Odile Jacob. ISBN 978-2-7381-1830-1. Archived from the original on September 22, 2022.
- Ter Minassian, Anahide (2007). "L'Arménie et l'éveil des nationalités (1800-1914)". Histoire du peuple arménien (in French). Éditions Privat. pp. 475–521. ISBN 978-2708968745.
- Kieser, Hans-Lukas; Polatel, Mehmet; Schmutz, Thomas (2015). "Reform or cataclysm? The agreement of 8 February 1914 regarding the Ottoman eastern provinces". Journal of Genocide Research. 17 (3: The Armenian Genocide After 100 Years: New Historical Perspectives): 285–304. doi:10.1080/14623528.2015.1062283.
