= Armenian question =

Political debate of 1878 Berlin Congress

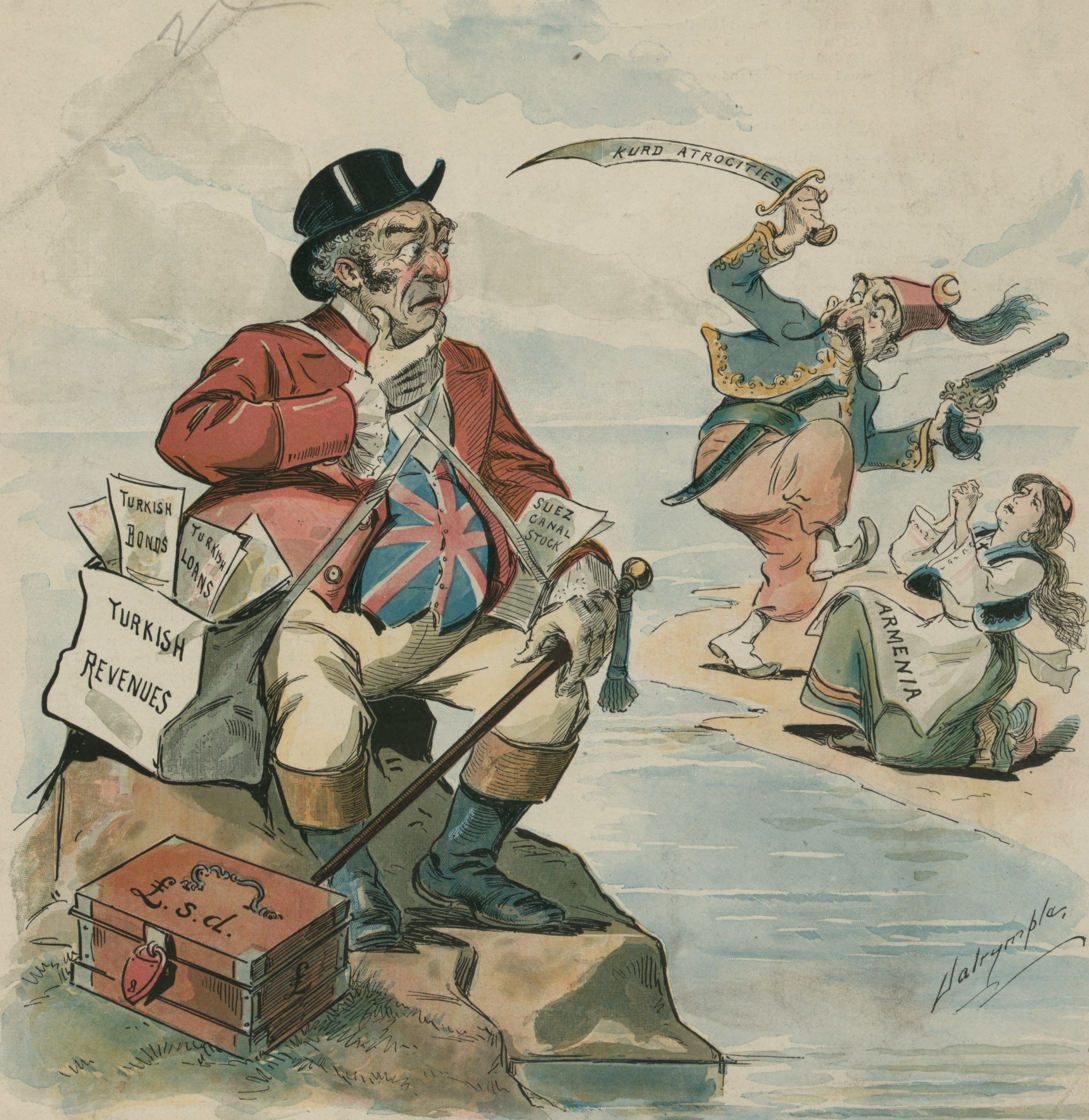
"John Bull's dilemma": "It's 'ard to 'ave to disturb 'im–'e's such a good customer!" Puck, 1895

The Armenian question was the debate following the Congress of Berlin in 1878 as to how the Armenians in the Ottoman Empire should be treated. The term became commonplace among diplomatic circles and in the popular press. In specific terms, the Armenian question refers to the protection and the freedoms of Armenians from their neighboring communities. The Armenian question explains the 40 years of Armenian–Ottoman history in the context of English, German, and Russian politics between 1877 and 1914. In 1915, the leadership of the Committee of Union and Progress, which controlled the Ottoman government, decided to end the Armenian question permanently by killing and expelling most Armenians from the empire, in the Armenian genocide.

== Background ==
"If a man is killed in Paris, it is a murder; the throats of fifty thousand people are cut in the East, and it is a question."

— Victor Hugo

Following the French Revolution, nationalism movements globally also emerged in the Ottoman Empire from the 19th century onwards, destabilizing the region. Initially, Greeks, followed by Albanians and Arabs, revolted with the help of the Great Powers, each aiming to establish their own nation-states. During this period, Greeks, Serbs, Bulgarians, and other non-Muslim groups achieved independence. The major European powers had been strategizing, at least since the 1870s, to exploit the spoils, including the manipulation of ethnic groups like the Ottoman Armenians. Fearing the effect of revolutionary ideas being imported, the Ottoman government prohibited Armenians from emigrating in 1882 and from returning in 1893.

To pursue independence, Armenians formed the Hunchak and Dashnak organizations, adopting terror and propaganda. Their strategy involved inciting conflict between Muslims and Armenians to provoke European intervention and support for an independent Armenian state in Eastern Anatolia, using terror as a primary tactic to garner support and instigate rebellion, not only in the eastern provinces but also in Istanbul. Up until 1878, they were seen as millet-i sadıka or the "loyal millet" in the Ottoman Empire.

In 1827–28, Tsar Nicholas I sought help from Persian Armenians in the Russo-Persian War, promising that afterward, he would help improve their lives. In 1828, the Russians declared war on the Ottomans. In 1828, Russia annexed the Erivan Khanate, Nakhichevan Khanate, and the surrounding countryside with the Treaty of Turkmenchay. After the Treaty of Turkmenchay, Armenians still living under Persian rule were encouraged to emigrate to Russian Armenia, and 30,000 followed the call. Russia annexed significant portions of territory occupied by the Armenians. By the 1897 Russian Census, 1,127,212 Armenians were counted in Russian lands. For the same period (1896 Vital Cuinet), there were 1,095,889 Armenians in the Ottoman Empire: As Russia advanced its southern border, it became increasingly involved with Ottoman affairs. Russia was instrumental in obtaining the independence of Romania and Serbia. Russia, and Russian life, attracted Armenians. Many Armenians became educated and adopted Russian ways. Russia was also a path to Europe for Armenians. Russia gained control over a large part of Armenia, and became the champion of Armenians in the Ottoman Empire.

== Origin ==
Internationalization

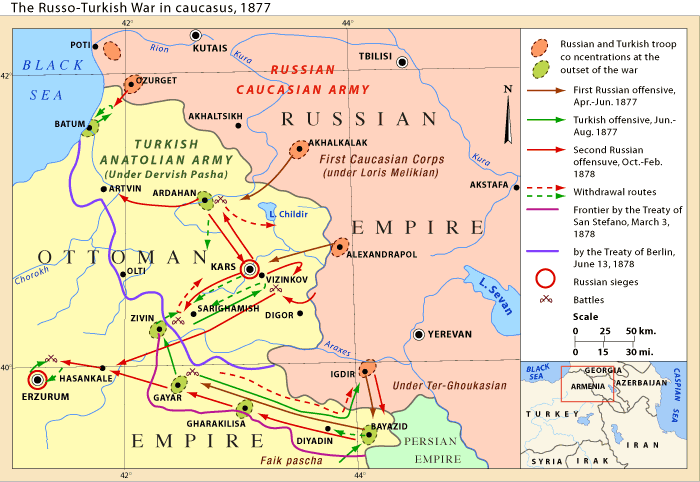
Russo-Turkish War (1877–78)

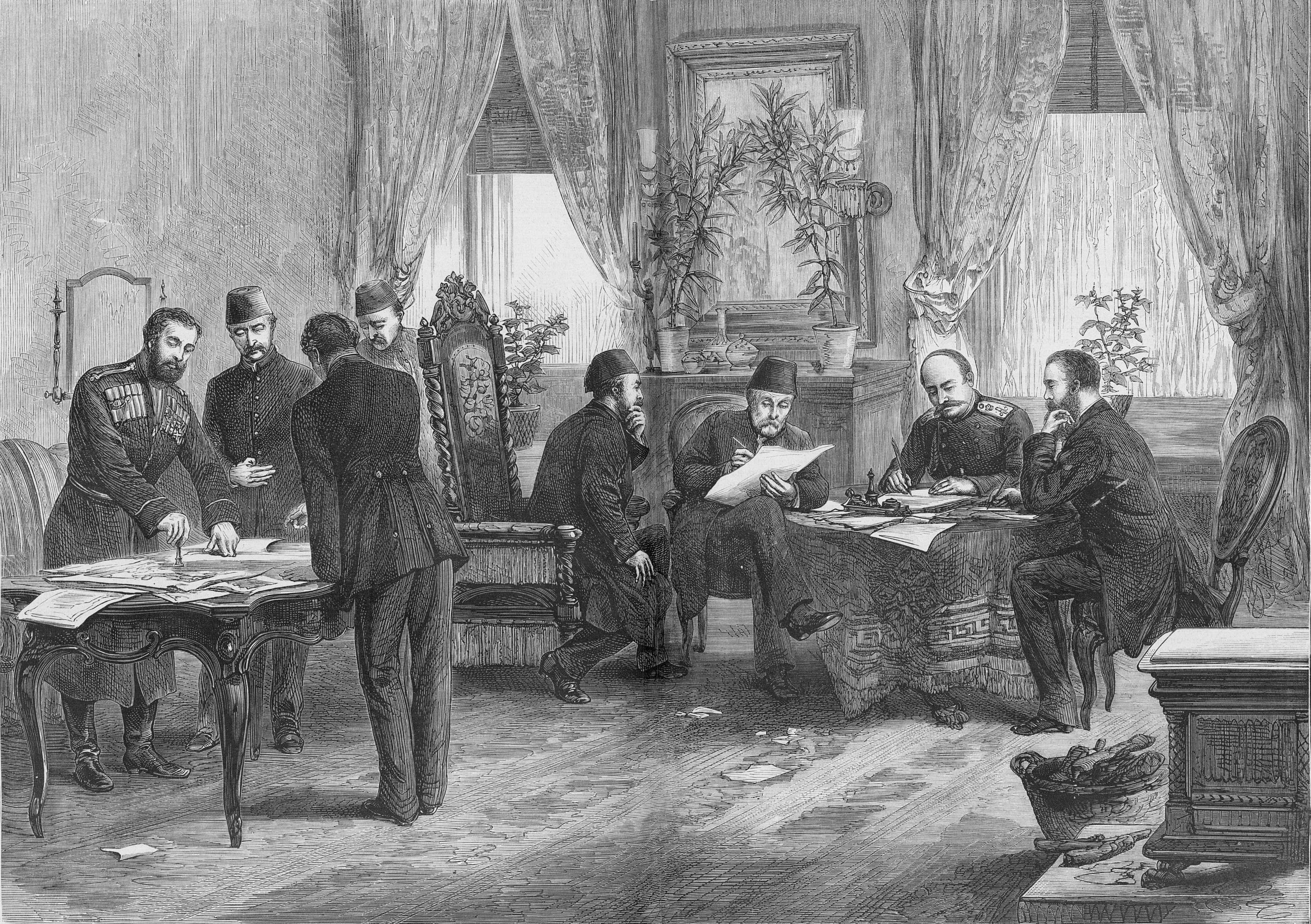
Negotiations for San Stefano Agreement included "Article 16"

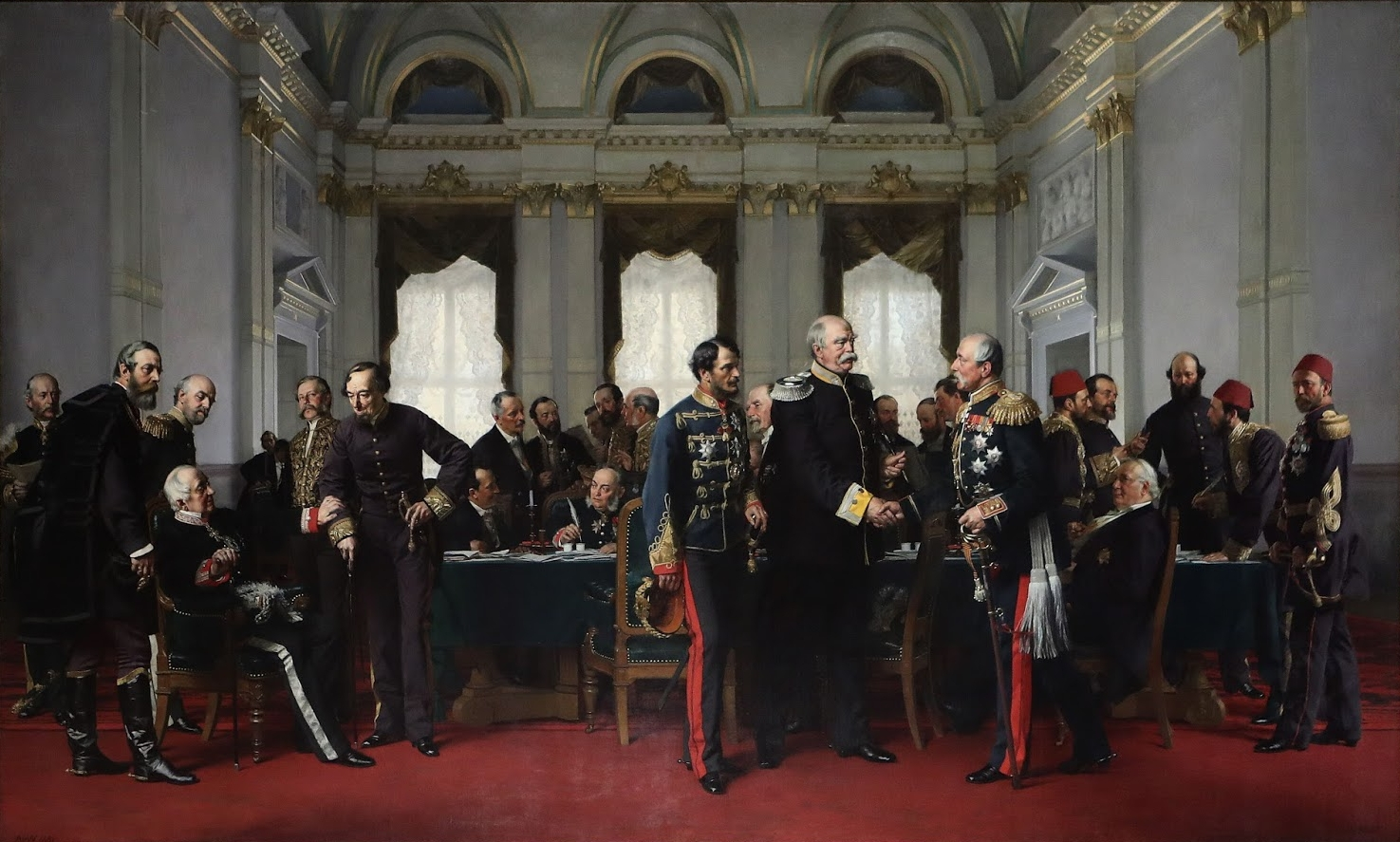
Congress of Berlin led to Treaty of Berlin (1878) which included "Article 61"

Most Armenians lived in provinces bordering Russia and not any other European states. By the Treaty of Adrianople, the Ottoman Empire ceded Akhalkalak and Akhaltsikhe to Russia. Some 25,000 Ottoman Armenians moved to Russian Armenia, emigrating from other areas of the empire. The Armenians began to look more toward the Russian Empire as the ultimate guarantors of their security.

Many Armenians in the Eastern provinces of the Ottoman Empire, living under the threat of unchecked violence and depredation on the part of aggressive neighboring peoples, greeted the advancing Russian army as liberators. In January 1878, Armenian Patriarch of Constantinople Nerses II Varzhapetian approached the Russian leadership to receive assurances that Russia would introduce provisions for Armenian self-administration in the new peace treaty.

In March 1878, after the conclusion of the Russo-Turkish War (1877–1878), the Patriarch Nerses Varzhapetian, forwarded Armenian complaints of widespread "forced land seizure ... forced conversion of women and children, arson, protection racket, rape, and murder" to the Powers. Patriarch Nerses Varzhapetian convinced Russians to insert Article 16 to Treaty of San Stefano, stipulating that the Russian forces occupying the Armenian-populated provinces in the eastern Ottoman Empire would withdraw only with the full implementation of reforms.

Though not as explicit, Article 16 of the Treaty of San Stefano read:

As the evacuation of the Russian troops of the territory they occupy in Armenia, and which is to be restored to Turkey, might give rise to conflicts and complications detrimental to the maintenance of good relations between the two countries, the Sublime Porte engaged to carry into effect, without further delay, the improvements and reforms demanded by local requirements in the provinces inhabited by Armenians and to guarantee their security from Kurds and Circassians.

But, in June 1878, Great Britain objected to Russia holding on to so much Ottoman territory and pressed for the great powers to enter into new negotiations under the Congress of Berlin. Article 16 was modified so that all mention of the Russian forces remaining in the provinces was removed. Instead, the Ottoman government was periodically to inform the Great Powers of the progress of the reforms. In the final text of the Treaty of Berlin, it was transformed into Article 61, which read:

The Sublime Porte undertakes to carry out, without further delay, the improvements and reforms demanded by local requirements in the provinces inhabited by Armenians, and to guarantee their security against the Circassians and Kurds. It will periodically make known the steps taken to this effect to the powers, who will superintend their application.

The Armenian National Assembly and Patriarch Nerses Varzhapetian asked Mkrtich Khrimian, his predecessor on Patriarchal See and future Catholicos, to present the case for the Armenians at Berlin. An Armenian delegation led by Mkrtich Khrimian traveled to Berlin to present the case of the Armenians but, much to its dismay, it was left out of the negotiations. Following the Berlin negotiations, Mkrtich Khrimian gave a famous patriotic speech, “The Paper Ladle,” advising Armenians to take the national awakening of Bulgaria (Liberation of Bulgaria) as a model for the hopes for self-determination. In Bulgarian historiography, the Liberation of Bulgaria refers to the events of the Russo-Turkish War of 1877–78 that led to the re-establishment of the Bulgarian sovereign state with the Treaty of San Stefano.

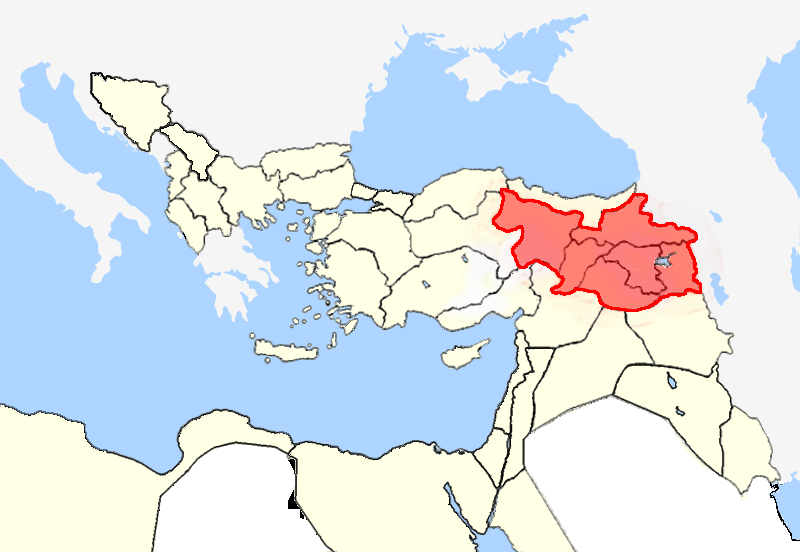
Six Armenian provinces of the Ottoman Empire

In 1880, the Armenians, especially encouraged by the prime minister Gladstone, broached the Armenian issue with the words, "To serve Armenia is to serve the Civilization". On 11 June 1880, the Great Powers sent to porte an "Identic Note" which asked for the enforcement of Article 61. This was followed on 2 January 1881 with a "British Circular on Armenia" sent to the other Powers.

== Armenian reform program ==
The Armenian reform program of 11 May 1895 was a set of reforms proposed by European Powers. French diplomat Victor Bérard wrote:

After six months of constant massacres, while Europe pretended that the Armenian Question was already solved, the Armenians decided to show Europe that the Armenian Question still existed but that there was no Ottoman government any more.

== 1914 Armenian reforms ==
The 1914 Armenian reforms were devised by the European powers in 1912–1914 that envisaged the creation of two provinces, to be placed under the supervision of two European inspectors general. They never achieved these reforms. Given the lack of visible progress in improving the plight of the Armenian community, a number of disillusioned Armenian intellectuals living in Europe and Russia in the 1880s and 1890s decided to form political parties and revolutionary societies to work to attain better conditions for their compatriots.

== Images of massacred Armenians ==
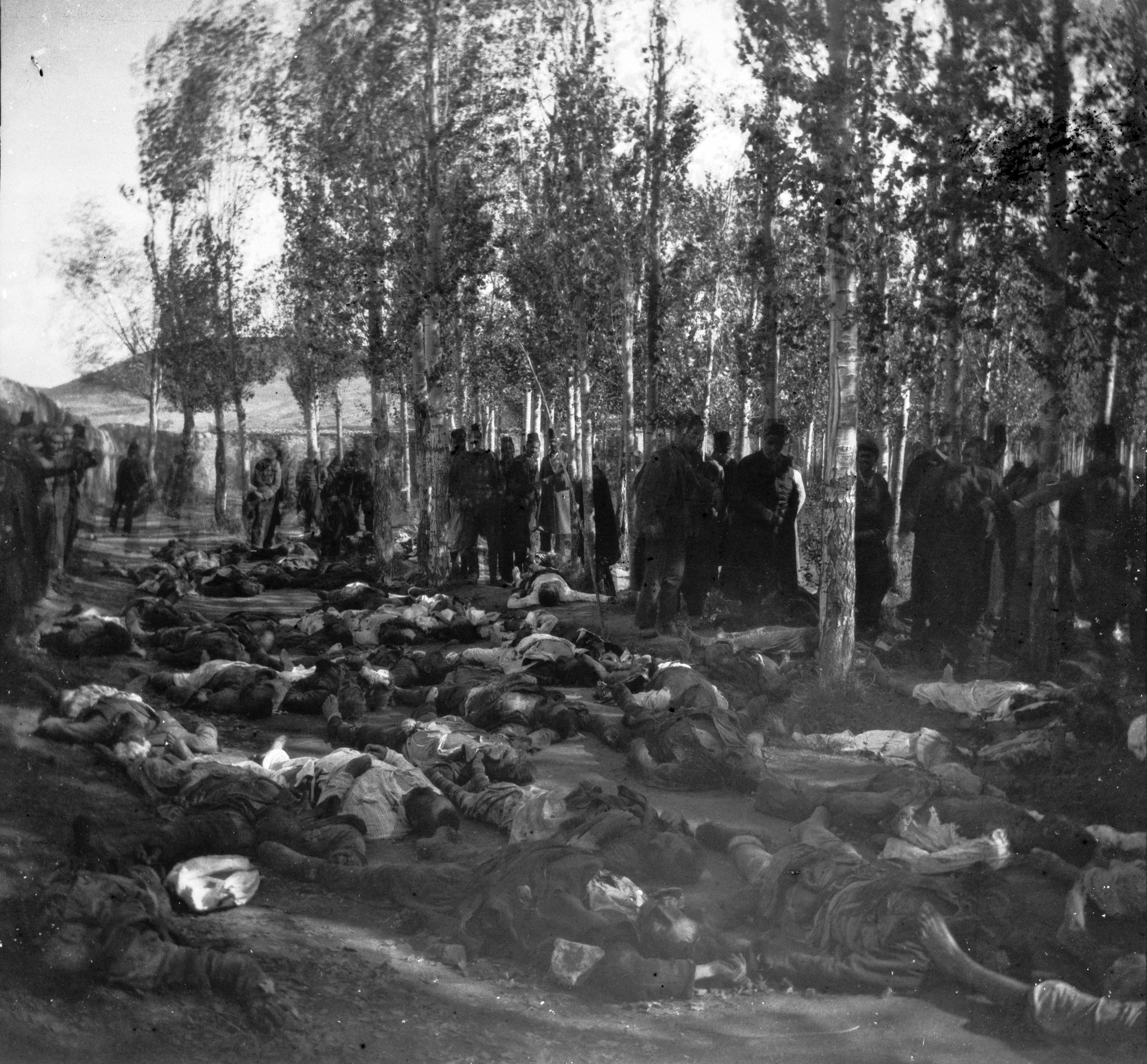
Armenian massacres in Erzurum, 1895

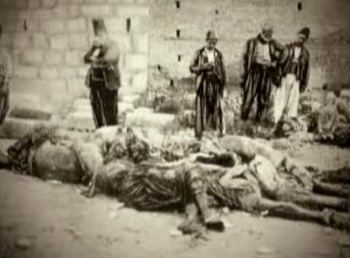
Armenian massacres in Adana, 1909

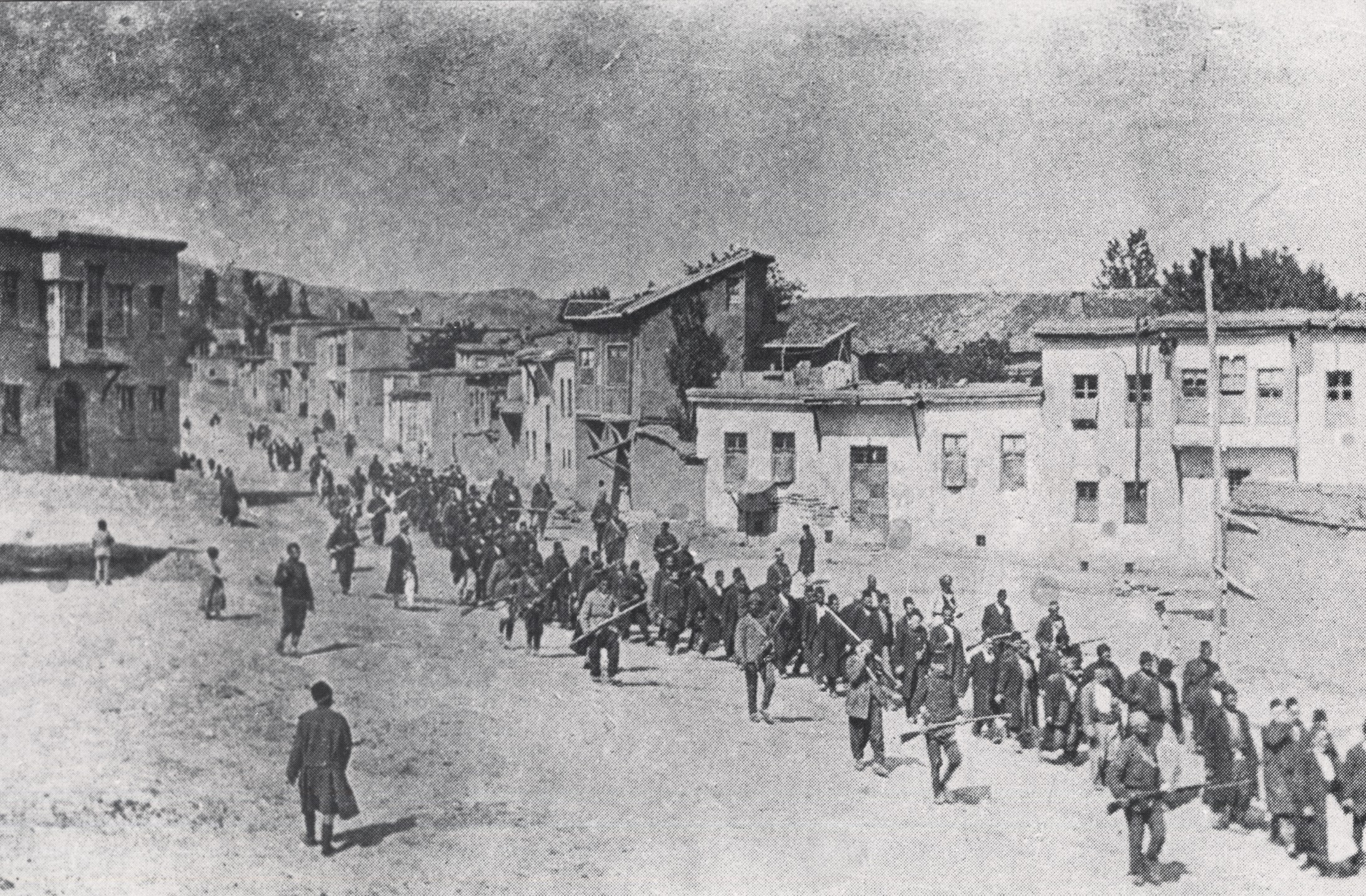
Genocide of Armenians, Vilayet of Kharberd, 1915

== See also ==
- Armenia without Armenians
- Armenian delegation at the Berlin Congress
- Armenian national movement
- Six Vilayets

== Bibliography ==
- Hooman, Peimani (2009). Conflict and Security in Central Asia and the Caucasus.
- Hovannisian, Richard G. (1986), "The Historical Dimensions of the Armenian Question, 1878–1923", The Armenian Genocide in Perspective, Routledge, ISBN 978-1-315-13102-3
- Nalbandian, Louise (1963). The Armenian revolutionary movement; the development of Armenian political parties through the nineteenth century. Berkeley, University of California Press.
- Riegg, Stephen Badalyan (2019), "British Travelers and the Armenian Question During the First Half of the 19th Century," Nationalities Papers 47, 1: 136-148.
