= Six Vilayets =

Provinces of the Ottoman Empire

Six Vilayets: ولايت سته; Վեց Հայկական Վիլայեթները
- Vilayets of Ottoman Empire
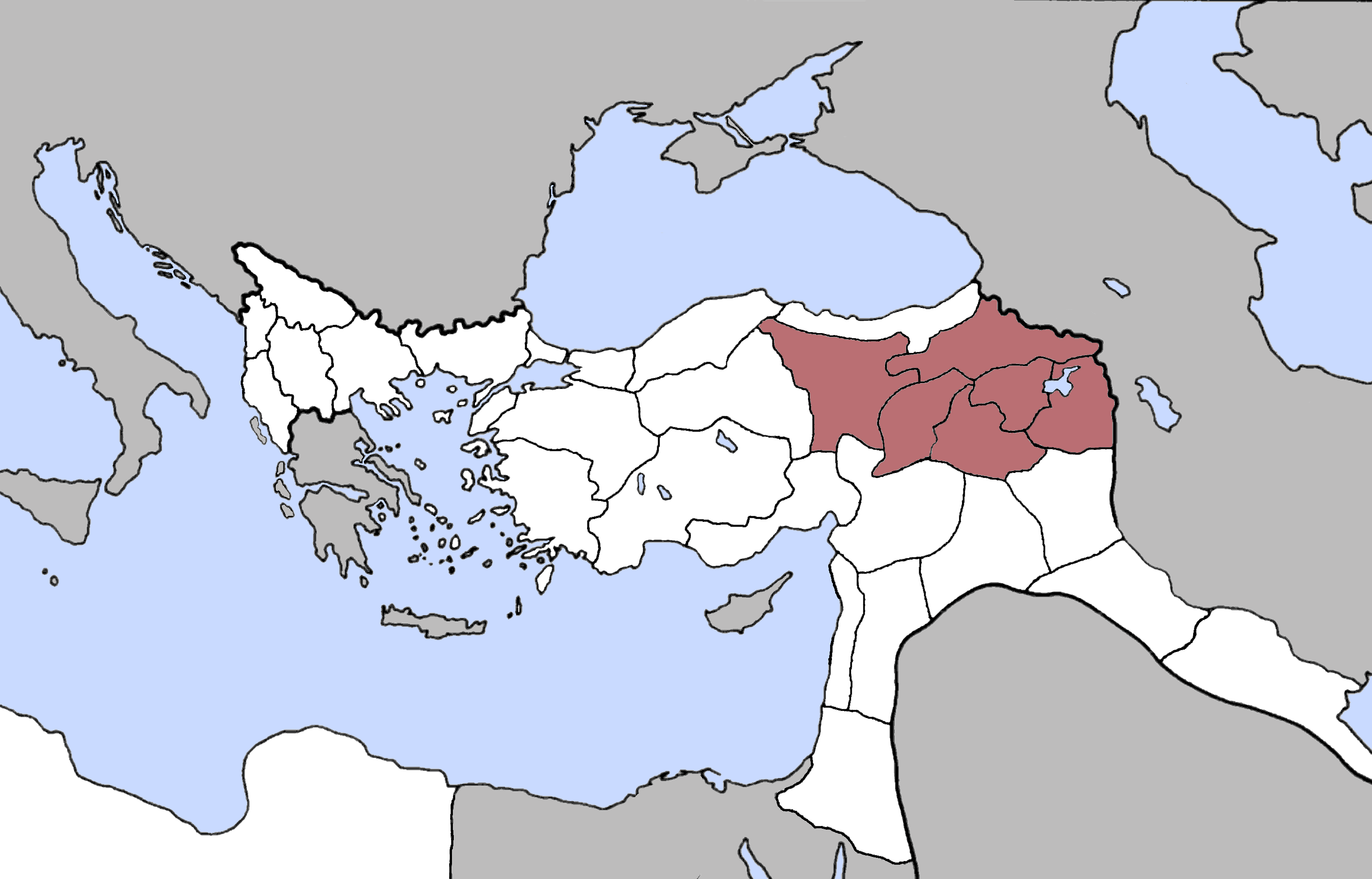
- The six Armenian provinces in early 20th century.
- Today part of: Turkey

The Six Vilayets (Ottoman Turkish: ولايت سته, Vilâyat-ı Sitte), the Six Provinces, or the Six Armenian Vilayets (Armenian: Վեց Հայկական Վիլայեթները Vets' haykakan vilayet'nery; Turkish: Altı vilayet, Altı il) were the main Armenian-populated vilayets ("provinces") of the Ottoman Empire prior to the Armenian genocide and, together, comprise most of Western Armenia. These were Bitlis, Diyarbekir, Erzurum, Mamuret-ul-Aziz, Sivas, and Van.

== Name ==
The term Six Armenian Vilayets was a diplomatic usage referring to the Ottoman provinces with substantial Armenian populations. In fact, this term was known in the diplomatic language of the time as the area for which a number of Great Powers wished reforms for the benefit of the Armenians. The term was based on the official language adopted by the signatories of the Treaty of Berlin, the final act of the Congress of Berlin in 1878, in Article LXI: “The Sublime Porte undertakes to carry out, without further delay, the improvements and reforms demanded by local requirements in the provinces inhabited by the Armenians, and to guarantee their security against the Circassians and Kurds.”

== Population ==
=== Ethnic groups ===
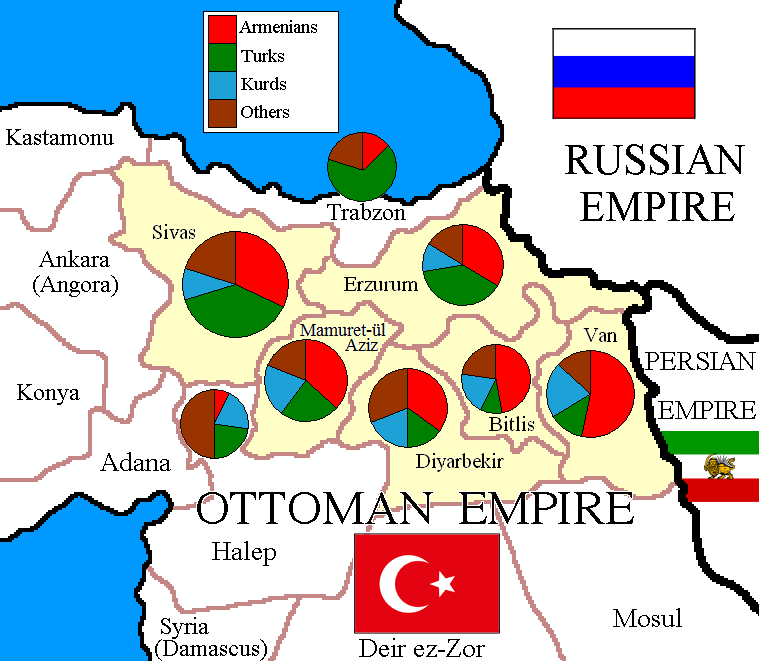
Ethnic map of the Six Vilayets according to the Armenian Patriarchate of Constantinople in 1912.

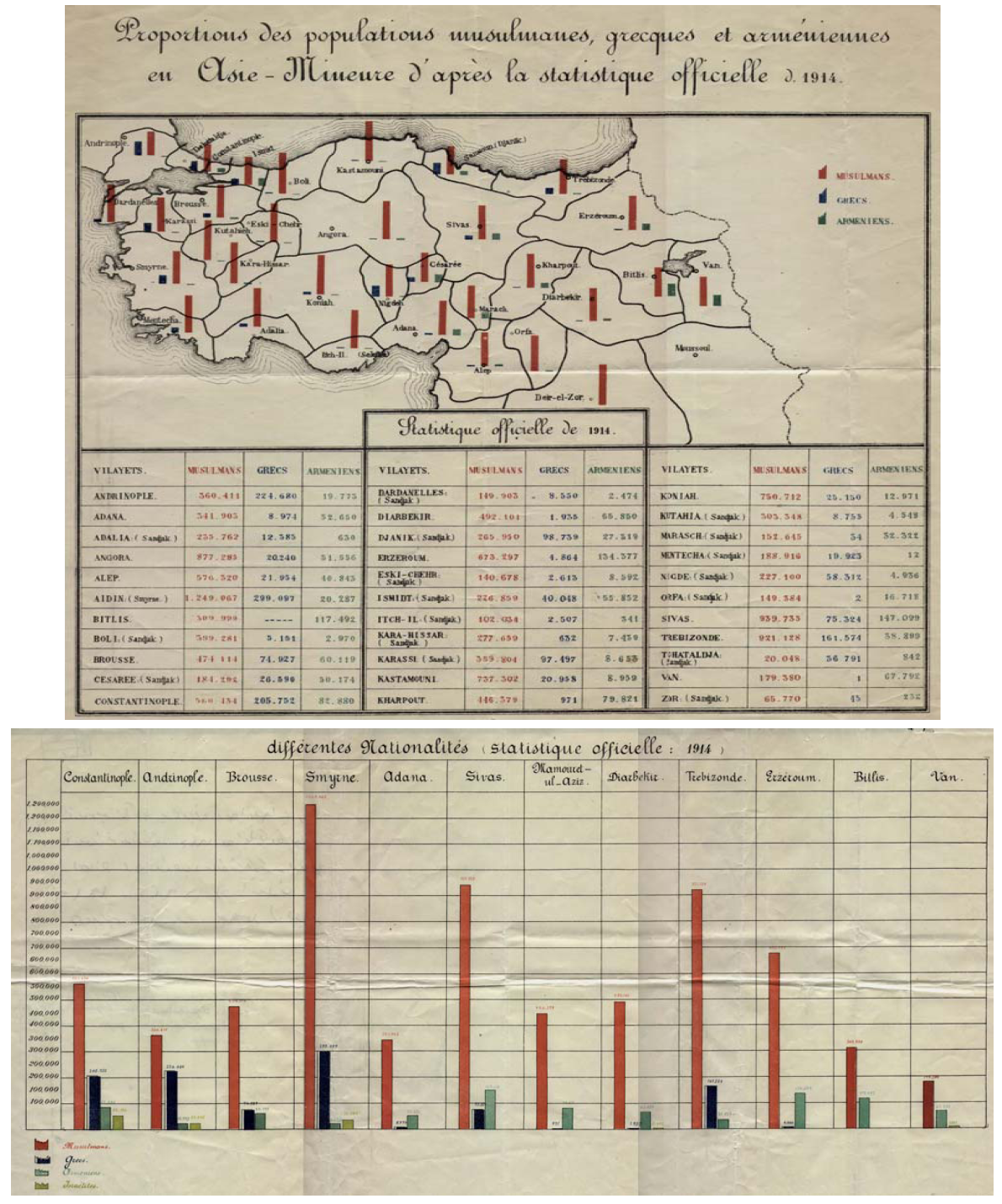
Armenian population of the Ottoman Empire according to the 1914 official population statistics.

Statistical analysis of the racial elements in the Ottoman provinces by the Armenian Patriarch of Constantinople, 1912

Note: The analysis excludes certain portions of these provinces where Armenians are only a minor element. These portions are as follows: Hakkiari, in the Vilayet of Van; the south of Sairt, in the Vilayet of Bitlis; the south of the Vilayet of Diyarbekir; the south of Malatia, in the Vilayet of Mamuret-ul-Aziz; the north-west and west of the Vilayet of Sivas.

Ethnic groups	Bitlis	Diyarbekir	Erzurum	Mamuret-ul-Aziz	Sivas	Van	TOTAL	%
Armenians	180,000	105,000	215,000	168,000	165,000	185,000	1,018,000	38.9
Turks^{1}	48,000	72,000	265,000	182,000	192,000	47,000	806,000	30.8
Kurds^{2}	77,000	55,000	75,000	95,000	50,000	72,000	499,000	19.1
Others^{3}	30,000	64,000	48,000	5,000	100,000	43,000	290,000	11.1
TOTAL	382,000	296,000	630,000	450,000	507,000	350,000	2,615,000	100
^{1} including Qizilbash^{2} including Zaza^{3} Assyrians (Nestorians, Jacobites, Chaldeans), Circassians, Greeks, Yazidis, Persians, Lazs, Roma

Ottoman official population statistics, 1914

Note: The Ottoman population statistics doesn't give information for separate Muslim ethnic groups such as the Turks, Kurds, Circassians, etc.

The official Ottoman population statistics of 1914 that were based on an earlier census underestimated the number of ethnic minorities, including the number of Armenians. The Ottoman figures didn't define any ethnic groups, only religious ones. So the “Armenian” population as counted by the authorities only tallied ethnic Armenians who were also adherents of the Armenian Apostolic Church. Ethnic Armenians who professed the Muslim faith, which by that time had grown in number, were counted only as “Muslims” (not as Armenian Muslims or Armenians), while Armenian Protestants, just as Pontic Greeks, Caucasus Greeks, and Laz, were counted as "others".

Ethnic groups	Bitlis	Diyarbekir	Erzurum	Mamuret-ul-Aziz	Sivas	Van	TOTAL	%
Muslims	309,999	492,101	673,297	446,376	939,735	179,380	3,040,888	79.6
Armenians	119,132	65,850	136,618	87,862	151,674	67,792	628,928	16.5
Others	44,348	4,020	5,797	4,047	78,173	11,969	148,354	3.9
TOTAL	473,479	561,971	815,712	538,285	1,169,582	259,141	3,818,170	100

Maps

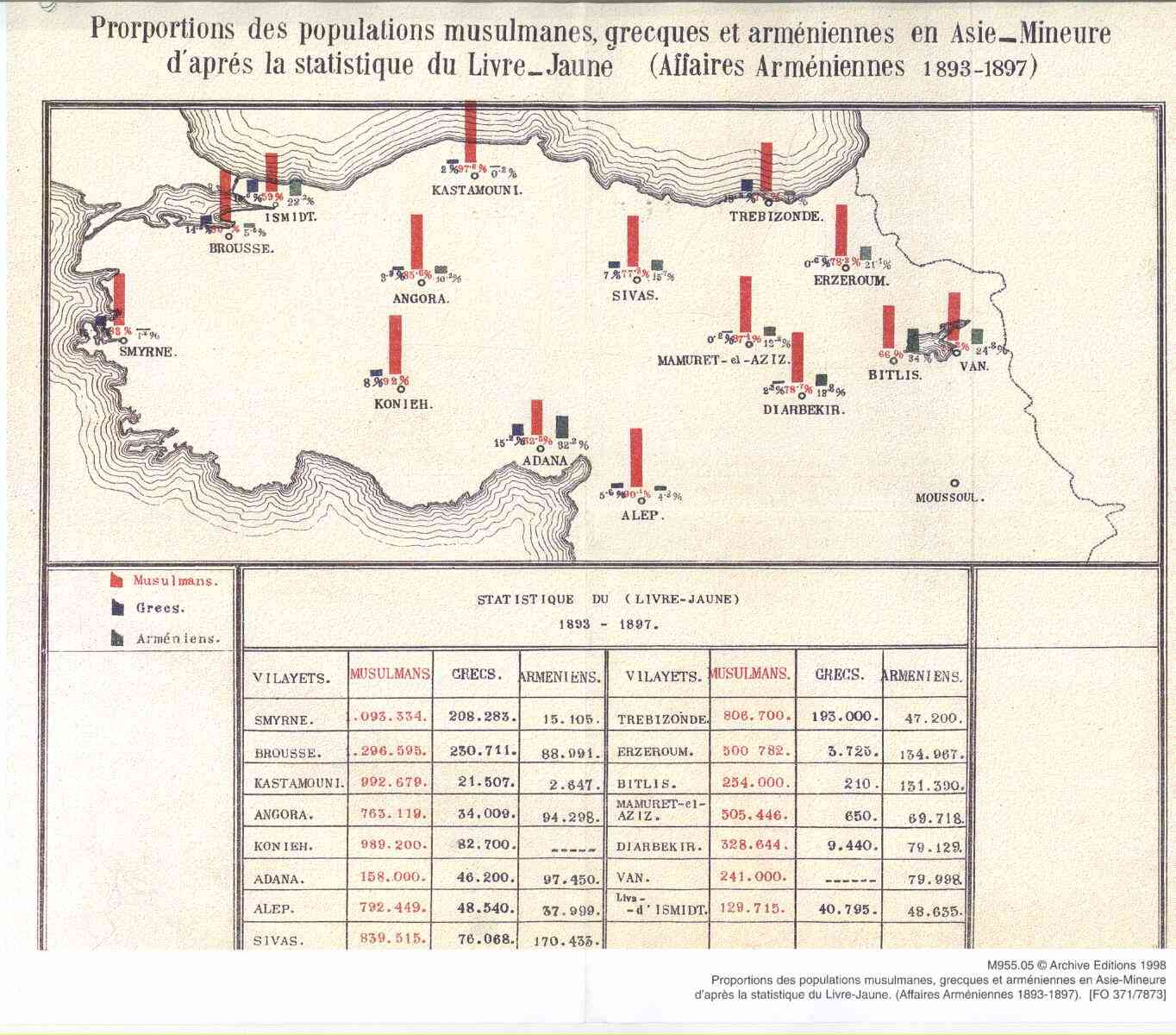
1893-96, Armenian population

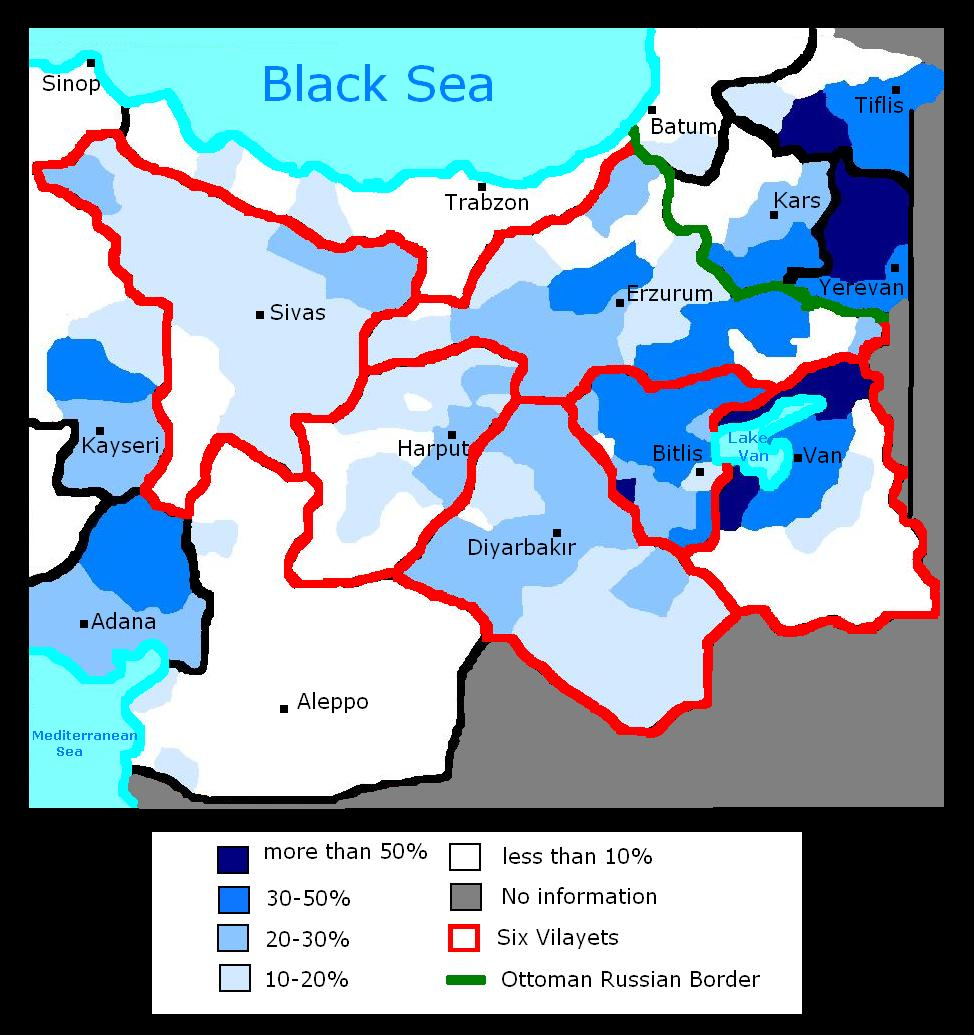
Armenian population in the Six Vilayets.

=== Largest cities ===
All figures are as of early 20th century.

City	Vilayet	Population	Armenians	%
Van	Van Vilayet	40,000	25,000	62.5%
Sivas	Sivas Vilayet	60,000	30,000	50%
Erzurum	Erzurum Vilayet	60,000	15,000	25%
Mezereh	Vilayet of Mamuret-ul-Aziz	12,000	6,000	50%
Bitlis	Bitlis Vilayet	30,000	7,000	23%
Diyarbekir	Diyarbekir Vilayet	150,000	45,000	33%
Arapgir	Vilayet of Mamuret-ul-Aziz	20,000	10,000	50%
Malatya	Vilayet of Mamuret-ul-Aziz	40,000	20,000	50%

== See also ==
- Armenian delegation at the Berlin Congress
- Armenian genocide
- Armenian highlands
- Armenian question
- Armenians in the Ottoman Empire
- Armenians in Turkey
- Caucasus campaign
- Hidden Armenians
- Kingdom of Armenia
- Late Ottoman genocides
- Occupation of Western Armenia
- Ottoman Armenian population
- Russian Armenia
- Sazonov–Paléologue Agreement
- United Armenia
- Western Armenia
- Wilsonian Armenia
