= Western Armenia =

Armenian historical region in Turkey

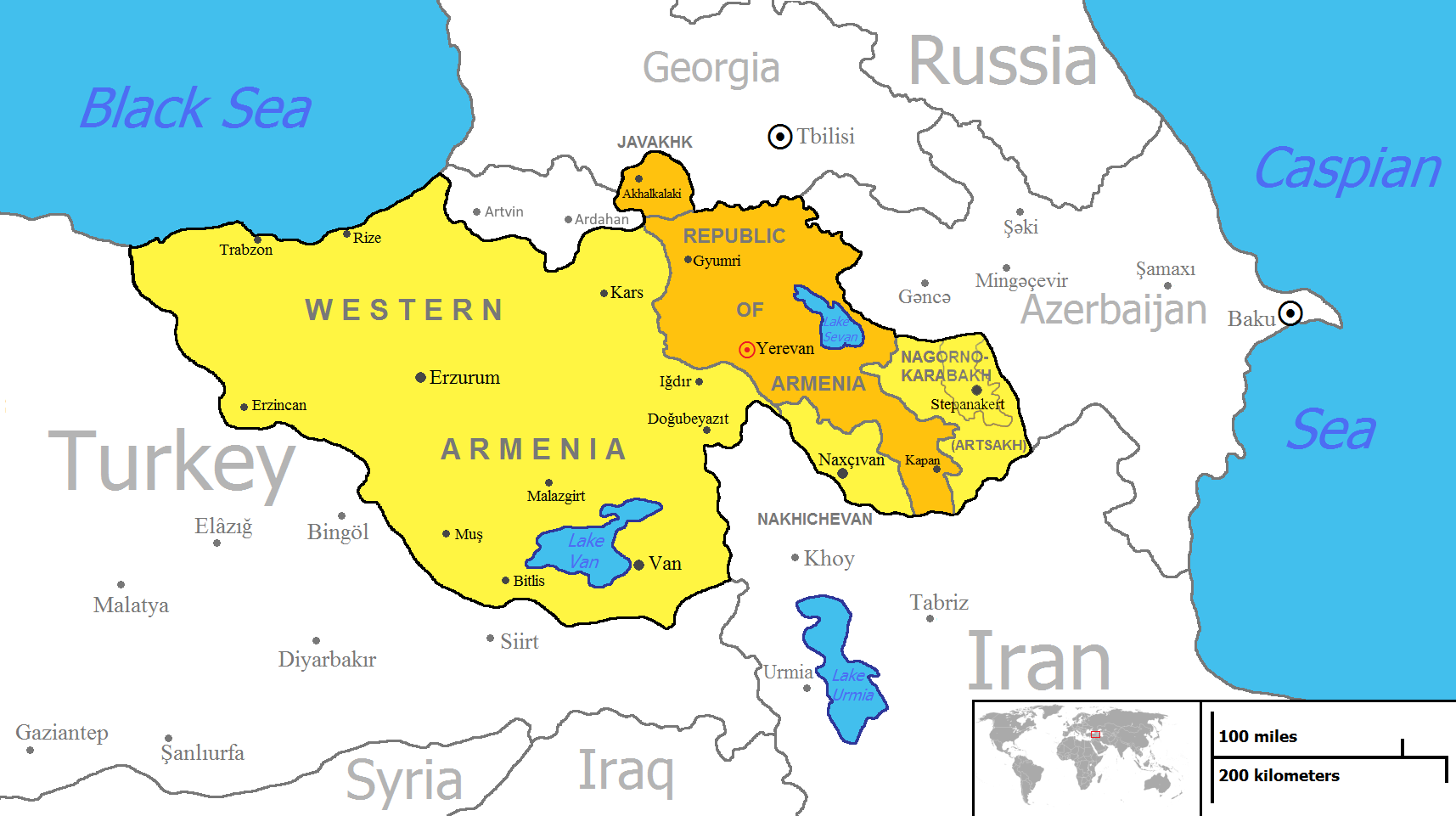
The modern concept of United Armenia as claimed by the Armenian Revolutionary Federation. Areas overwhelmingly populated by Armenians (Republic of Armenia: 98% and Javakheti: 95%). Historically Armenian areas with presently no or insignificant Armenian population after massacres (1894–1897), genocide (1915–1917) and expulsions (2023) (Western Armenia, Nakhichevan, and the former Republic of Artsakh in Nagorno-Karabakh).

Western Armenia (Western Armenian: Արեւմտեան Հայաստան, Arevmdian Hayasdan) is a term to refer to the western parts of the Armenian highlands located within Turkey (formerly the Ottoman Empire) that comprise the historical homeland of the Armenians. Western Armenia, also referred to as Byzantine Armenia, emerged following the division of Greater Armenia between the Byzantine Empire (Western Armenia) and Sassanid Persia (Eastern Armenia) in AD 387.

The area was contested during the Ottoman–Persian Wars and was conquered by the Ottoman Empire during the wars of 1532–1555 and 1623–1639. The area then became known also as "Turkish Armenia" or "Ottoman Armenia", and included six vilayets. During the 19th century, the Russian Empire conquered sections of Western Armenia, including Kars.

The planned partition of the Ottoman Empire according to the superseded Treaty of Sèvres of 1920.

The region's Armenian population was subjected to widespread massacres in the 1890s, as well as extermination and deportation during the 1915 Armenian genocide and over the following years. In addition to physical erasure, the systematic destruction of Armenian cultural heritage, which had endured over 4000 years, is an example of cultural genocide. In 1920 the Treaty of Sèvres – signed between the Ottoman Empire and the Allies Powers of World War I – called for borders where Western Armenia was included the Republic of Armenia; however, this was never implemented and the Turkish invasion of Armenia resulted in the annexation of Kars and Surmalu. These annexations were formalized by the Treaty of Alexandropol (1920), Treaty of Moscow (1920), and Treaty of Kars (1921).

Since the Armenian genocide and Turkey's invasion, Armenian—both in the diaspora and indigenous to modern Turkey—have pursued political representation or reunification with the Republic of Armenia, with a congress of genocide survivors' descendants active in the diaspora. In 2020, the three traditional Armenian parties—the Armenian Revolutionary Federation (Dashnaks), Social Democrat Hunchakian Party (Hunchaks) and the Armenian Democratic Liberal Party (Ramgavars)—issued a joint statement on the centenary of the Sèvres Treaty, stating that it is the only internationally legal document that demarcates the border between Armenia and Turkey. Transit between Western Armenia and Eastern Armenia has remained barred since 1993 due to the ongoing Turkish–Azeri blockade of Republic of Armenia.

== Etymology ==
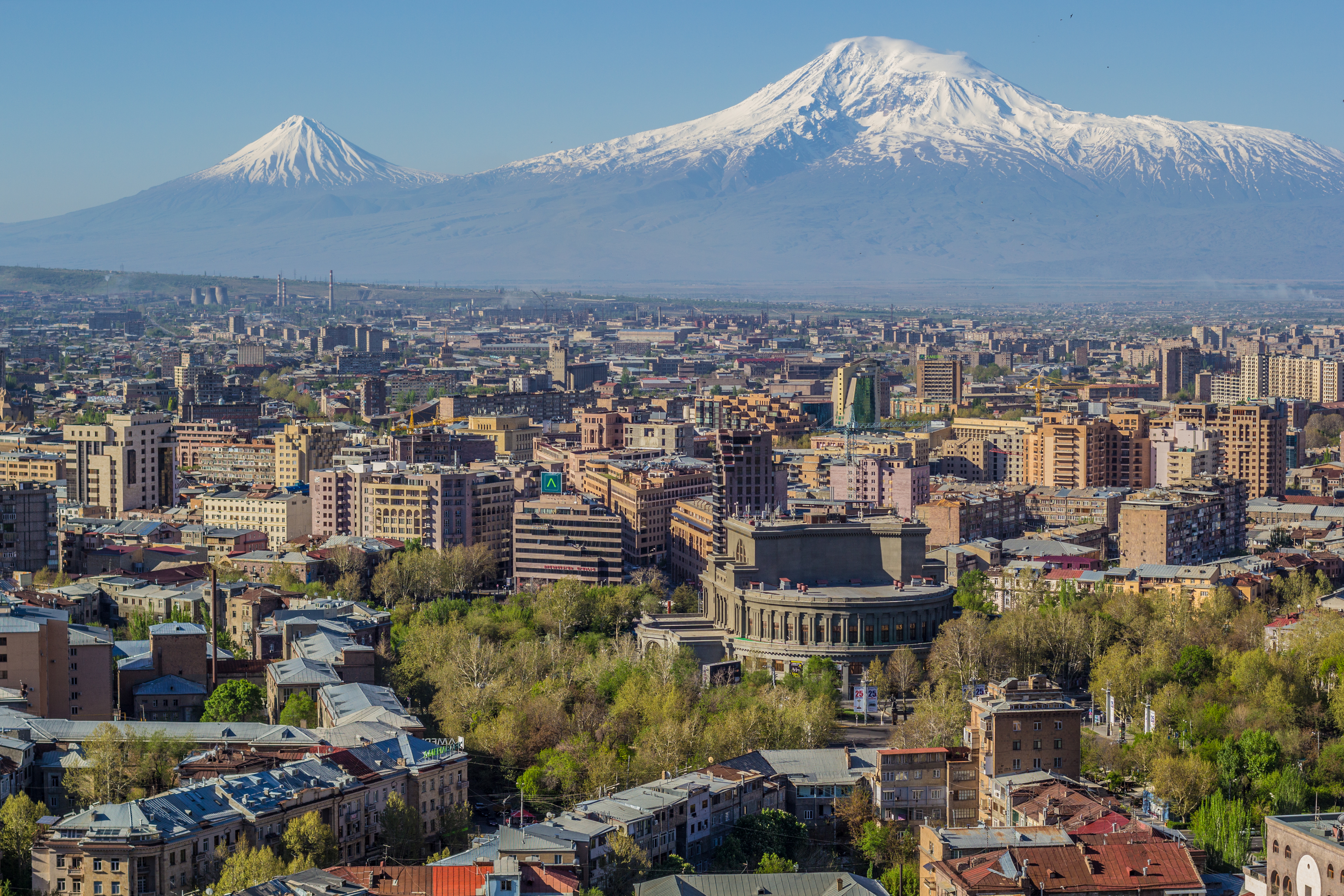
Mount Ararat, today located in Turkey, as seen from Armenia's capital Yerevan. It symbolizes Western Armenia in the Armenian public mind. (Note: "The lands of Western Armenia which Mt. Ararat represent..." "mount Ararat is the symbol of banal irredentism for the territories of Western Armenia""...Ararat, which is in the territory of modern Turkey but symbolizes the dream of all Armenians around the globe about the lands lost to the west of this biblical mountain.")

In the Armenian language, there are several names for the region. Today, the most common is Arevmtyan Hayastan (Արևմտյան Հայաստան) in Eastern Armenian (mostly spoken in Armenia, Russia, Georgia, Iran) and Arevmdean Hayasdan (Արեւմտեան Հայաստան) in Western Armenian (spoken in the Diaspora: US, France, Lebanon, Syria, Argentina, etc.). Archaic names (used before the 1920s) include Tačkahayastan (Տաճկահայաստան) in Eastern and Daǰkahayasdan in Western Armenian. Also used in the same period were T'urk'ahayastan (Թուրքահայաստան) or T'rk'ahayastan (Թրքահայաստան), both meaning Turkish Armenia.

In the Turkish language, the literal translation of Western Armenia is Batı Ermenistan. The region has been officially described as Eastern Anatolia (Doğu Anadolu) since the seven geographical regions of Turkey were defined at the 1941 First Geography Congress. Throughout much of recorded history the eastern boundary of Anatolia was not considered to extend as far as the Araxes, the river which marks the present day boundary between the states of Armenia and Iran. The name "Armenia" was forbidden to be used in official documents by Ottoman authorities in the 1880s, and the region was officially renamed "Eastern Anatolia" by the Turkish successor state in the 1920s. This has been characterized as an attempt by Turkey to erase the Armenian history of the region.

== History ==
=== Ottoman conquest ===
After the Ottoman-Persian War (1623–1639), Western Armenia became decisively part of the Ottoman Empire. After the Russo-Turkish War, 1828–1829, the term "Western Armenia" referred to the Armenian-populated historical regions of the Ottoman Empire that remained under Ottoman rule after the eastern part of Armenia was ceded to the Russian Empire by the Qajar Persians, following the Russo-Persian War (1804–1813) and Russo-Persian War (1826–1828).

=== World War I and later years ===
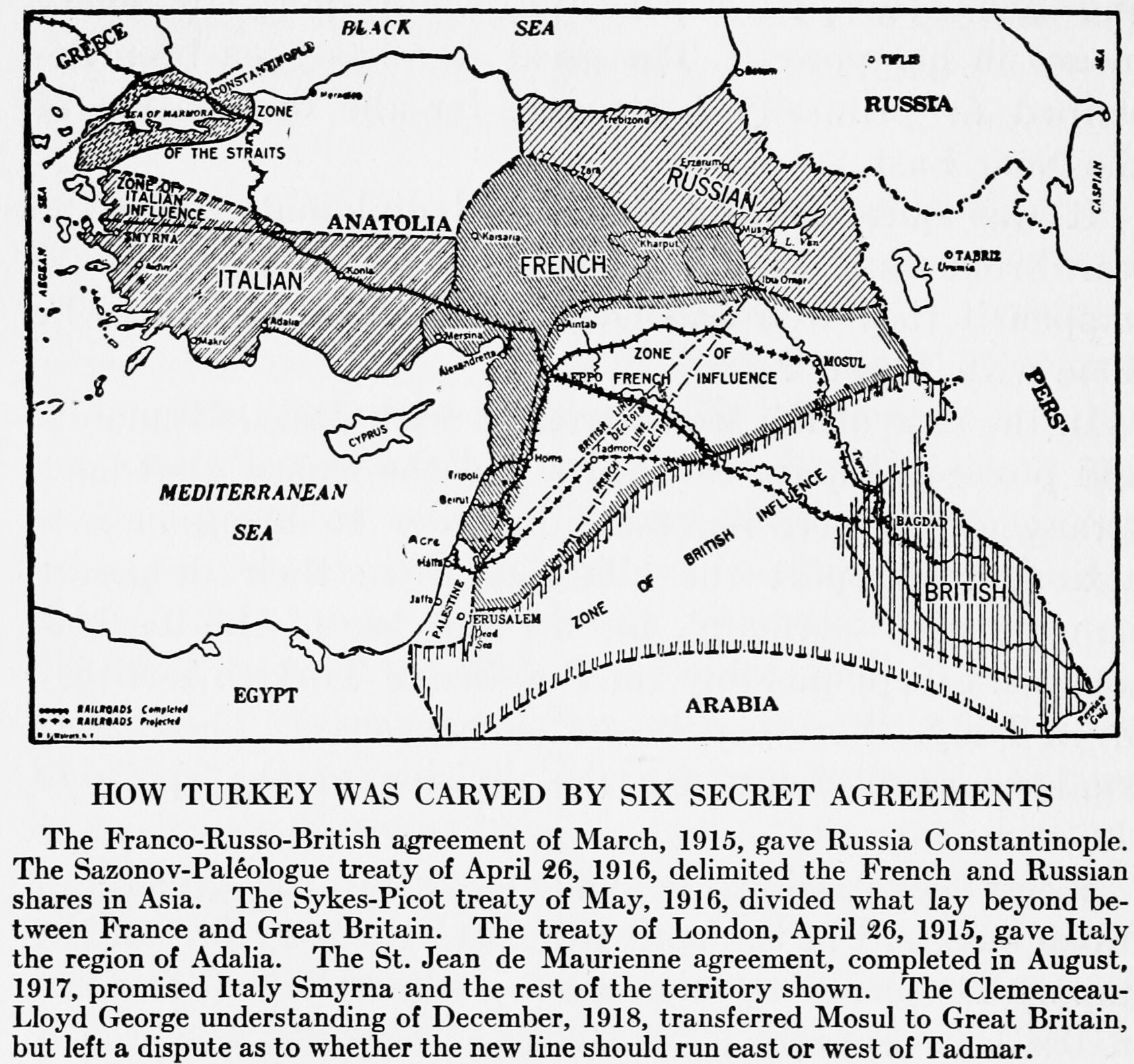
The treaties as summarized in 1923 by Ray Stannard Baker, who was Woodrow Wilson's press secretary during the Paris Peace Conference.

==== Armenian genocide ====
In 1894–1896 and 1915 the Ottoman Empire perpetrated systematic massacres and forced deportations of Armenians resulting in the Armenian genocide. The massive deportation and killings of Armenians began in the spring 1915. On 24 April 1915, Armenian intellectuals and community leaders were deported from Constantinople. Depending on the sources cited, about 1,500,000 Armenians were killed.

==== Caucasus campaign ====
During the Caucasus campaign of World War I, the Russian Empire occupied most of the Armenian-populated regions of the Ottoman Empire. A temporary provincial government was established in occupied areas between 1915 and 1918.

The chaos caused by the Russian Revolution of 1917 put a stop to all Russian military operations and Russian forces began to conduct withdrawals. The first and second congresses of Western Armenians took place in Yerevan in 1917 and 1919.

==== Sazonov–Paléologue Agreement ====
The Sazonov–Paléologue Agreement of 26 April 1916 between Russian Foreign minister Sergey Sazonov and French ambassador to Russia Maurice Paléologue proposed to give Western Armenia to Russia in return for Russian assent to the Sykes–Picot agreement.

== Area ==
Western Armenia comprises the Six Vilayets (vilâyat-ı sitte): Erzurum, Van, Bitlis, Diyarbekir, Kharput, and Sivas that existed during the Ottoman Empire. Alternatively, Western Armenia is referred to as the "12 lost provinces" in the Tsitsernakaberd complex which memorializes the Armenian genocide. These provinces correspond to the following:

1. Kars
2. Batum
3. Trebizond
4. Sivas
5. Kayseri
6. Adana
7. Haleb
8. Kharpert
9. Diyarbekir/Amed
10. Bitlis
11. Erzerum
12. Van

== Current situation ==
The fate of Western Armenia – commonly referred to as the "Armenian question" – is considered a key issue in the modern history of the Armenian people. Armenia currently does not have any territorial claims against Turkey, although one political party, the Armenian Revolutionary Federation, the largest Armenian party in the diaspora, claims the area designated as part of the Republic of Armenia (1918–1920) in the 1920 Treaty of Sèvres also known as Wilsonian Armenia. Since 2000, an organizing committee of the congress of heirs of Western Armenians who survived the Armenian genocide is active in diasporan communities.

A 2014 survey in Armenia asked what kind of demands should be made to Turkey. Some 80% agreed that Armenia should make territorial claims (30% said only territorial claims, while another 50% said territorial, moral, financial, and proprietary). Only 5.5% said no demands should be made. According to a 2012 survey, 36% of Armenians asked agree or somewhat agree that Turkish recognition of the Armenian Genocide will result in territorial compensation, while 45% believe it will not. The online publication Barometer.am wrote: "It appears that our pragmatic population believes that all possible demands should be forwarded to Turkey [...] but a relative majority consider the practical realization of territorial claims to Turkey is unrealistic."

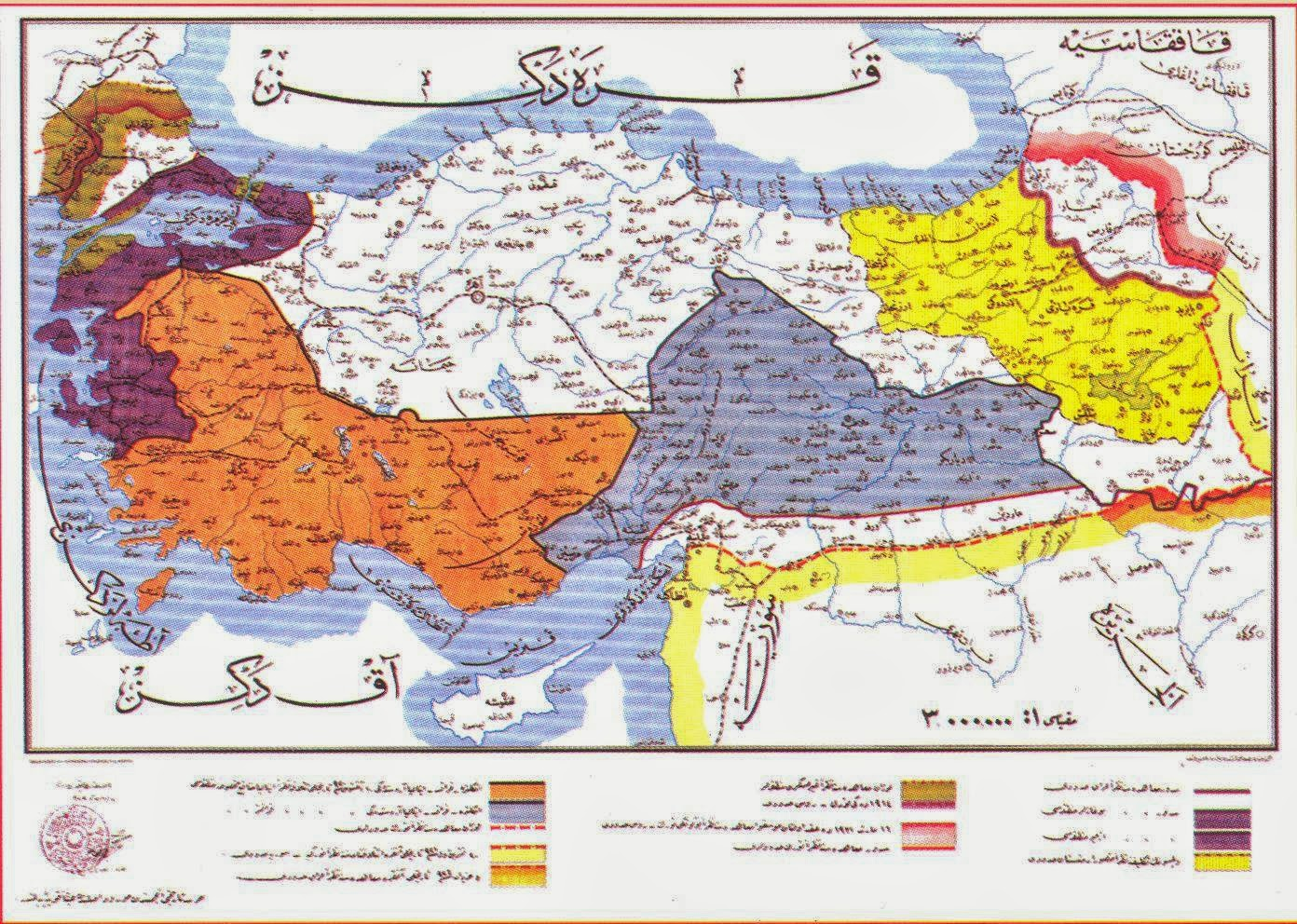
A 1927 version of the map used by the Grand National Assembly of Turkey (later restored)

== Gallery ==
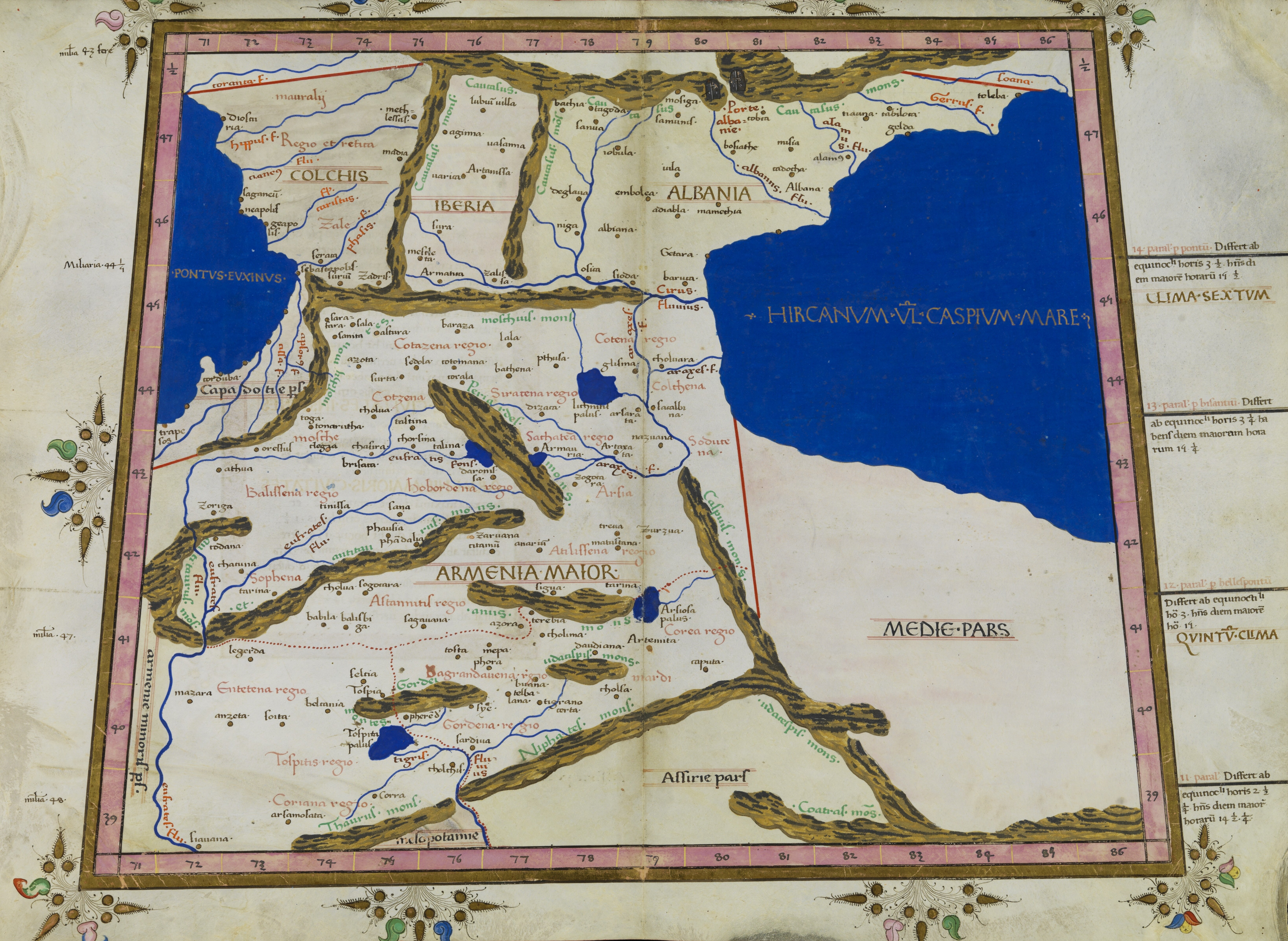

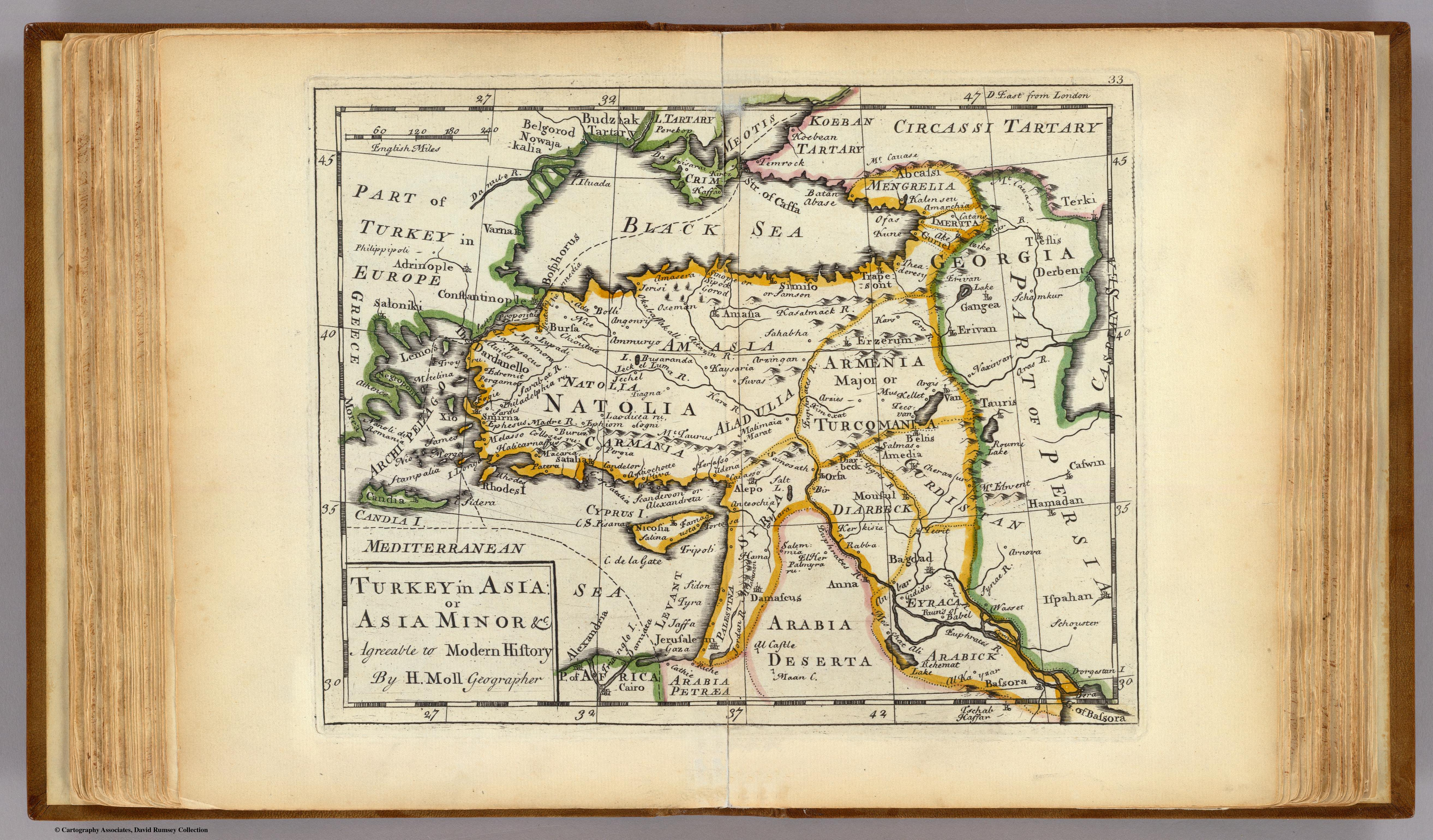
Western Armenia the first half of the 18th century. Herman Moll's map,1736.

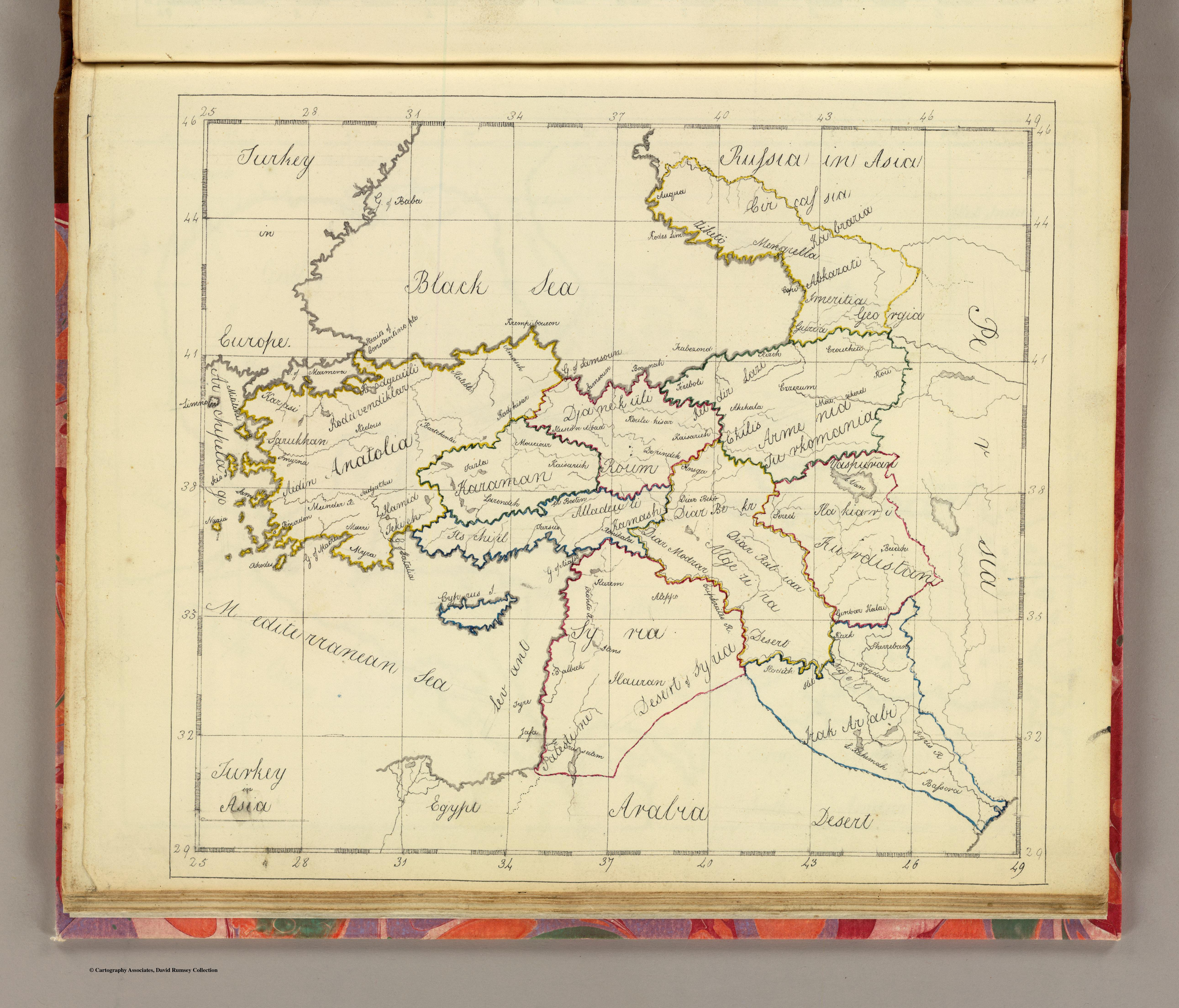
Armenia Turkomania on 1810 map.

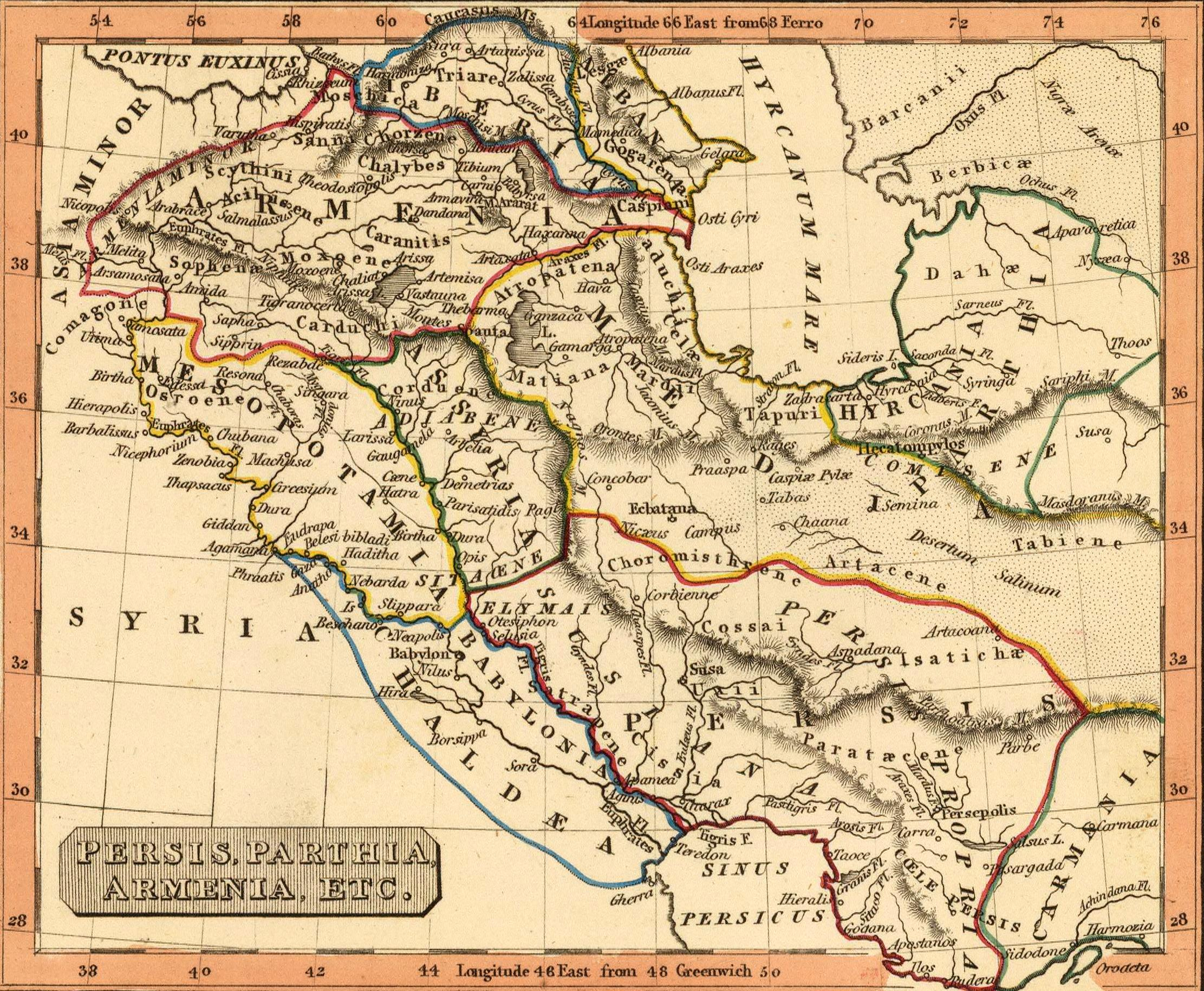
Persis, Parthia, Armenia. Rest Fenner, published in 1835.

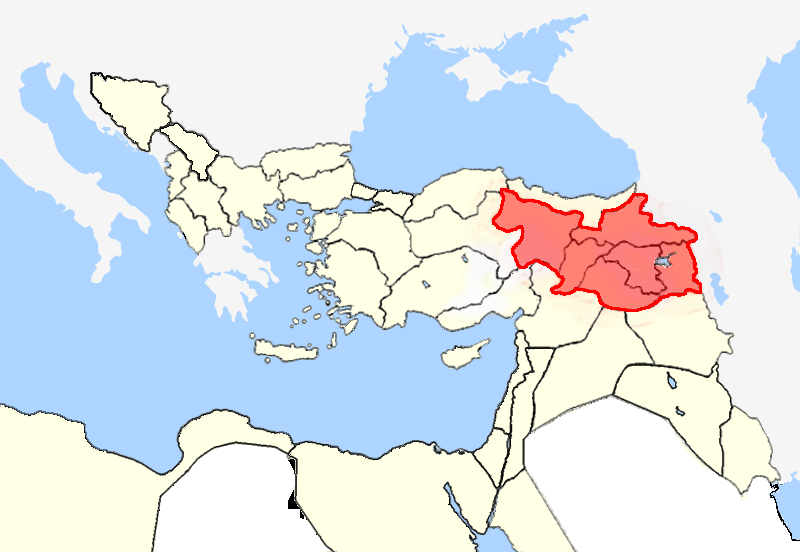
The Six Armenian vilayets (provinces) of the Ottoman Empire were defined as Western Armenia.

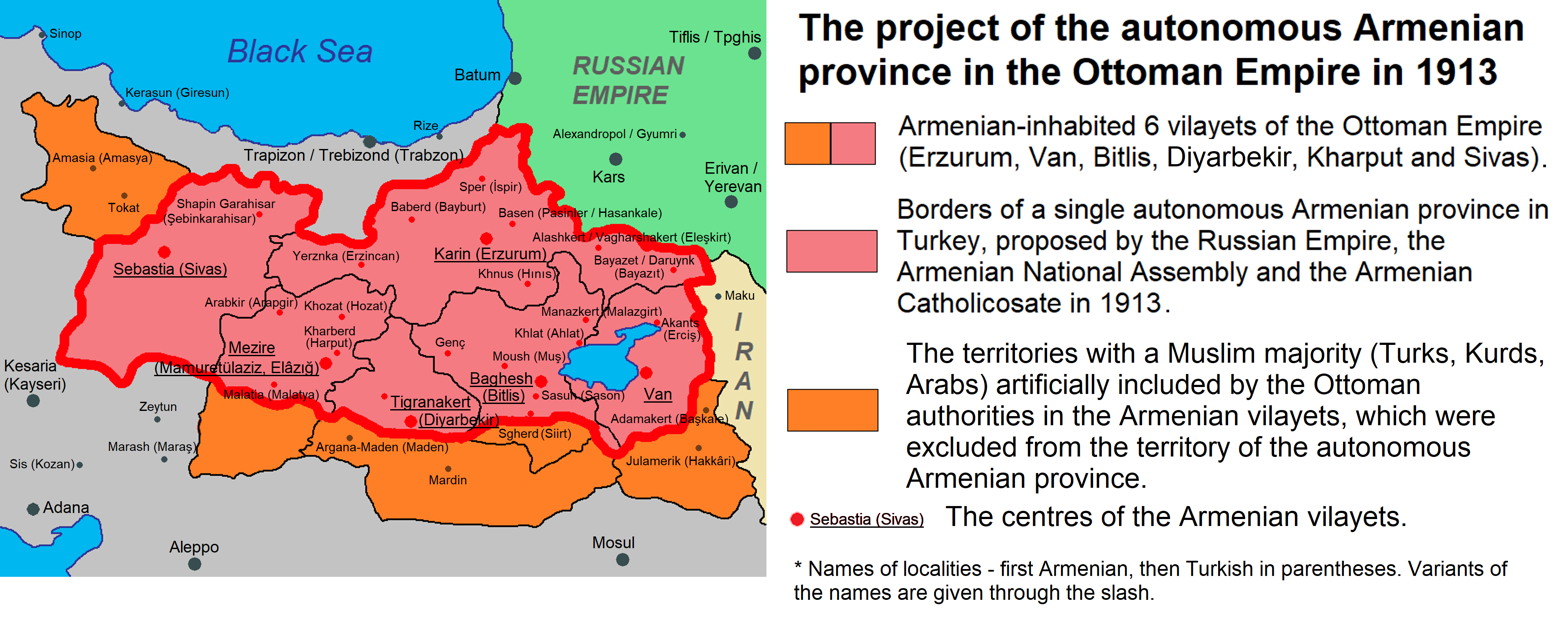
Autonomous Armenian province within the Ottoman Empire, proposed by the Russian Empire, the Armenian National Assembly and the Armenian Catholicosate in 1913.

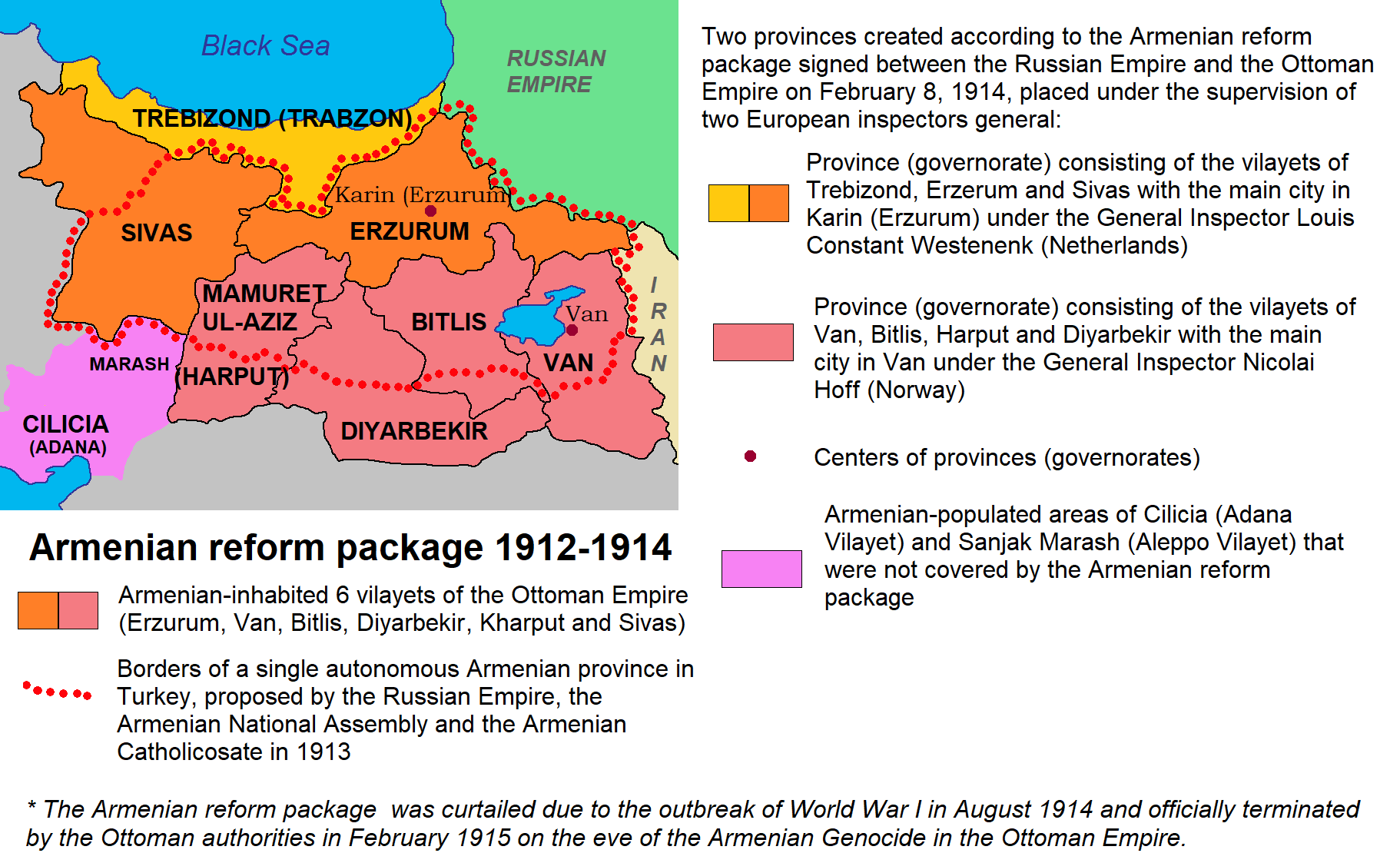
Armenian reform package in Ottoman Empire, finally signed by representatives of the Ottoman Empire and the Russian Empire on February 8, 1914, and providing for the creation of 2 provinces under the control of inspectors general appointed by the Great Powers.

Armenian genocide: map of massacre locations and deportation and extermination centers.

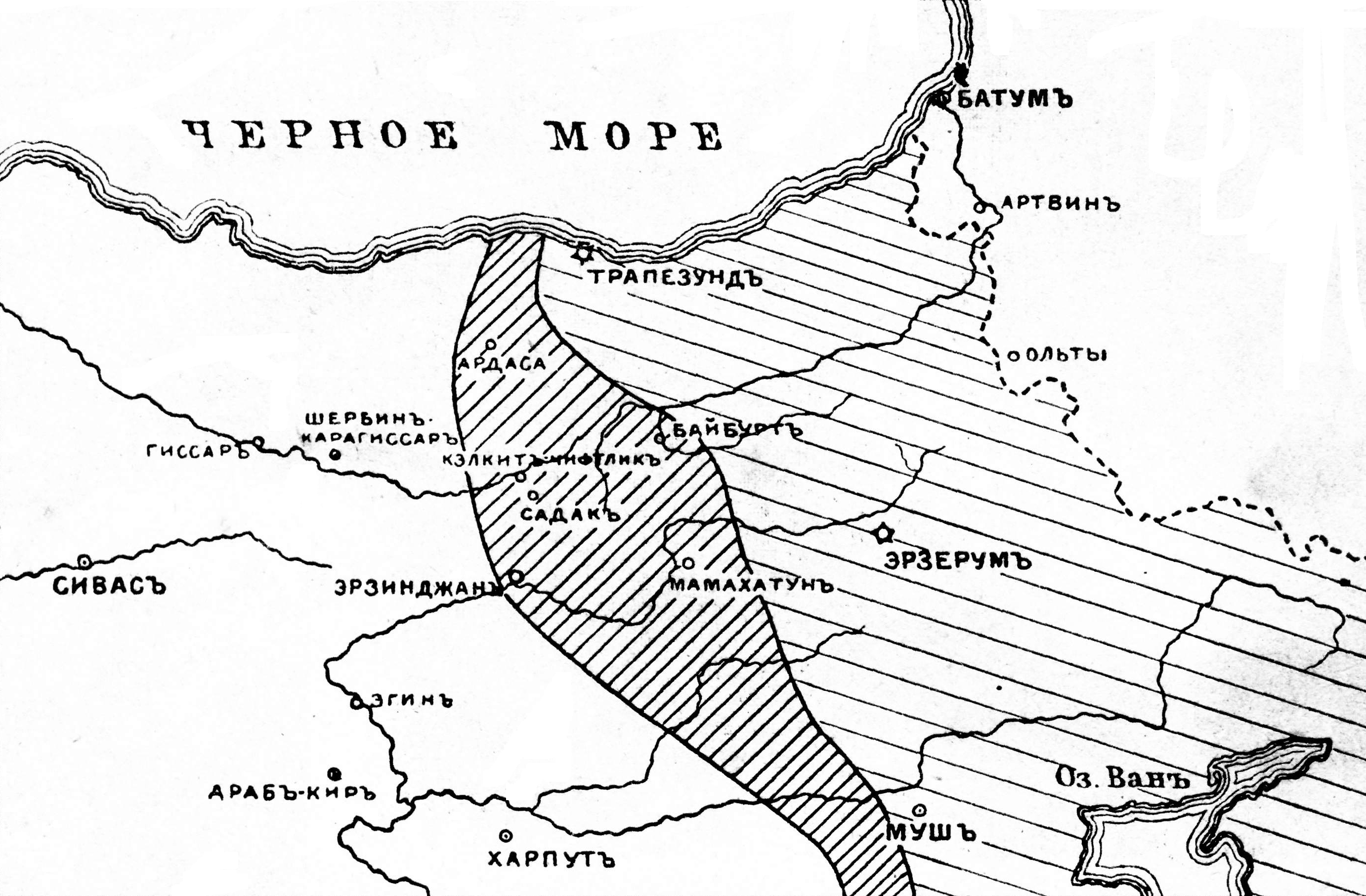
The area of Russian occupation of Western Armenia in summer 1916 (Russian map).

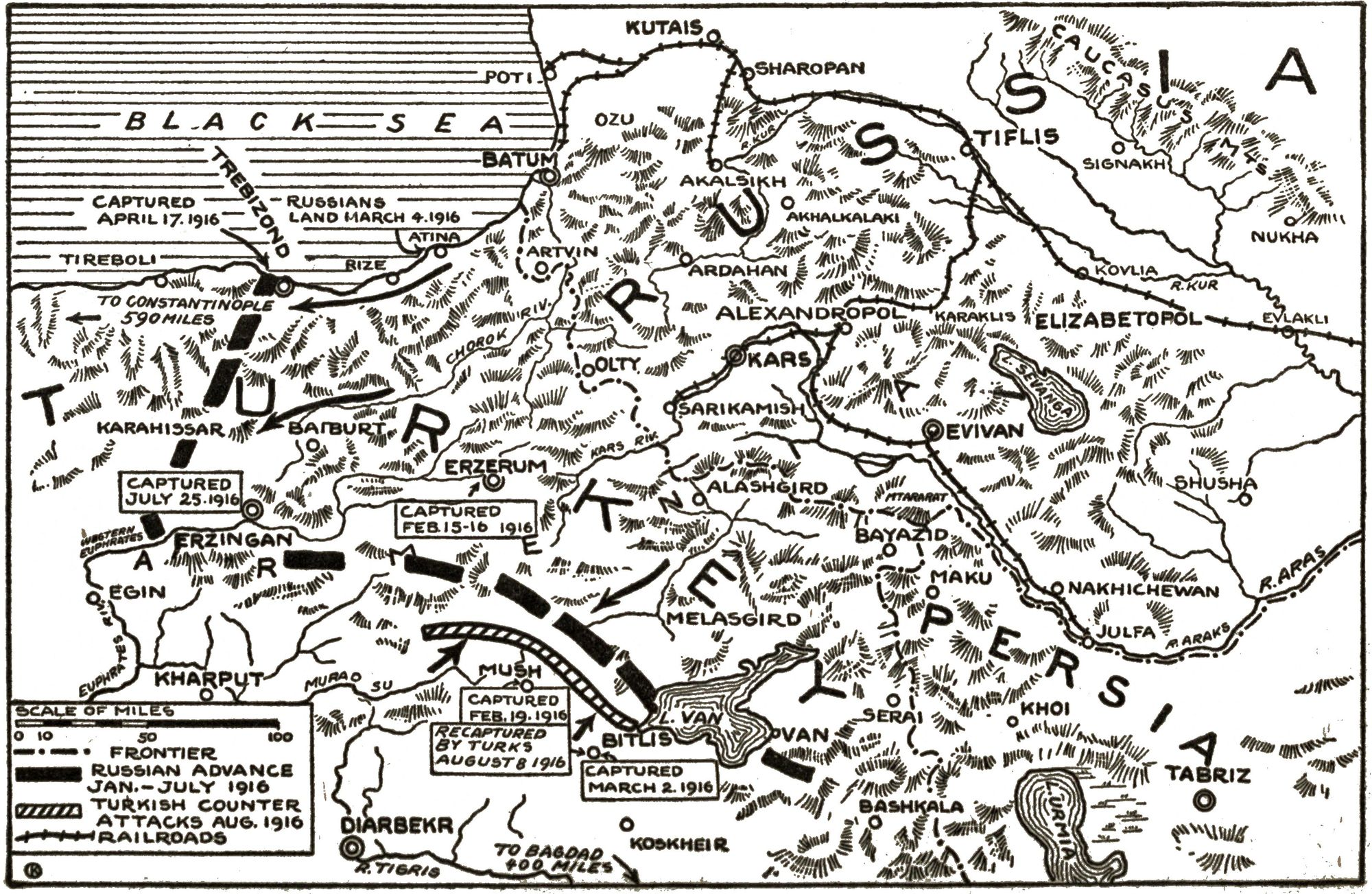
The area of Russian occupation of that region in summer 1916.

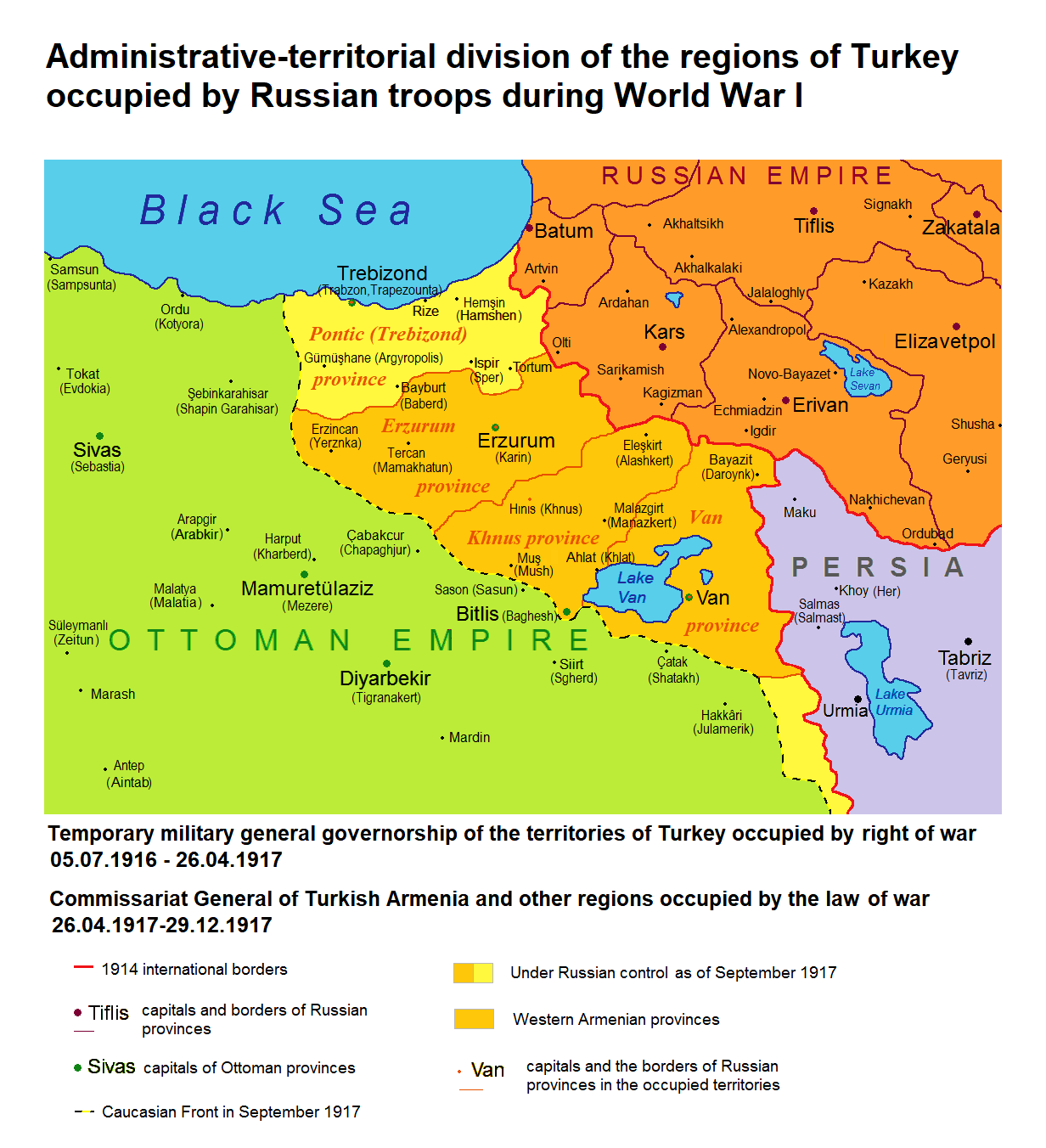
Administrative-territorial division of Western Armenia, occupied by Russian troops in 1915-1917 .

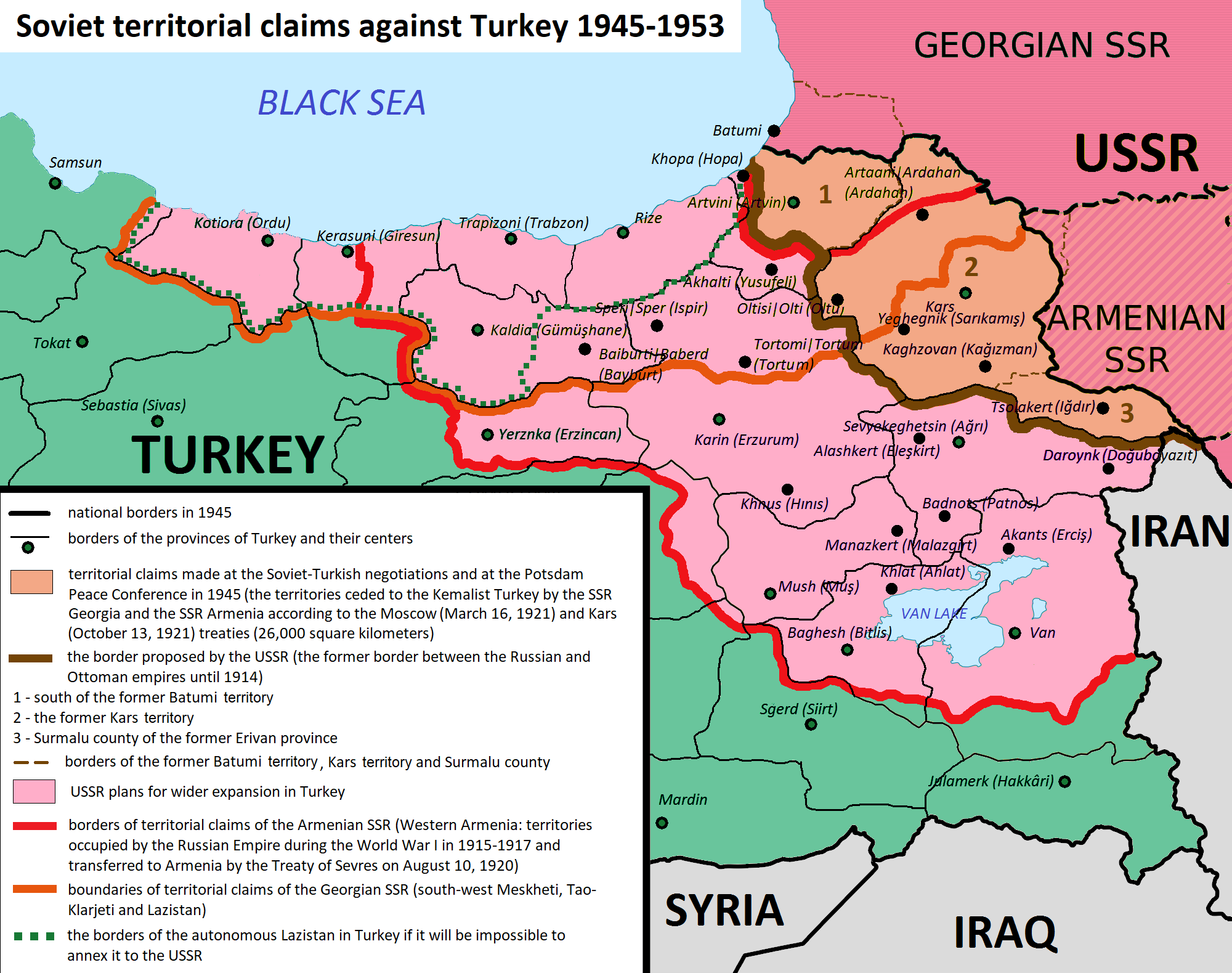
USSR (Armenian SSR and Georgian SSR) territorial claims against Turkey 1945–1953.

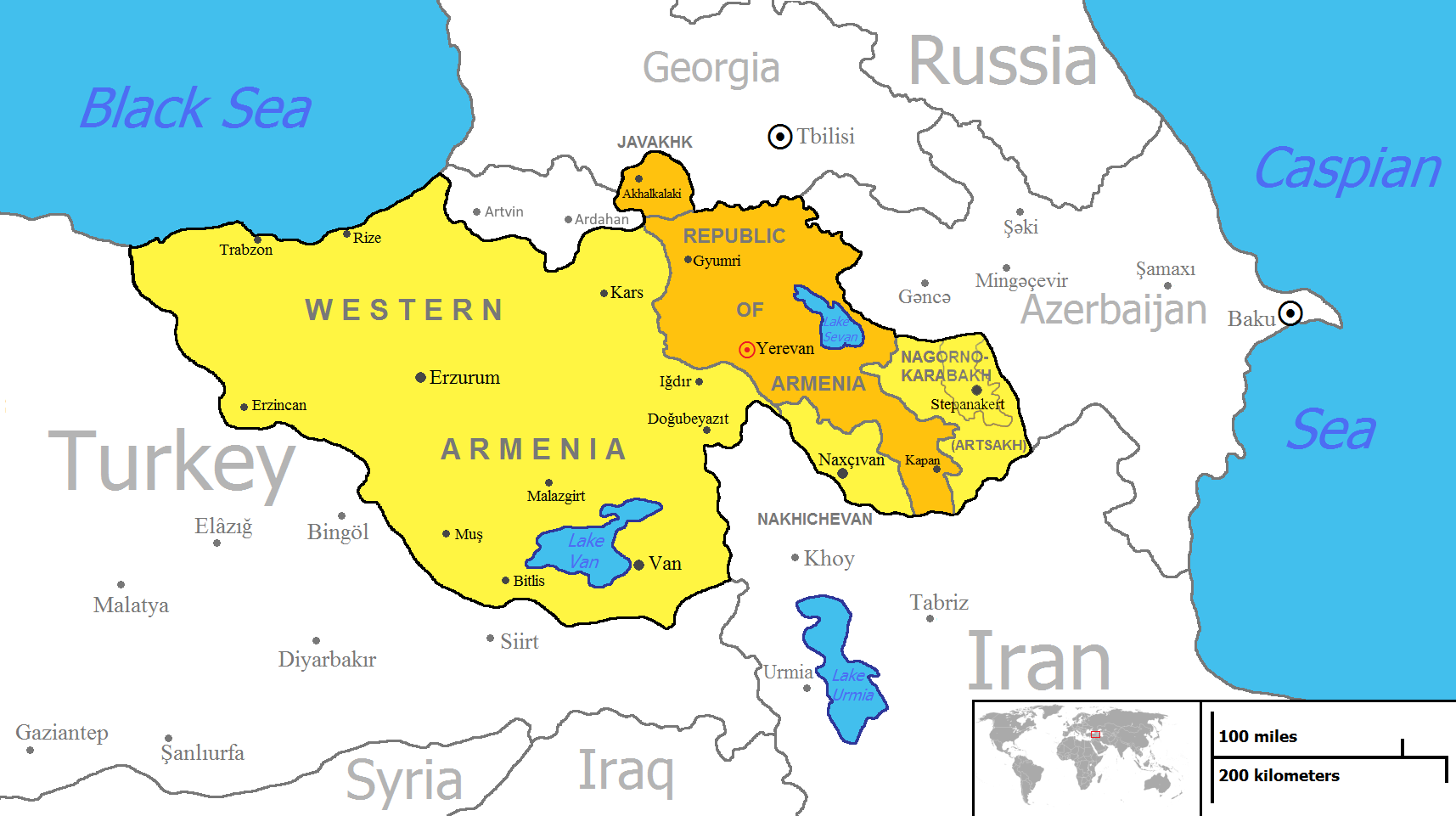
The modern concept of United Armenia as used by Woodrow Wilson and the Armenian Revolutionary Federation (Dashnaktsutyun).

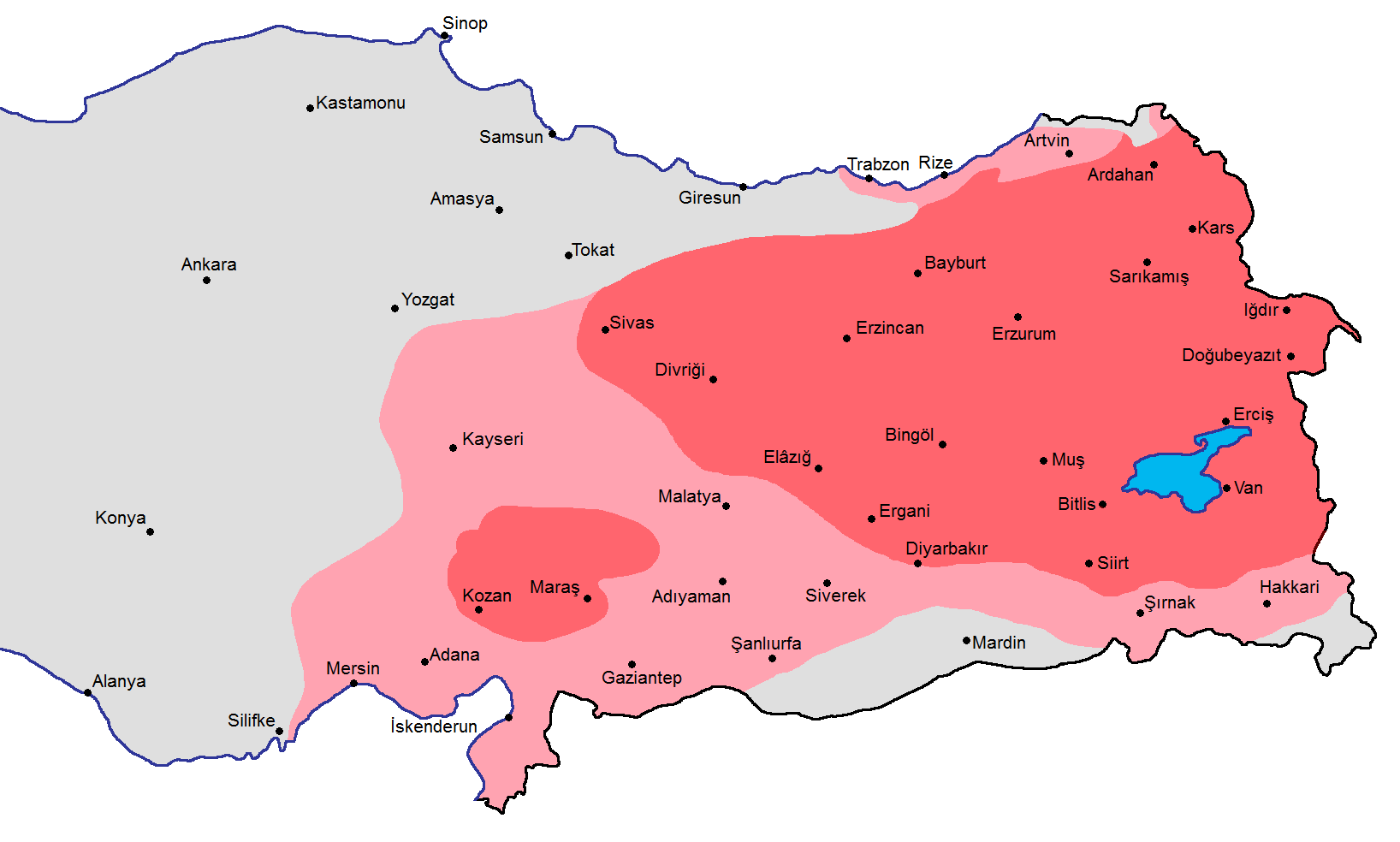
Early 1600s spread of Armenians, a few decades after Ottoman conquest, within modern Turkey, per the State Committee of the Real Estate Cadastre of Armenia

== See also ==
- Armenia–Turkey border
- Armenia without Armenians
- Armenian highlands
- Armenians in the Ottoman Empire
- Armenians in Turkey
- Geography of Armenia
- Hidden Armenians
- History of Armenia
- Occupation of Western Armenia
- Ottoman Armenian population
- Provinces of the kingdom of Armenia (antiquity)
- Sazonov–Paléologue Agreement
- Treaty of Lausanne
- Turkish–Armenian War
- Turkish Kurdistan
- United Armenia
- Wilsonian Armenia
