= 1895 Armenian reforms =

Never implemented Ottoman reforms

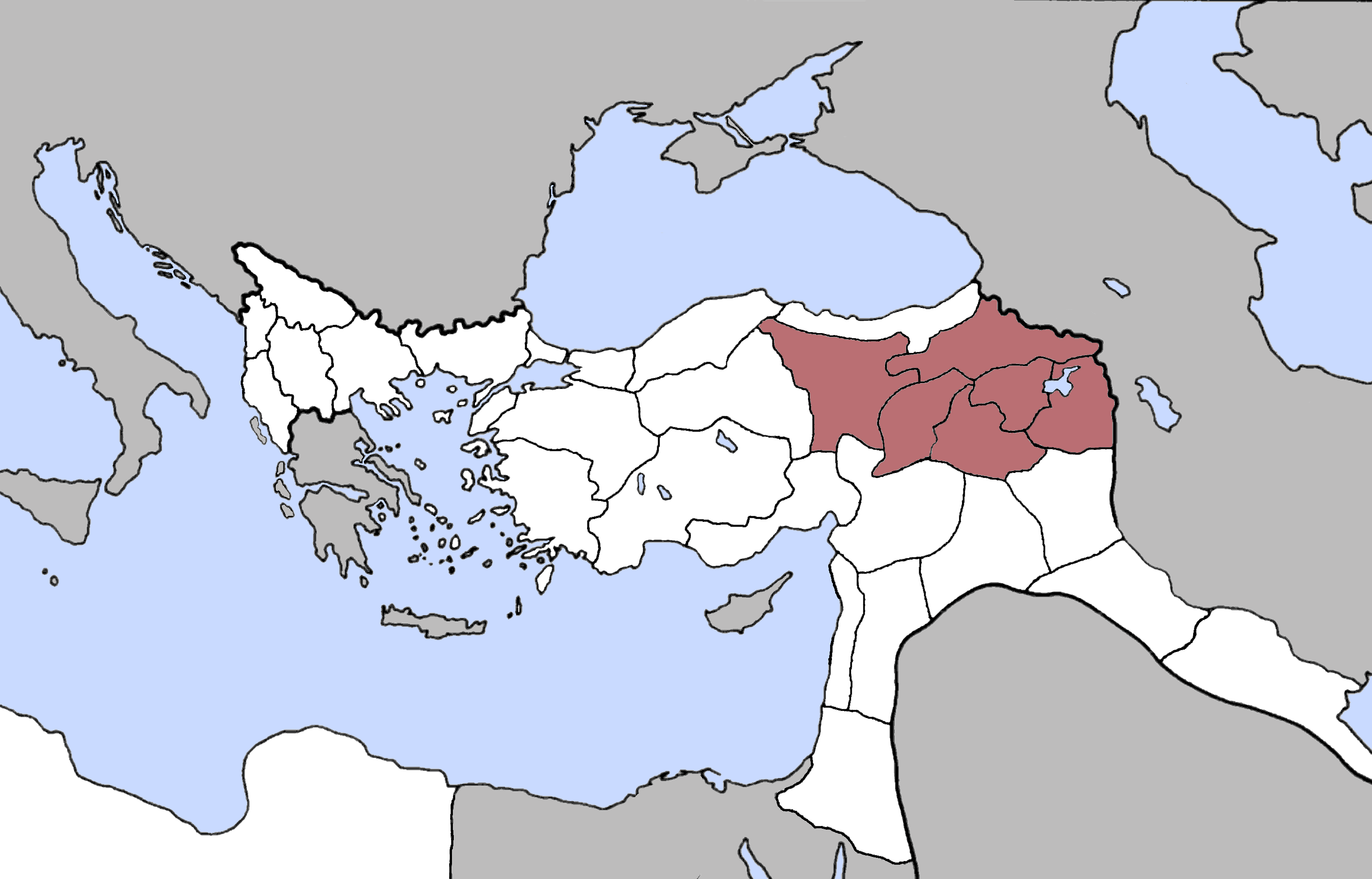
The six Armenian provinces at the end of the 19th century

The Armenian Reform Program of May 11, 1895, was a set of reforms proposed by the European Powers. The program was signed in October 1895 and presented to Sultan Abdul Hamid II. However, this program was never implemented.

== See also ==
- Armenian Question
- Armenian reform package

== Citations ==
- Hovannisian, Richard G. (1971). The Republic of Armenia: The first year, 1918–1919. Vol 1. Berkeley: University of California Press.
- Nalbandian, Louise (1963). The Armenian revolutionary movement; the development of Armenian political parties through the nineteenth century. Berkeley, University of California Press.
