= Armenia without Armenians =

Political phrase with multiple meanings

"Armenia without Armenians" is a phrase with different meanings.

== Armenian genocide ==
Map of massacre locations and deportation and extermination centers during the Armenian genocide

Some Armenian and non-Armenian scholars use the phrase in reference to the aftermath of the Armenian genocide of 1915, which left the Turkish-controlled parts of the Armenian homeland without significant Armenian population.

== Russian Empire ==
In the late 19th and early 20th centuries, several Russian officials proposed the policy of "Armenia without Armenians", most notably Aleksey Lobanov-Rostovsky, foreign minister in 1895–96.

During World War I, the Russian army occupied Western Armenia with the help of Armenian volunteer units. In 1916, the Russian government disbanded the Armenian volunteer units. General Nikolai Yudenich, who led the Russian army into the Armenian-populated areas of the Ottoman Empire during the Caucasian Campaign of World War I, proposed a plan of deporting the remaining Armenians from their ancestral homes. The Russian government seriously considered the possibility of repopulating the Armenian lands by Russian peasants and Cossacks.

== Emigration from Armenia ==
In the early 21st century, the phrase is often used to refer to emigration from Armenia. In 2009 the Russian government began a migration program, called "Compatriots", which encourages Armenians to settle in Russia. Sociologist Ruben Yeganyan, First Nagorno-Karabakh War veteran Sargis Hatspanyan, and political analyst Ruben Mehrabyan stated that the program leaves Armenia without Armenians. In 2013 Hatspanyan linked what he saw as Russia's policy of an "Armenia without Armenians" to the Armenian government's decision to join the Eurasian Economic Union and the possibility of a mass emigration to Russia.

== See also ==
- Judenfrei
