= Malcolm =

Malcolm, Malcom, Máel Coluim, or Maol Choluim may refer to:

== People ==
- Malcolm (given name), includes a list of people and fictional characters
- Malcom (footballer) (born 1997), Brazilian football forward
- Clan Malcolm
- Maol Choluim de Innerpeffray, 14th-century bishop-elect of Dunkeld

=== Nobility ===
- Máel Coluim, Earl of Atholl, Mormaer of Atholl between 1153/9 and the 1190s
- Máel Coluim, King of Strathclyde, 10th century
- Máel Coluim of Moray, Mormaer of Moray 1020–1029
- Máel Coluim (son of the king of the Cumbrians), possible King of Strathclyde or King of Alba around 1054
- Malcolm I of Scotland (died 954), King of Scots
- Malcolm II of Scotland, King of Scots from 1005 until his death
- Malcolm III of Scotland, King of Scots
- Malcolm IV of Scotland, King of Scots
- Máel Coluim, Earl of Angus, the fifth attested post 10th-century Mormaer of Angus
- Máel Coluim I, Earl of Fife, one of the more obscure Mormaers of Fife
- Maol Choluim I, Earl of Lennox, Mormaer
- Máel Coluim II, Earl of Fife, Mormaer
- Maol Choluim II, Earl of Lennox, Mormaer

=== Surname ===
- Alexander Malcolm (disambiguation), multiple people
- Andrew Malcolm (disambiguation), multiple people
- Arthur Malcolm (1934–2022), Australian Anglican bishop
- Aussie Malcolm (1940–2024), New Zealand politician
- Calixto Malcom (1947–2021), Panamanian basketball player
- Christian Malcolm (born 1979), English sprinter
- David Malcolm (disambiguation), multiple people
- Derek Malcolm (1932–2023), British film critic and historian
- Devon Malcolm (born 1963), English cricketer
- Donald G. Malcolm (1919–2007), American organizational theorist
- George Malcolm (disambiguation), multiple people
- Howard Malcom (1799–1879), American educator and Baptist minister
- Ian Malcolm (disambiguation), multiple people
- James Malcolm (disambiguation), multiple people
- Janet Malcolm (1934–2021), American writer and journalist
- Jeff Malcolm (born 1956), Australian boxer
- John Malcolm (disambiguation), multiple people
- Joyce Lee Malcolm (born 1941), American constitutional law professor
- Laura Malcolm (born 1991), English netball player
- Lavinia Malcolm (c.1847–1920), Scottish suffragist and politician
- Mary Malcolm (1918–2010), BBC television announcer
- Michael Malcolm (disambiguation), multiple people
- Noel Malcolm (born 1956), English writer, historian and journalist
- Norman Malcolm (1911–1990), American philosopher
- Norman Malcolm (journalist) (1872–1926), in South Australia and Western Australia
- Norman Malcolm (umpire) (born 1955), Jamaican cricket umpire
- Peter Malcolm (rugby league) (active 1988), Australian rugby league footballer
- Peter Malcolm (rugby union) (born 1994), American rugby union player
- Reginald George Malcolm, Canadian flying ace during World War I
- Robyn Malcolm (born 1965), New Zealand actress
- Ryan Malcolm (born 1979), Canadian singer
- Sally Malcolm (born 1969), British author and publisher
- Sharon Malcolm (1947–2019), American politician
- Tiara Malcom (born 1983), American basketball player

== Fiction ==
- Malcolm (Macbeth), Prince of Cumberland, a character in Shakespeare's Macbeth
- Ian Malcolm (character), a character from Michael Crichton's Jurassic Park series of books and films
- Malcolm Reynolds, the captain of the spaceship Serenity in Joss Whedon's TV series Firefly
- Malcolm Tucker, a character in Armando Iannucci's The Thick of It and In the Loop
- Malcolm, an evil court jester in the adventure game series The Legend of Kyrandia
- Malcolm, a fictional character in the Unreal Tournament game series
- Malcolm, a ship, where the story of Julio Cortázar's The Winners takes place
- "Malcolm", an episode of the Indian TV series Sacred Games

== Television and film ==
- Malcolm X (film), 1992 biographical film about the activist and Black nationalist Muslim Malcolm X
- Malcolm (film), a 1986 Australian comedy film about an amateur inventor
- Malcolm in the Middle, American television series
  - Malcolm (Malcolm in the Middle), the title character of the series
- Malcolm Merlyn (DC Comics), becomes Leader of the League of Assassins in the DC television show Arrow
- Malcolm & Eddie, American television situation comedy

== Literature ==
- The Autobiography of Malcolm X, 1965 book
- Letters to Malcolm, a collection of letters written by C. S. Lewis, posthumously published in 1964
- Malcolm (novel), 1959 comic novel by James Purdy
- Malcolm, a 1965 stage adaptation of Purdy's novel by Edward Albee

== Places ==
- Malcolm Hall, the main building of the University of the Philippines College of Law named after George A. Malcolm
- Malcom, Iowa, city in Poweshiek County
- Malcolm, Maryland, community in Charles County
- Malcolm, Nebraska, village in Lancaster County
- Malcolm Peak, a mountain in New Zealand
- Malcolm, Western Australia, an abandoned town in Western Australia

== See also ==
- Malcombe
