= Armenian National Delegation =

Diplomatic mission in Paris, 1912–1925

- Established: October 1912
- Founders: Georges V Soureniants
- Dissolved: January 1925
- Type: Diplomatic mission
- Location: Paris
- Director: Boghos Nubar Pacha (1912-1921); Gabriel Noradoungian (1921-1925)

The Armenian National Delegation is a diplomatic mission and an Armenian organization whose objective is to advocate for the claims of the Armenians of Western Armenia between 1912 and 1925. The organization was established by Georges V Soureniants and initially led by the businessman and diplomat Boghos Nubar Pasha until 1921.

Similarly to the Armenian delegation at the Congress of Berlin (1878), led by Archbishop Mkrtich Khrimian and sought to advocate for the Armenian cause before the major powers, the Armenian National Delegation aimed to resolve the Armenian question. Consequently, the Armenian National Delegation was involved in the settlement of the Armenian side of the First Balkan War, in the negotiation of the reform project in Ottoman Armenia from 1912 to 1914, and then in the settlement of World War I, particularly during the Paris Peace Conference of 1919.

In collaboration with the Delegation of the Republic of Armenia, it participated in the negotiations that led to the Treaty of Sèvres (1920), which recognized Armenia as a free and independent state. However, with the Sovietization of independent Armenia at the end of 1920 and then the victory of the Kemalists during the Turkish War of Independence (1919–1922), the Treaty of Sèvres was revised and replaced by the Treaty of Lausanne (1923), which dashed Armenian hopes. The Armenian National Delegation then assumed responsibility for the care of Armenian refugees before disappearing in early 1925.

== History ==
=== Genesis (1912) ===
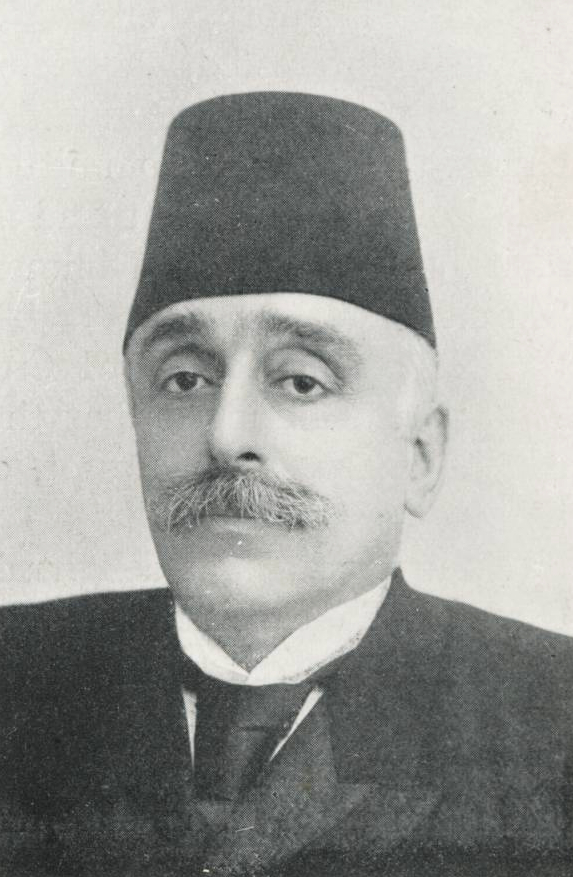
Portrait of Boghos Nubar Pacha.

During the First Balkan War, which commenced in October 1912, the Russian Empire's diplomatic efforts led to a renewed focus on the Armenian question. Subsequently, Catholicos Georges V Soureniants was empowered to petition Emperor Nicholas II to protect Ottoman Armenians. As historian Anahide Ter Minassian observes, this development fostered a sense of optimism among Armenian organizations, which initiated the collection, publication, and dissemination of statistical and documentary evidence to bolster the case for Russian diplomatic action.

In November 1912, Georges V Soureniants concluded a diplomatic agreement, known as a "kontak", which established the Armenian National Delegation in Paris. The Catholicos enjoyed the support of the Viceroy of the Caucasus, Illarion Vorontsov-Dashkov, and the National Bureau, which represented the Armenians of Russia and was established in 1912. He appointed businessman and diplomat Boghos Nubar Pacha as the head of the delegation. Among its members were other prominent figures of the Parisian Armenian community, such as the writer Archag Chobanian and the former Ottoman minister Gabriel Noradounghian, who became a member after his exile to France in November 1918. Aram Andonian served as its secretary between 1919 and 1923.

This delegation, established during the First Balkan War to represent the interests of Ottoman Armenians, was dispatched to Paris to advocate for the Armenian cause before the six powers that had signed the Treaty of Berlin in 1878. This was in accordance with the Armenian delegation's efforts at the Berlin Congress, led by Archbishop Mkrtich Khrimian. In early December 1912, Boghos Nubar Pasha arrived in Paris. This was at a time when the Ottoman Empire had requested an armistice (December 3). While the Political Council of the Armenian National Assembly was responsible for managing the issue from the Ottoman and Russian sides, the National Delegation was tasked with external diplomatic action, particularly about the major European powers.

Upon his arrival in Paris, Boghos Nubar promptly sought an audience with the Ottoman ambassador to propose a consensus among the Russians, English, Germans, and French on the reforms to be implemented in Ottoman Armenia.

=== London Conference (September 1912 – May 1913) ===
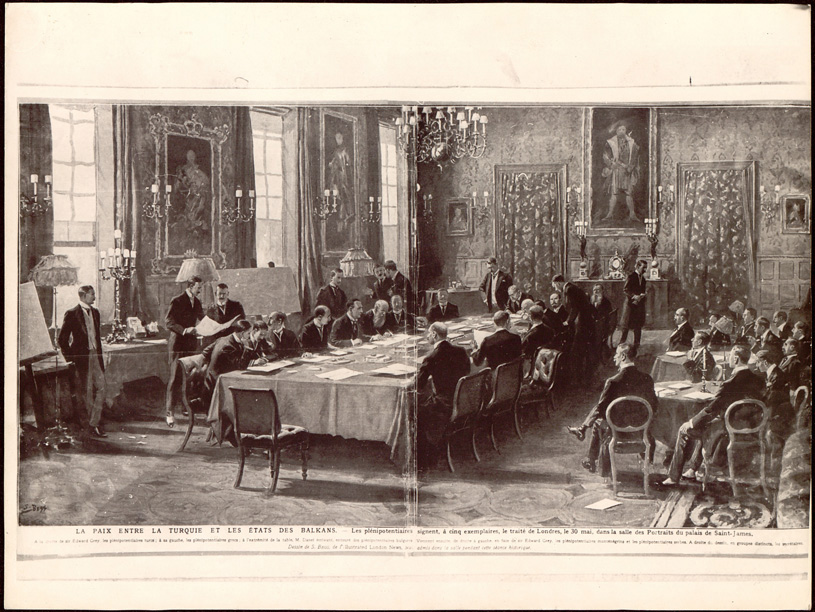
Signature of the Treaty of London on May 30, 1913.

Subsequently, Boghos Nubar made regular journeys from Paris to Berlin, Geneva, and London. In this city, his contacts with high-ranking English dignitaries were relayed by the influential British Armenia Committee (in which Lord Bryce sat), which sought to have reforms in Ottoman Armenia discussed at the London Conference convened to negotiate peace between the Balkan states and the Ottoman Empire following the Ottoman defeat, resulting in the Treaty of London in May 1913. On several occasions, he visited Edward Grey, head of the Foreign Office.

In this context, which also witnessed the ascendance of the Young Turks to power, Boghos Nubar Pasha, a figure more conservative than the Armenian Revolutionary Federation (ARF), called for reforms within the Ottoman Empire under the stipulations outlined in the Treaty of Berlin (particularly Article 61). However, he did not advocate for Armenian autonomy or independence from the Empire. He maintained contact with the ARF, notably with Vahan Papazian, an influential figure in the Armenian institutions of Constantinople, who visited him in Paris in February 1913 to clarify the key points of the reforms to be implemented. They agreed on a common project for the representatives of the great powers, which included the appointment of European inspectors and guarantees from European states.

At that time, the National Delegation distributed a memorandum that outlined the potential benefits of implementing reforms in Western Armenia. The memorandum, produced by the institutions of the Armenian National Assembly, suggested that such reforms could contribute to regional stability and peace. It was then forwarded to André Mandelstam, a diplomat attached to the Russian Embassy in Constantinople, and subsequently brought to the attention of Russian diplomatic circles. The memorandum presented several proposals for consideration:

- Unification of the six vilayets;
- Appointment of a governor (Christian, Ottoman, or European), as well as an Administrative Council and a mixed Islamic-Christian provincial assembly;
- Formation of a mixed gendarmerie led by European officers to protect the Armenians;
- Dissolution of the Hamidiye regiments;
- Legalization of the use of Armenian and Kurdish in local administration;
- Authorization for minorities to establish and administer schools with special taxes previously reserved for Turkish schools;
- Formation of a commission to examine land confiscations;
- The expulsion of Muslim immigrants settled on Armenian lands;
- Implementation of these measures in Cilicia;
- Oversight by European powers, who were to ensure the application of these measures.

France, the United Kingdom, Russia, and Germany from January 1913 were engaged in diplomatic negotiations. The parties involved had disparate interests in the region, further complicating matters. France and the United Kingdom pursued a status quo diplomacy to preserve their interests, opposing a Russian annexation of eastern Anatolia. However, Germany opposed any reform, as it would jeopardize its economic dominance over the Ottoman Empire. Additionally, its Young Turk allies urged it to thwart this "Russian project."

During the Conference, France and the United Kingdom sought to moderate Russian ambitions and denounced Germany's position, accusing it of interference in Ottoman Empire affairs. For Russia, the absence of reforms in the Armenian provinces of the Ottoman Empire would inevitably result in a further intensification of the prevailing disorder. It was therefore argued that the only viable solution to the problem would be a Russian military intervention. In the end, the powers concurred that reforms were necessary, provided that their implementation was left to the discretion of the Ottoman government. The Russians denounced this condition, which they believed would not allow for the concrete implementation of any reforms. Boghos Nubar, however, insisted on the essential nature of control of the reforms by the great powers. The United Kingdom and Germany refused this control to be Russian, which did not particularly bother the head of the Armenian National Delegation, who also feared Russian control over Anatolian Armenia.

The European powers concluded the Conference without further ado and charged their respective ambassadors in Constantinople, at Russia's behest, with the responsibility of continuing the negotiations.

=== Between the London Conference and the Great War (1913–1914) ===
In mid-1913, Nicholas II amassed troops in the Caucasus, at the border with the Ottoman Empire, and sought to intensify pressure by ordering his agents to incite Kurdish provocations in Western Armenia.

As historian Raymond Kévorkian observes, Boghos Nubar Pasha persisted in traveling during the Conference and particularly in the months that followed, with the objective of "attempting to influence the stances of various parties, relying on pro-Armenian national committees", such as the British Armenia Committee or the Armenian Committee of Berlin. He was thus supported by some pro-Armenian British Members of Parliament in the House of Commons, yet he encountered difficulty in persuading British diplomats of the merits of the reform project. He was disconcerted by the passive stance of the United Kingdom, which starkly contrasted with that of the Ottoman officials, particularly Grand Vizier Mahmoud Shevket Pacha, who expressed support for the proposed reforms. Boghos Nubar also engaged with Italian political figures, such as Deputy Galli, who made a public statement in June 1913 in the Italian Parliament in favor of reforms in Ottoman Armenia.

In June 1913, European diplomats resumed negotiations in the Ottoman capital, utilizing the Armenian memorandum as the foundation for their discussions. The Armenian National Delegation, continuing its diplomatic work in Europe, underscored to diplomats that the Armenians were not pursuing autonomy but rather the establishment of an administration that would guarantee their security. In his discussions with British financial circles, Boghos Nubar sought to persuade them that the proposed reforms would guarantee the security of their loans in the Ottoman Empire. Similarly, in his conversations with the German government, he endeavored, in collaboration with the Armenian Committee of Berlin, to illustrate that implementing reforms would be the most effective means of preventing a Russian invasion of the Ottoman Empire.

In the context of the economic crisis that impacted the Ottoman Empire, Boghos Nubar Pasha put forth a proposal linking the provision of European material aid to the implementation of reforms. However, this proposal was not given due consideration by the major powers. At that time, only Russia demonstrated a genuine interest in the Armenian question. In late June or early July, Boghos Nubar met with Mehmet Cavit Bey. In a subsequent statement published in the Armenian newspaper Azadamard, the Ottoman government indicated its willingness to implement reforms and asserted that it had reached an agreement with Boghos Nubar Pasha on the majority of points, except for the issue of guarantees, following a meeting in Paris. Nevertheless, this official stance was largely driven by the Ottoman government's necessity to obtain a French financial loan to resume hostilities against Bulgaria. The visit of Boghos Nubar, a prominent figure in French political circles, appeared to be part of this strategic maneuver.

In the summer of 1913, the Ottoman government published a counter-proposal, suggesting the establishment of general inspectors in Eastern Anatolia to address problems. However, German ambassador Hans von Wangenheim effectively blocked negotiations between European diplomats. Consequently, Boghos Nubar proceeded to Berlin in early August, where he convened with German Foreign Minister Gottlieb von Jagow to persuade him to terminate his obstructionist policy. This "decisive" meeting facilitated the resolution of the impasse, particularly in Constantinople. Johannes Lepsius, a Protestant theologian who played a pivotal role in the negotiations by acting as an intermediary between the Armenian Patriarchate of Constantinople and the German embassy, conveyed to Boghos Nubar via telegram that "the situation [was] favorable" and extended an invitation to him to visit the Ottoman capital. Boghos Nubar declined the invitation, citing the responsibility of the Political Council, appointed by the Armenian National Assembly, to conduct negotiations within the Ottoman Empire.

In late September 1913, European diplomats reached an agreement whereby the eastern provinces of the Ottoman Empire would be grouped into two territorial entities, each administered by an inspector. On October 17, 1913, Boghos Nubar Pasha conveyed to Russian Foreign Minister Sergey Sazonov his satisfaction with this compromise. By this date, the issue was essentially resolved; the remaining objective was to persuade the Ottoman authorities to endorse the agreement.

An international conference on Armenian reforms was convened in Paris on November 30 and October 1, 1913, by the Armenian National Delegation to finalize the project's remaining points. Representatives of Armenian committees and pro-Armenian organizations, as well as German, Russian, British, and Italian diplomats, attended the conference.

On December 25, 1913, the finalized reform project was presented to the Ottoman authorities by Russian and German diplomats. The reform project in Ottoman Armenia was finally signed on February 8, 1914. It still included the clause establishing Western oversight, a clause previously rejected by the Ottomans. The responsibility of selecting the two general inspectors was assigned to Boghos Nubar Pasha and his Delegation. In April 1914, the Dutchman Louis Constant Westenenk and the Norwegian Nicolai Hoff were appointed to the position. However, this legislation was subsequently suspended following the Ottoman Empire's entry into World War I.

=== World War I (1914–1918) ===
As the Armenian population of the Ottoman Empire was subjected to mass killings during the Armenian Genocide, the Armenian National Delegation, and thus primarily Boghos Nubar Pasha, negotiated the Franco-Armenian Agreement of 1916. One of the key figures in the formation of the Armenian Legion (initially known as the Legion of the Orient) was Boghos Nubar, who sought to secure compensation for the Armenians after the war. This included the promise of an autonomous Armenian Cilicia under French protection. Nubar, who served as a crucial link between the French government and the Armenian recruitment committee for legionnaires, saw the Legion of the Orient as a foundation for the future Armenian army.

Following the declaration of independence of the Democratic Republic of Armenia (May 1918) and the conclusion of hostilities, the Armenian National Delegation proclaimed the independence of Integral Armenia and formally notified the Allied powers in a note dated November 30, 1918. In this document, the delegation declared that "the independence of Integral Armenia shall be under the aegis of the Allied Powers and the United States, or the League of Nations as soon as it is formed."

=== Paris Peace Conference (January - August 1919) ===
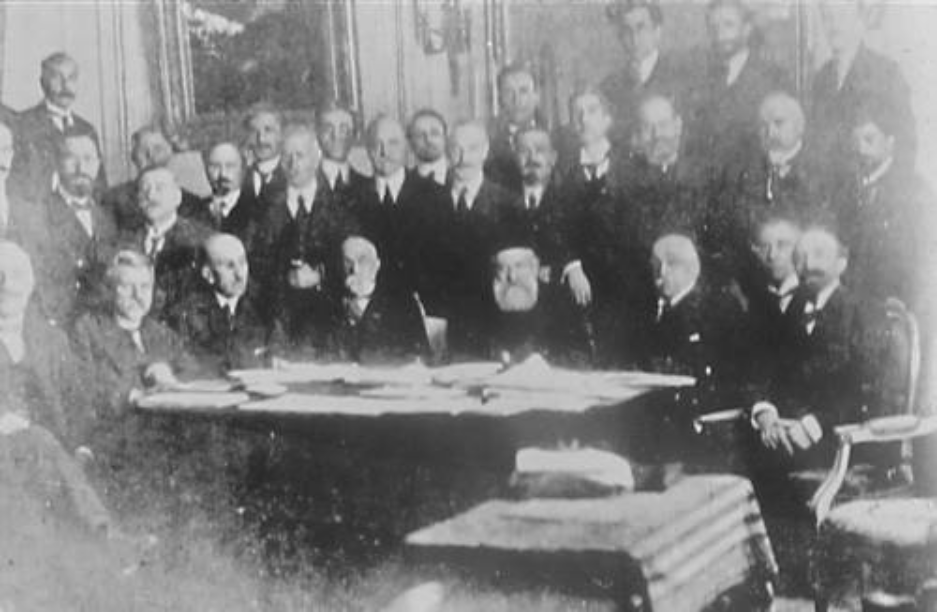
Boghos Nubar Pacha with other Armenian personalities at the Armenian National Congress.

In the aftermath of the war, the Armenian National Delegation participated in the Paris Peace Conference of 1919. Among the delegation's agents was the author Zabel Yesayan, who was appointed inspector by the delegation for the duration of the conference. As a refugee in the Caucasus between 1916 and 1918, she engaged in the significant task of collecting testimonies from refugees of the Armenian Genocide. She proceeded from Tehran to Paris in late 1918, where she delivered to the Armenian delegates a substantial body of documentation on the crimes committed by the Ottoman Empire.

The Delegation was present at the conference in conjunction with the delegation sent by the Democratic Republic of Armenia. They were, for the most part, in direct competition with one another, and the presence of this delegation, led by Avetis Aharonian, who did not possess the influence of Boghos Nubar, irritated the latter.

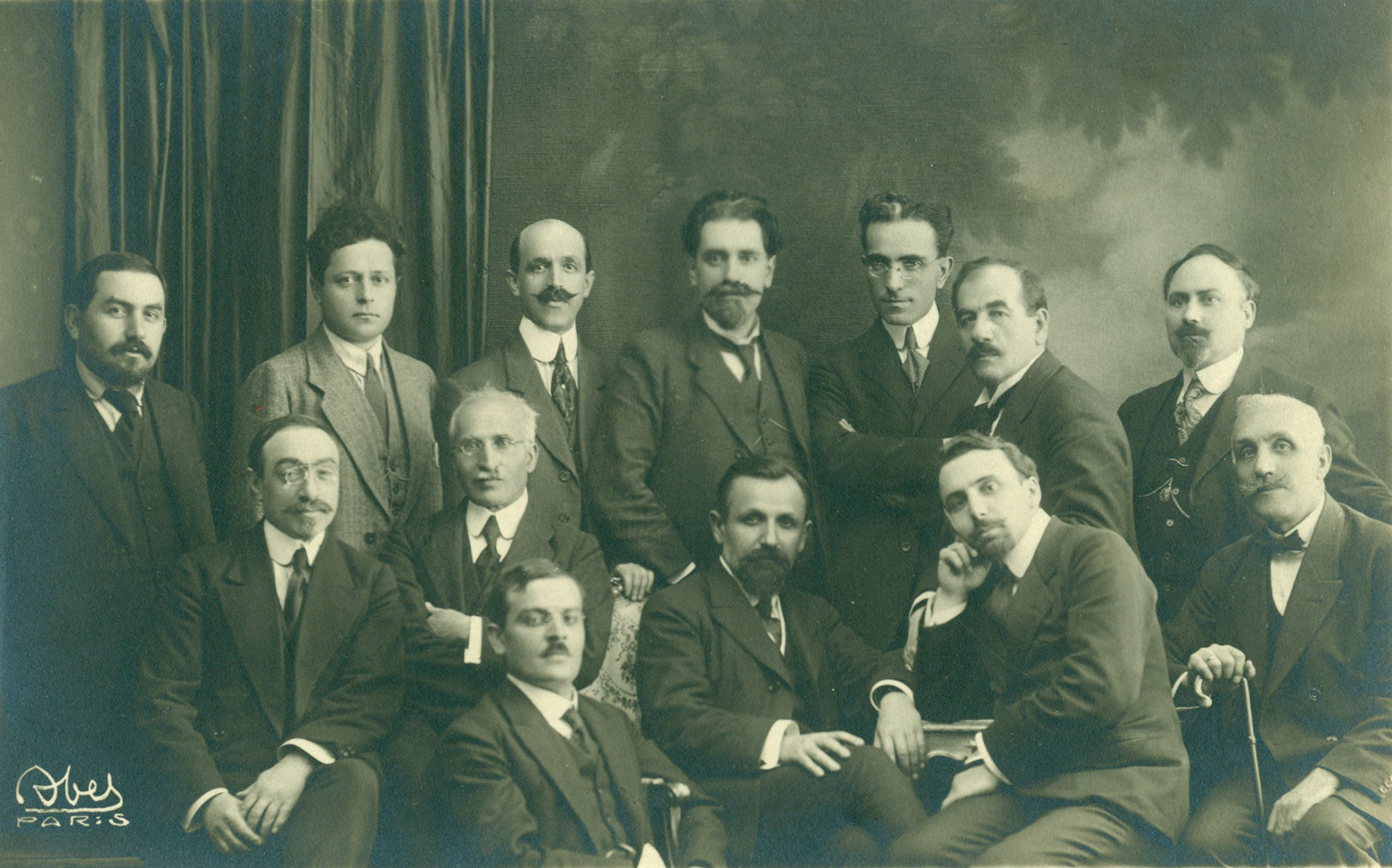
The Delegation of the Republic of Armenia, headed by Avetis Aharonian.

The vision of Armenia presented at the conference by Boghos Nubar was characterized by a notable degree of ambition, as evidenced by the map included herewith. According to him, the Republic of Armenia was only an "Araratian Armenia" (i.e., Eastern Armenia, at the foot of Mount Ararat) destined to be integrated into a much larger territory extending from the Caucasus in the east to Cilicia in the west. This vision caused concern among French diplomats, as it challenged the Sykes-Picot agreements. Conversely, while Avetis Aharonian had been tasked by his government to claim only a territorial extension of Armenia in the Caucasus, he eventually aligned himself with Boghos Nubar's more ambitious claims, which included the annexation of the six vilayets and the establishment of a corridor to the Black Sea via Trebizond.

Consequently, the two delegations convened on February 12, 1919, to establish a Delegation of Integral Armenia. However, they maintained their autonomy within the newly formed entity. Together, they drafted the Memorandum on the Armenian Question, which was to be presented at the peace conference. In it, the Armenians requested a large territory and the payment of reparations by Turkey. The Council of Ten agreed to listen to the Delegation, which presented the Memorandum on February 26, 1919. However, despite this, the Armenians could not secure a seat at the negotiating table.

In the latter half of February and the following weeks, the Armenian delegations continued to provide a plethora of documents to the diplomats present, which were, for the majority, well received by the Americans but received a more reserved reception from the French. This conception of Armenia was a source of great enthusiasm for the Armenians themselves, except for a few members of the Armenian government, such as Rouben Ter Minassian or Hovhannes Katchaznouni, who feared that it would serve to further fuel Turkish nationalism.

The Armenian National Congress convened in Paris between February 24 and April 22, 1919. On April 2, 1919, a new Armenian National Delegation was elected, with Boghos Nubar Pasha continuing to chair the body. The "neutral" tendency was represented by Abraham Ter Hagopian, while the Congress also included two Ramgavars, namely Archag Tchobanian and Vahan Tekeyan, as well as two Dashnaks (FRA), namely Armen Garo and Hagop Nevrouz. The Congress charged the Delegation to establish a unified Armenia.

As a symbol of the union between the two delegations, their two leaders co-signed an article titled "The Armenian Cause" in the journal La Paix des peuples on March 10, 1919. In the article, they explained that it would be a denial of justice if "The former territories of Turkish Armenia must be kept intact, along with those of Russian Armenia, regardless of any pretext or form of separation that may arise. Such a move would be tantamount to dismembering a living body and would inevitably lead to a perpetuation of persecution, oppression, and bloodshed."

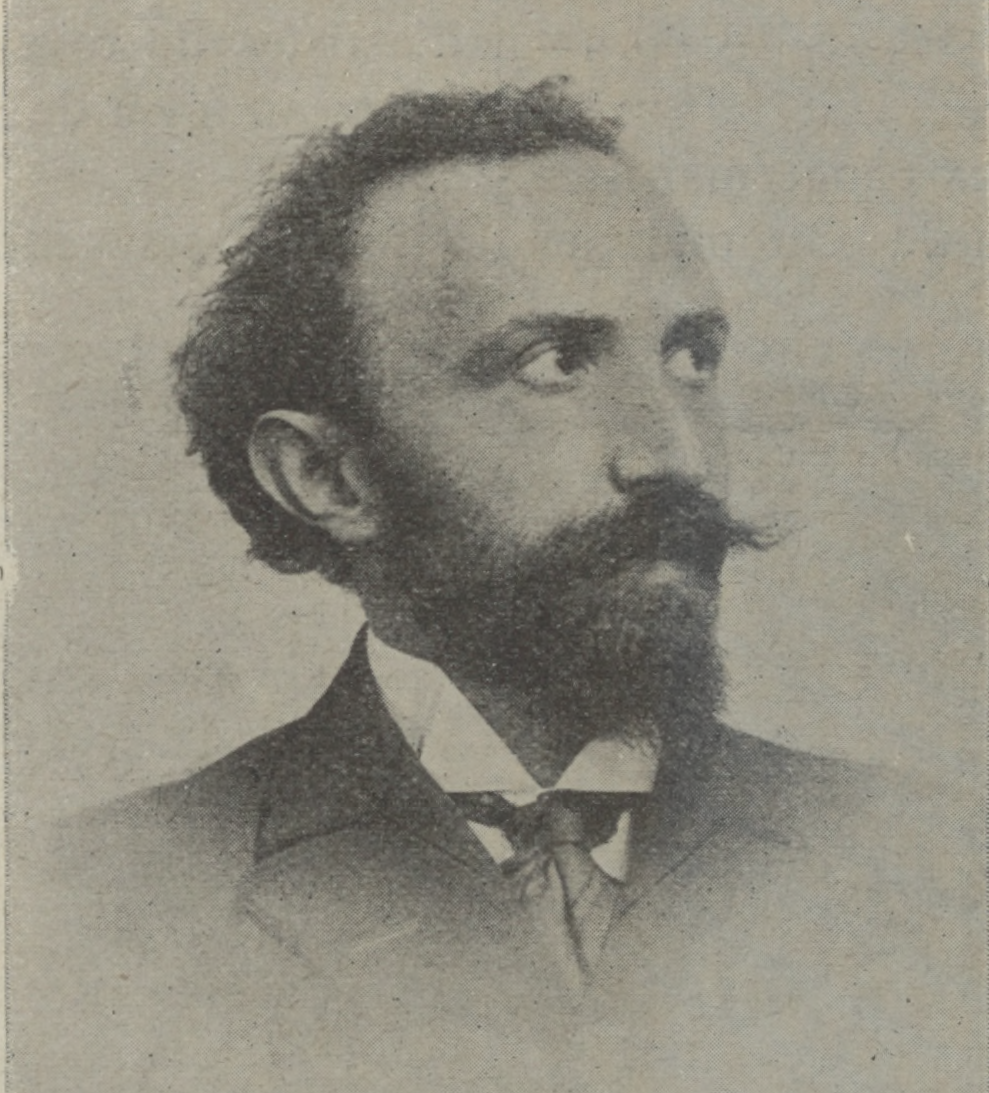
Archag Chobanian.

On May 28, 1919, the Armenian state adopted an Act of Unified Armenia, which notably promised the participation of Ottoman Armenians in the government of Armenia. The Act was promulgated on the anniversary date of the founding of the Armenian Republic, and both are celebrated by Armenians in Armenia and the diaspora. The particularly splendid celebration also took place in Paris, attended by both delegations and European Armenian and pro-Armenian intellectuals. As Anahide Ter Minassian observes, A. Aharonian lauded Armenian unity in lyrical terms, whereas Boghos Nubar Pasha, in more measured terms, evoked the birth of the "new and indivisible Armenian nation."

Moreover, the two delegations collaborated in organizing a Franco-Armenian banquet on July 17, 1919, intending to commemorate the Allied victory in the war. In attendance were Deputies Denys Cochin and Charles Guernier, as well as Paul Fleurot, Gustave Schlumberger, Auguste Gauvain, Alfred Vallette, Camille Mauclair, Gabriel Mourey, Henri Coulon, Ludovic de Contenson, Gaston Deschamps, Abbot Delarue, Frédéric Macler, Paul Desfeuilles, Émile Pignot, and others. At this assembly, each of the following individuals delivered a speech: Archag Tchobanian, Boghos Nubar Pasha, and Avetis Aharonian.

Despite their differences of opinion, the Armenian National Delegation and the Delegation of the Armenian Republic ultimately pursue the same goals: international recognition of the Armenian Republic, the acquisition of a mandate over Armenia, and the repatriation of refugees. However, after the peace conference in August 1919, a peace treaty with the Ottoman Empire was not signed, and the various issues concerning the Armenians remained unresolved.

From late 1919 until the spring of 1920, Boghos Nubar Pasha and his Delegation undertook a mission to negotiate with the First Republic of Armenia and its Prime Minister Alexander Khatissian the formation of a unity government with the representatives of Ottoman Armenians. However, these negotiations were unsuccessful.

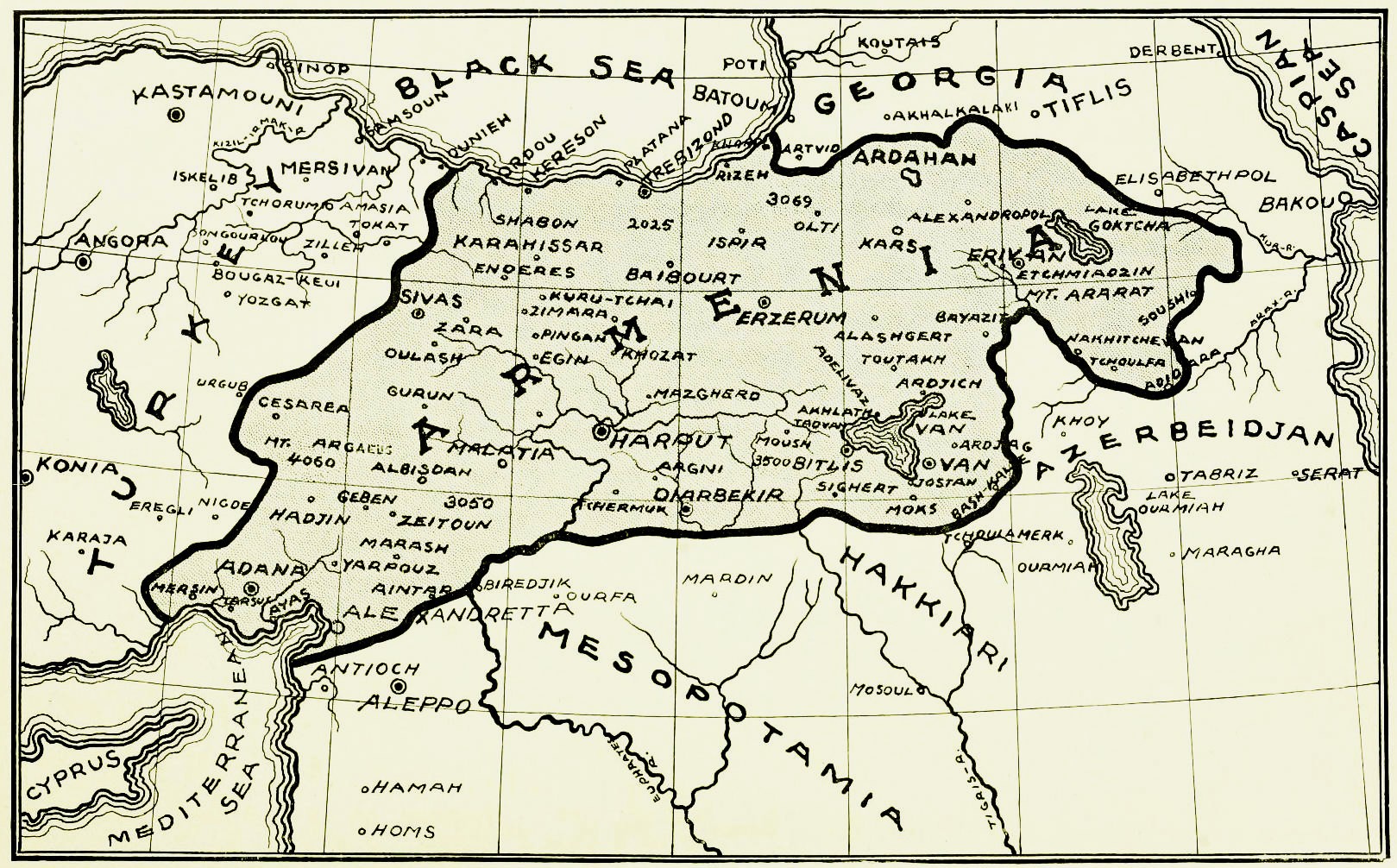
Map presented by the Armenian National Delegation at the Paris Conference of 1919.

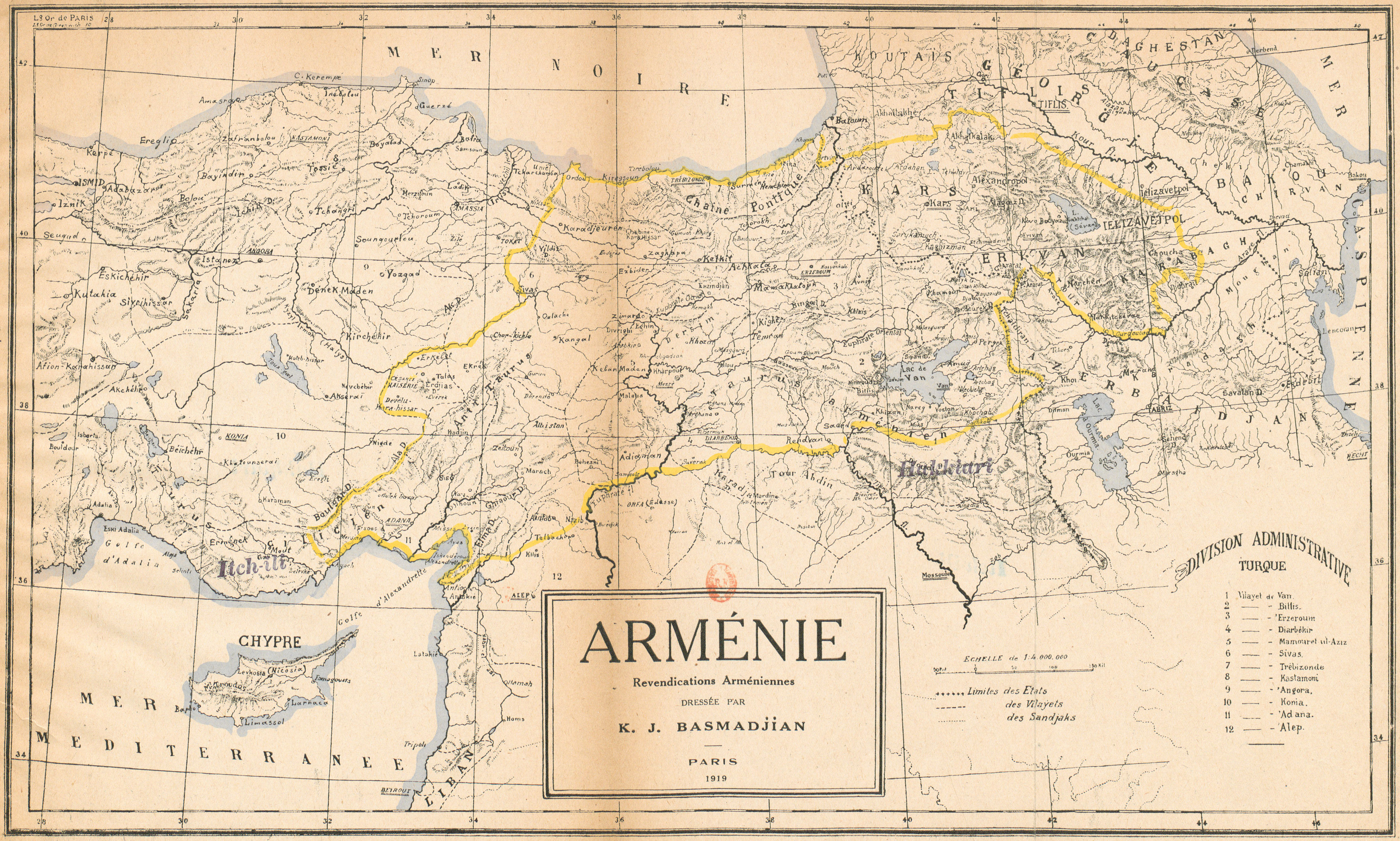
Other map version.

=== Treaty of Sèvres (August 10, 1920) ===
The Ottoman Empire after the Treaty of Sèvres.

The Treaty of Sèvres was concluded on August 10, 1920. Armenia, represented by the delegation led by Avetis Aharonian, was present at the negotiating table and among the signatories. The treaty partially satisfies the Armenian delegation, as it obligates the Ottoman Empire to recognize Armenia as a free and independent state (Article 88) and to submit the question of the border between the Ottoman Empire and Armenia in the vilayets of Erzurum, Trebizond, Van, and Bitlis to the President of the United States for resolution (Article 89). However, the Treaty of Sèvres does not mention Cilicia. Additionally, Boghos Nubar Pasha and the Armenian National Delegation are present, and the former jointly signed a protocol with Avetis Aharonian, which guarantees the freedoms, notably cultural and religious, of minorities in Armenia.

Despite being signed by the Ottoman government, Mustafa Kemal rejected the Treaty of Sèvres, and the Kemalist forces emerged victorious against the Armenian forces during the Turkish–Armenian War (September to December 1920). The Armenian Republic ceased to exist with the Sovietization of Armenia on November 29, 1920. In response, Boghos Nubar Pasha sought to establish an Armenian national home in the Cilicia region through the French mandate, a venture that only endured from 1920 to 1921. It ultimately succumbed to the French defeat at the hands of the Kemalist forces during the Cilicia campaign.

=== London Conferences (February - March 1921) ===
The London Conference is convened in part to address the Turkish issue. Turkey is represented by two delegations, one Ottoman and one Kemalist, in a position of strength as a result of its successes against the Armenians and its favorable relations with the Soviets. Despite the concessions made by the Allies, British Prime Minister Lloyd George demanded that the Turks recognize the "rights of Ottoman Armenian subjects to possess a National Home on the eastern borders of Anatolia." This notion of "home" represents a clear deviation from the terms of the Treaty of Sèvres. This deviation has been denounced by both the Armenian National Delegation and the Delegation of the Republic of Armenia, both of which have demanded that the Treaty of Sèvres be respected in its entirety. The former eventually acquiesces, while the latter persists in its rejection of this revision.

In June 1921, Boghos Nubar Pasha, "demoralized and ill", resigns from his position at the head of the Armenian National Delegation; he is succeeded by Gabriel Noradoungian.

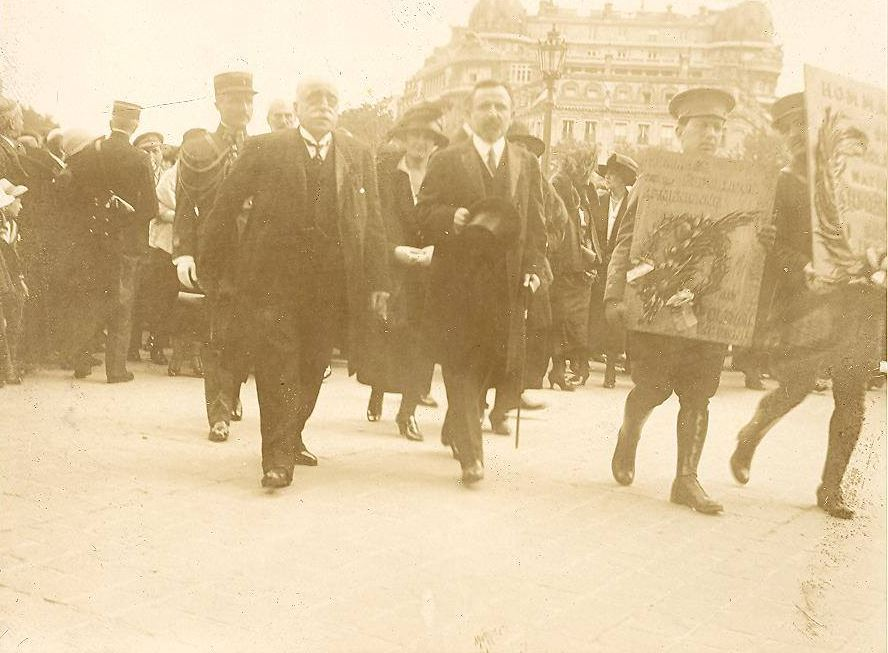
Boghos Nubar Pacha and Avetis Aharonian on the Place de l'Étoile, May 29, 1921.

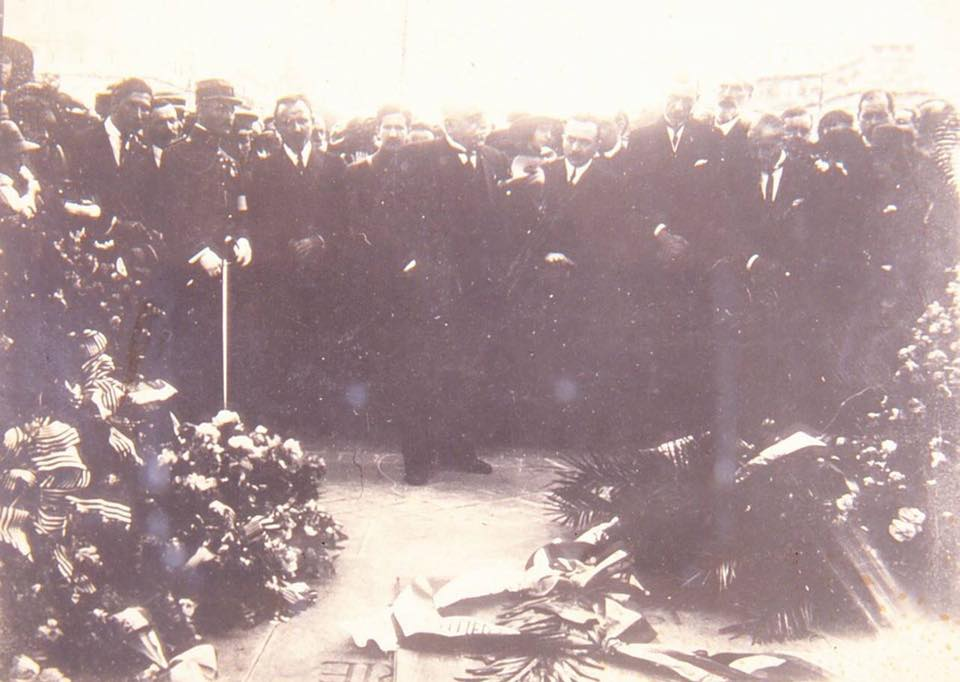
Members of both delegations pay their respects at the Tomb of the Unknown Soldier.

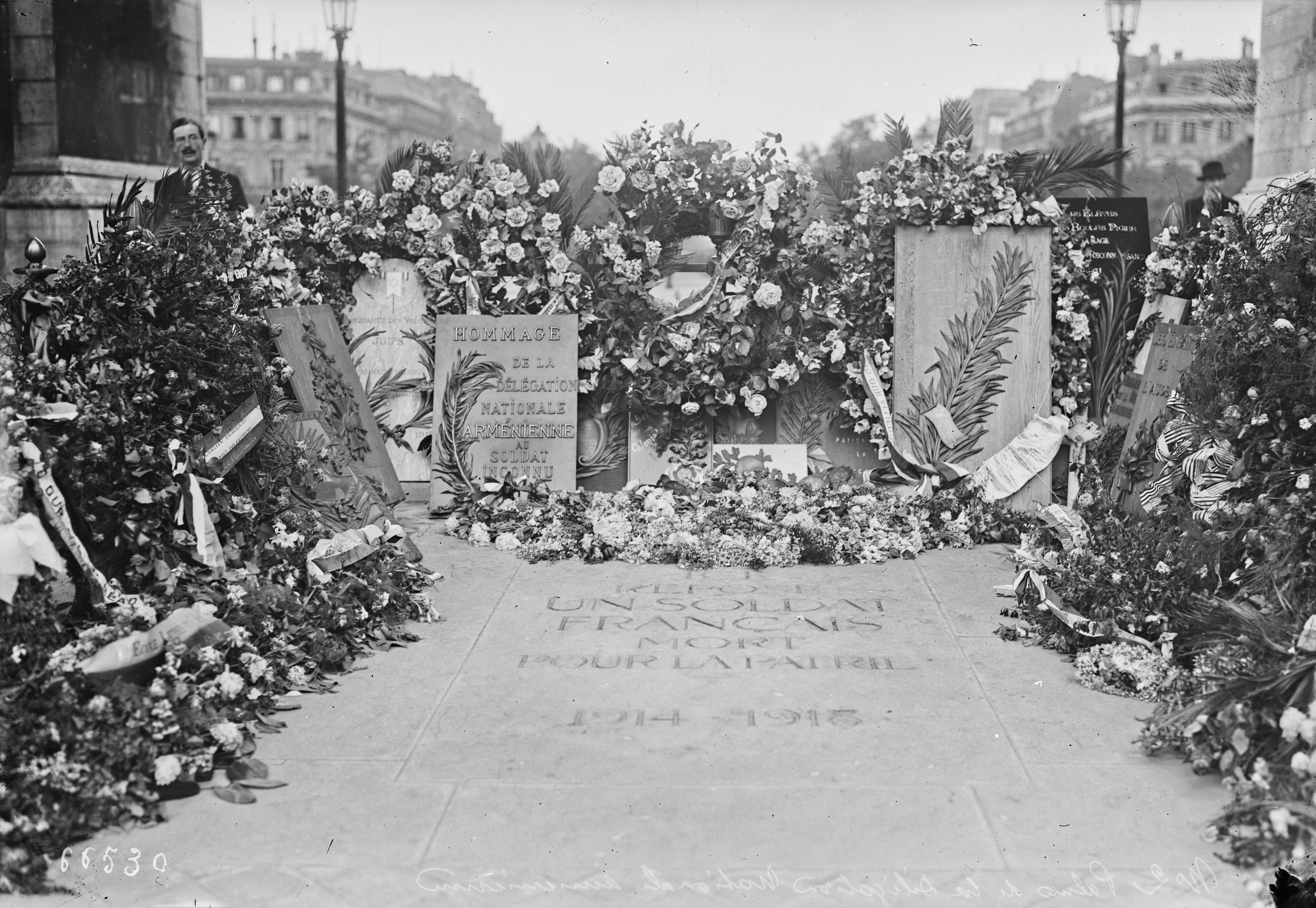
Tribute to the Unknown Soldier by the Armenian National Delegation.

=== Lausanne Conference (November 1922 - July 1923) and Treaty of Lausanne (July 24, 1923) ===
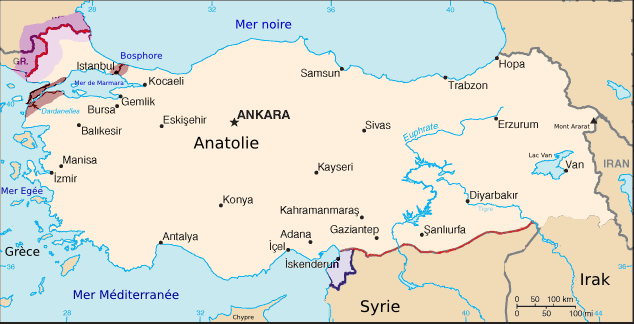
Map of Turkey with its eastern borders as specified in the Treaty of Lausanne.

The Lausanne Conference of 1922-1923 did not extend an invitation to the Armenians. Some participants were present, such as Avetis Aharonian, Alexander Khatissian, Lévon Pachalian, and Gabriel Noradounghian. As Anahide Ter Minassian notes, the latter could observe the burial of the Armenian question "behind the scenes." She adds, "They persistently engage with the Conference for several months, repeatedly seeking engagement with the Allies to reinforce their commitments and pursue a final, though ultimately unsuccessful, diplomatic effort to address the Armenian question." A new memorandum was presented, in which the demand was made for creating an "Armenian home in Turkey." This was intended to accommodate the 700,000 Armenian refugees and potentially result in accession of Turkish territory to the Republic of Armenia. However, they encountered opposition from the Allies, who were reluctant to see an expansion of Soviet Armenia's territory.

Despite their efforts, the Treaty of Lausanne supersedes the Treaty of Sèvres and effectively extinguishes the aspirations for autonomy of Western Armenia or its incorporation into Eastern Armenia within a Greater Armenia.

=== Conclusion (1922–1925) ===
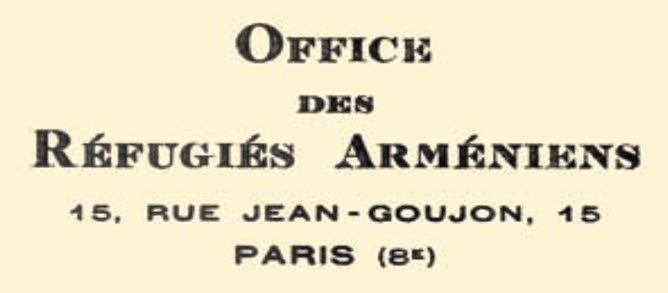
Letterhead used by the Armenian Refugee Office.

In August 1923, the Armenian National Delegation pledged to support the Armenian refugees by advocating for their resettlement in Soviet Armenia. In consequence, the delegation put forth a proposal to the High Commissioner for Refugees of the League of Nations, which entailed the resettlement of 50,000 refugees in the Sardarabad plain, situated close to Yerevan. To foster closer ties with the Armenian diaspora, the Armenian Soviet authorities maintained close relations with organizations such as the Armenian National Delegation and the Armenian General Benevolent Union. This desire was realized with the establishment of the Relief Committee for Armenia in 1921. Discussions with the Delegation had commenced as early as 1922.

The delegation's activities ceased in 1925. A letter dated January 31, 1925, informed the Ministry of Foreign Affairs of its intention to conclude its mission. However, it proposed the formation of a Central Committee for Armenian Refugees in Paris, 56 rue du Faubourg Saint-Honoré, to assume responsibility for continuing its work. The organization that succeeded was established as early as 1924 by Gabriel Noradounghian. It was initially known as the Bureau of Armenian Refugees or the Office of Armenian Refugees and was led by Archag Tchobanian, with Lévon Pachalian serving as secretary-general. In conjunction with the Delegation of the Republic of Armenia, the former Armenian National Delegation assumed responsibility for managing Armenian refugees from 1924 to 1925. This role was subsequently confirmed by presidential decree in 1930. As Anouche Kunth notes, this enables these two delegations to maintain their presence within the national administrative landscape. According to her analysis, the dissolution of the Armenian National Delegation occurred in the wake of the general instruction of December 29, 1924, which removed Armenian nationality from the official list of nationalities. This was indicative of France's acknowledgment of the dissolution of the Armenian Republic.

== Publications ==
- Memorandum sur la question arménienne (in French). Paris: M. Flinikowski. 1919. Archived from the original on July 25, 2023.
- La Question arménienne devant la Conférence de la paix (in French). Paris. 1919. Archived from the original on October 31, 2023.
- Aharonian, Avetis; Nubar Pacha, Boghos (1919). "La Question arménienne" (PDF). La Paix des peuples: Revue internationale de l'organisation politique et économique du monde (in French): 214–236. Archived from the original on February 22, 2024.

== Archives ==
The archives of the Armenian National Delegation are currently housed at the Nubar Library. In the 1980s, some of these materials were transferred to Yerevan and later relocated to the National Archives of Armenia. The remaining collection, comprising the Delegation's correspondence from 1913 to 1921 and an extensive press review compiled by Aram Andonian, remains at the Nubar Library.

== See also ==
- Boghos Nubar
- Armenian question
- Armenian national movement
- Paris Peace Conference (1919–1920)
- 1914 Armenian reforms

== Bibliography ==
- Hovannisian, Richard G (1967). Armenia on the Road to Independence, 1918. University of California Press. ISBN 978-0-520-00574-7.
- Hovannisian, Richard G (1971). The Republic of Armenia. Near Eastern Center, UCLA. Vol. I: The First Year, 1918–1919. University of California Press. ISBN 978-0-520-01984-3.
- Hovannisian, Richard G (2004). "The Republic of Armenia". The Armenian People From Ancient to Modern Times. Vol. II: Foreign Dominion to Statehood: The Fifteenth Century to the Twentieth Century. Palgrave Macmillan. pp. 303–346. ISBN 978-1-4039-6422-9.
- Ter Minassian, Anahide (1997). Histoires croisées : Diaspora, Arménie, Transcaucasie, 1880-1990 (in French). Parenthèses. ISBN 978-2863640760. Archived from the original on March 17, 2023.
- Le Tallec, Cyril (2001). La communauté arménienne de France, 1920-1950 (in French). Éditions L'Harmattan. ISBN 978-2-7475-0480-5. Archived from the original on July 31, 2024.
- Ter Minassian, Anahide (2006). 1918-1920, La République d'Arménie. Historiques (in French). Éditions Complexe. ISBN 978-2-8048-0092-5. Archived from the original on March 16, 2016.
- Kévorkian, Raymond (2006). Le Génocide des Arméniens (in French). Éditions Odile Jacob. ISBN 978-2738118301. Archived from the original on July 8, 2023.
- Ter Minassian, Anahide (2008). "Une histoire arménienne des guerres balkaniques". Balkanologie (in French). X (1–2). Archived from the original on July 10, 2024.
- Kunth, Anouche (2010). "Vu au débarquement. Marseille": Le refuge des Arméniens en France dans les archives de l'Ofpra (PDF) (in French). Fontenay-sous-Bois: OFPRA.
- Ter Minassian, Anahide (2007). "XII « L'Arménie et l'éveil des nationalités (1800-1914)". Histoire du peuple arménien (in French). Privat. pp. 475–521. ISBN 978-2708968745.
- Mouradian, Claire (2015). "La diplomatie des « petites nations » : 1913-1923, une décennie de (vaines) tentatives pour résoudre la question arménienne". Revue d'Histoire de la Shoah (in French). 202 (1): 373–505. doi:10.3917/rhsho.202.0373. Archived from the original on June 9, 2022.
- Kunth, Anouche (2016). Exils arméniens : Du Caucase à Paris 1920-1945. Contemporaines (in French). Belin. ISBN 978-2701198385. Archived from the original on January 31, 2023.
- Kunth, Anouche (2017). "Le refuge arménien et sa double représentation: dans les méandres des anciens offices (1919-1945)". Réfugiés et apatrides : Administrer l'asile en France (1920-1960) (in French). Presses Universitaires de Rennes. pp. 65–80. ISBN 978-2753554863. Archived from the original on October 3, 2023.
- Papazian, Taline (2017). "Engagement militaire et droits politiques des Arméniens: La Légion d'Orient, exemple de négociations entre une nationalité non souveraine et ses Alliés européens". Revue des mondes musulmans et de la Méditerranée (in French) (141 « Par delà le théâtre européen de 14-18: L’autre grande guerre dans le monde musulman »): 121–137. doi:10.4000/remmm.9875. Archived from the original on June 15, 2024.
- Laycock, Jo (2019). "Developing a Soviet Armenian Nation: Refugees and Resettlement in the Early Soviet South Caucasus". Empire and Belonging in the Eurasian Borderlands. Cornell University Press. pp. 97–111. ISBN 9781501736131. Archived from the original on July 31, 2014.
