= James Aratoon Malcolm =

British-Iranian Armenian financier (1866–1952)

- Born: 11 November 1866; Bushehr, Iran
- Died: July 18, 1952 (aged 85); London, England
- Resting place: St Sarkis Church, London
- Education: Balliol College, Oxford
- Known for: Armenian National Delegation Chairman of the Royal Thames Yacht Club Co-founder of the Veterans Club
- Father: Aratoon Malcolm

James Aratoon Malcolm (11 November 1866 – 18 July 1952), also known by James Aratoon Malcolm Bagration, was a British-Iranian Armenian financier, company promoter, arms dealer, and journalist. Malcolm attended Balliol College, Oxford. He played a major role in negotiations during and after the First Balkan War as one of the five members of the Armenian National Delegation. Malcolm was also a member of the Royal Thames Yacht Club, the British Empire League, and the Victory Services Club. He died on 18 July 1952.

== Early life ==
Malcolm was born in Bushehr, Iran (known as Bushire, Persia), on the Persian Gulf in 1866.

Malcolm's father was Aratoon Malcolm, also of Bushehr, whose family had lived in Persia "since before Elizabethan days," being active in shipping and commerce. They had acted as treasurers to British missions to the Shah of Persia. The Malcolm family had numerous contacts with important financial families in the region, such as that of David Sassoon.

Malcolm came to England for his education at the age of 13, under the guardianship of Albert Sassoon (1818–1896). As a child he was friends with Albert Goldsmid. He was educated at the private Herne House School in Margate, Kent, before attending Balliol College, Oxford, between 1886 and 1889.

He was granted a British Certificate of Naturalization on 7 September 1907, which cited his name as "James Aratoon Malcolm Bagration" and his address as the Hotel Russell, Russell Square, London.

== Career ==
=== Social endeavors and political appointments ===
Malcolm was a founder of the British Empire League in 1894. In 1906, Malcolm was named chairman of the Royal Thames Yacht Club. In 1907, he was co-founder (with Arthur Haggard) of the Veterans Club. The club was originally intended to be housed in an imposing building to be erected on Kingsway in central London at an estimated cost of £150,000. That plan was abandoned in 1910, and in early 1911, the club opened in more modest premises at Hand Court, High Holborn.

In early 1916, Malcolm was appointed by Catholicos George V of Armenia as one of the five members of the Armenian National Delegation to lead negotiations during and after the First Balkan War. The Delegation, led by Paris-based Boghos Nubar Pasha, had been established in 1912. Since his appointment, Malcolm was the effective representative of the delegation in London; all other members were based in Paris. In 1929, the King of Belgium conferred the Order of Leopold on Malcolm for his services to the Allies during the First World War.

Sir Herbert Samuel referred to Malcolm as "the actual initiator of the Balfour Declaration" regarding the British Palestine Mandate. In a letter to the editor, published in The Times on 17 June 1922, Malcolm stated that he had been "the 'channel of communication,' or rather the intermediary" between the Zionist organization and the British Government in early 1917. He was responding to an earlier letter published in The Times of 15 June 1922, which had asserted that Samuel had been "the channel of communication."

The Veterans Club was renamed in April 1936 to the Allenby Services Club and in 1944 to the Victory Ex-Services Club. In 1952, this club (of which Malcolm was honorary treasurer) had premises at 73-79 Seymour Street, Marble Arch, and over 18,600 members. Malcolm was also a co-founder of the United Services Corps. He was awarded an OBE in 1948.

=== Journalism ===
In 1888, while still a student at Balliol College, he joined with Mihran Sevasly (1863–1935) and Jean Broussali to found Le Haiasdan, a journal published under the auspices of the Central Committee of the Armenian Patriotic Association in London. The journal was published in French and Armenian and commenced as a twice-monthly, later shifting to monthly. The first issue was dated 1 November 1888. Malcolm attended the Oxford Union meeting of November 1889 in the capacity of secretary of Le Haiasdan.

In May 1891, the management arrangements of Le Haiasdan were changed. Sevasly remained editor, but a subcommittee of the newly formed Anglo-Armenian Committee was to supervise. The subcommittee was to be composed of three English sympathisers plus three Armenians, with MP F. Stevenson as its chairman. The motivation for this move was to prevent the journal from including material "needlessly provocative" to the Turkish government.

Le Haiasdan ceased publication in 1892. In May 1893, Malcolm resigned from the executive committee of the Anglo-Armenian Association and set out his reasons for doing so in a letter published in The Echo. A letter published in The Morning Post in December 1894 praised Malcolm and his co-founders of Le Haiasdan in 1888 as "three thoroughly able, intelligent young Armenians [who] with great energy and pluck, resuscitated the all-but-forgotten Armenian Question..."

After leaving university, Malcolm published a political-financial newspaper in London titled The Financial Standard and Imperial Post. An action for libel arising from what his newspaper had published regarding "the Barker case" resulted in a verdict against him, with damages set at £2,000. This led to Malcolm being adjudicated bankrupt on 29 March 1893. He later became one of the founders and editors of the Hayastan Daily during the Armenian Genocide.

=== Company promoting 1896 to 1898 ===
In May 1896, Malcolm, Arthur Watling, and Foster Grave formed the Diggers Venture Syndicate Limited. With authorized capital of £9,000, the company would buy options over assets to be sold at a profit into newly created companies, with these companies obtaining funding from the public by publishing prospectuses advertising the companies whose options they bought.

The first public prospectus was for the Globe Venture Syndicate Ltd. in 1897. The prospectus stated that this company had acquired a "treaty" from the Diggers Venture Syndicate by which the chiefs of a group of tribes in the Suss region of northwestern Africa (near the Noun River) granted a "Direct Trading Monopoly" over that area. In March 1899, a legal action was commenced by J.P. Foster, a shareholder in the Globe Venture Syndicate. Foster was seeking a declaration that he had been induced to apply for the shares by fraudulent misrepresentation in the prospectus, particularly in regard to the "treaty." In April 1900, the Chancery Court found in Foster's favour and awarded him £2,000 in damages plus costs. In June 1900, a winding-up order was made against the Globe Venture Syndicate. The process led to a public examination of Malcolm as the company's manager and Arthur Watling as a director in February 1901. The various court processes revealed that the Diggers Venture Syndicate never had capital higher than £64. Each of the three founders invested £20 plus £1 each from the four other initial subscribers required to make up the legally required minimum of seven for a registered company.

The Globe Venture Syndicate Limited had been used as the vehicle for mounting two further company promotions: The Gutta Percha Corporation Limited (prospectus published December 1897) and The British Drying Company Limited (prospectus published March 1898.) Both went into winding-up processes in 1900; both of these processes involved court hearings in which Malcolm's name featured prominently. The chairman of The Gutta Percha Corporation Limited, Sir Edward Thornton, stated in court that he had taken on that post "at the invitation of Mr. Malcom." Thornton had earlier been recruited by J. A. Malcolm to chair the Globe Venture Syndicate, having been introduced to him in June 1896. In the case of the flotation of The British Drying Company, a company titled The Joint Stock Finance Co. Ltd. played a significant role in the underwriting arrangements. The court processes revealed that this company had authorized capital of £500 and paid-up capital of only £7. Justice Kekewich, giving judgment in the Chancery Court case Foster v. British Drying Company, was reported as stating, "The real question was whether Mr. Malcolm, to whom so much reference had been made in the evidence, was the Joint Stock Finance Company Limited – and he assumed for the present purpose that Mr. Malcolm was the Joint Stock Finance Company."

=== Company promoting 1899 to 1905 ===
In April 1899, Malcolm, George Grove Blackwell Jr. (1869–1934), and James Kenneth Douglas Mackenzie (1859–1930) established The New Dominion Syndicate Limited to raise the finances required for the construction of the Georgian Bay Canal scheme in Canada. The Canadian Parliament passed an act in 1894 creating the Montreal, Ottawa, and Georgian Bay Canal Company and empowering it to construct that waterway project. McLeod Stewart (1847–1926), the leading advocate of the scheme in Canada, traveled to Britain and entered into negotiations with Malcolm's group about raising the required funds from British sources. Advertising the Georgian Bay scheme to the British investing public was commenced with a function at the Liverpool Chamber of Commerce, arranged through Blackwell. Malcolm attended that gathering on 25 April 1899 as the manager of The New Dominion Syndicate Limited. The event was addressed by McLeod Stewart, followed by Sir Edward Thornton, who was the chairman of The New Dominion Syndicate Limited.

Malcolm secured an annulment of his 1893 bankruptcy on 23 June 1901, a step that required the bankruptcy court to be satisfied that his debts had been paid in full. During the course of his company promoting activities, referred to above, it would have caused legal problems if he had been presented as a director of any limited liability company. Also, it was important that he was not seen to be deploying funds into speculative pursuits, which instead should have been applied to reducing his debts. In a July 1899 court hearing regarding The British Drying Company Limited, it was stated in sworn evidence that the "principal promoter" of that concern was A. E. Baines and "Mr. Malcolm superintended the allotment, but at that time held no official position in the company, except that he entered into an agreement with Mr. Baines, the promoter, to find sufficient money to promote the company." In regard to the Diggers Venture Syndicate, Malcolm stated in court that it was not he who had "taken up" £20 of shares in that company, but his brother Leo, then residing in Iran, who had taken up the shares on his behalf.

On 11 December 1901, it was reported to the British Registrar of Companies that James Aratoon Malcolm had been elected a director of The Electric Tramways Construction and Maintenance Company Limited. Registered in December 1886 but for many years dormant, this company was under the control of Harry John Lawson (1852–1925). Lawson had put the company into use as the parent entity for the City and North East Suburban Electric Railway (C&NESER) scheme, also known as The Wandsworth Tube scheme. One of Malcolm's colleagues in establishing The New Dominion Syndicate Limited, James K. D. Mackenzie, had been recruited in September 1901 by Lawson to chair the Electric Tramways Construction and Maintenance Company. During the 1902 session of Parliament, the bill promoted to obtain authorization for the C&NESER scheme played an important role between the two principal competing visions for the future of London's underground railway system. The first was that of Charles Tyson Yerkes and Robert William Perks. The second was that of J.P. Morgan. The C&NESER scheme received support from both Perks and Morgan. Malcolm resigned from the board of the parent company of the C&NESER in January 1902.

=== Company promoting 1906 to 1915 ===
In April 1906, Malcolm promoted The Improved Construction Company Limited to manufacture and deal in "artificial stone, concrete, or other products having cement as a binding ingredient." The statutory meeting of this company was held on 10 July 1906, chaired by Malcolm. The aim of this company, he told the meeting, was to use machinery invented by Peter Burd Jagger (their works manager and consulting engineer) to produce cement-based products at a lower cost and of higher quality than had hitherto been done. There was also a prospect of securing further revenue by licensing other firms to use Jagger's patents.

In December 1906, Malcolm promoted "Pay-az-u-go Billiards (Hepton's Patents) Limited" (with authorized capital of £35,000). This company took over a going concern (Hepton's Automatic Patents Company, of Burbage Road, Plumstead), which was manufacturing coin-in-the-slot billiard tables and marketing these for use in public houses and clubs. The marketing included sponsoring competitions using the tables. James Aratoon Malcolm signed as being chairman of this company during 1907. This company appears to have been a commercial success but was dissolved in 1915.

=== Arms dealing ===
In mid-October 1899, the Exchange Telegraph Company reported that Malcolm made an offer to the British War Office to provide 1,000 sharpshooters, "fully-armed with Martini rifles," [sic] for service in South Africa as auxiliaries to the Imperial forces. Malcolm had previously fitted Major Albert Gybbon Spilsbury's Tourmaline yacht for its 1897 expedition to Mogador, Morocco.

=== Russia Society ===
In early 1915, Malcolm sent notices to various British newspapers announcing the formation of the Russia Society "to promote and maintain a permanent and sympathetic understanding between the peoples of the British and Russian Empires ... to disseminate knowledge of each other, among each other ... to encourage reciprocal travel and social intercourse, and generally to establish mutual friendship in its widest and frankest sense." Intending members were requested to contact Malcolm, "the acting hon. secretary," at 47 Victoria Street, S.W. – which was the office address of The Improved Construction Company Limited (reference above). The inaugural meeting of the Russia Society was held at the Speaker's House, Westminster, on 10 March 1915. The 1934 edition of The Balliol College Register stated that Malcolm had received thanks from the Tsar for establishing the club.

In February 1917, it was announced that an agreement had been reached for the Russia Society to amalgamate with the Anglo-Russian Friendship Society and the Anglo-Russian Committee to form the United Russia Societies Association. Malcolm became a member of the committee of the new association, which held its inaugural meeting at the Speaker's House, Westminster, on 2 March 1917. The Hon. Treasurer of The United Russia Societies Association was Sir Robert William Perks, who had been on the committee of the Russia Society. He and Malcolm had known one another for many years through their shared interest in the proposed Georgian Bay Canal Scheme in Canada.

=== Financing activities ===
As a contractor for public works, Malcolm proposed to finance the Baku aqueduct, the longest water conduit in Europe, which was ultimately financed by Zeynalabdin Taghiyev. He was also interested in extensions to the London Docks and the Canadian Trent–Severn Waterway. He was chairman and managing director of the Improved Construction Company Ltd., which received the contract to supply 110 miles (180 km) of concrete pipes for the Baku aqueduct project.

In 1912, he negotiated on behalf of the Chinese government for the £5 million Crisp loan led by Charles Birch Crisp to the Republic of China.

Malcolm was the secretary of the Montreal, Ottawa and Georgian Bay Canal (British Claims) Trust, which was registered as a British limited liability company on 21 April 1928.

== Death ==
Malcom died in London on 18 July 1952, aged 85. He was buried at the Armenian Church, Iverna-gardens, London W.8 on 24 July 1952.

== Publications ==
- Partition of Palestine. Suggested alterations in proposed frontiers (Mar 1938), Apollo Press, London
- Origins of the Balfour Declaration: Dr. Weizmann's Contribution (1944), British Museum
- "An Armenian's Cry for Armenia", Nineteenth Century, Volume 28, Issue 164 (October 1890), pp. 640–647
- "The Russia Society", The Westminster Gazette, 28 July 1915, p. 2
