= John Malcolm (disambiguation) =

John Malcolm (1769–1833) was a Scottish soldier, diplomat and historian.

John Malcolm may also refer to:

- John Malcolm (Loyalist) (1723–1788), sea captain, army officer, and British customs official
- John Malcolm (surgeon) (1814–1895), English surgeon and hydrotherapist
- John Malcolm, 1st Baron Malcolm (1833–1902), British soldier and Conservative politician
- John Malcolm (actor) (1936–2008), Scottish actor
- John Malcolm (professor) (1873–1954), New Zealand physiologist and university professor
- John Malcolm (footballer) (1917–2009), Scottish footballer
- John Malcolm (bowls), New Zealand lawn bowler
- Sir John Malcolm, 1st Baronet (1646–1729), of the Malcolm Baronets, MP for Forfar
- Sir John Malcolm, 2nd Baronet (1681–1753), of the Malcolm baronets
- Sir John Malcolm, 5th Baronet (1749–1816), of the Malcolm baronets
- Sir John Malcolm, 7th Baronet (1828–1865), of the Malcolm baronets
- John Malcolm, pseudonym of John Andrews (born 1936) crime writer and author of the Tim Simpson series
- John Malcolm, pseudonym of Malcolm John Batt (1929–2007), British solicitor, composer and author
