= Nubar Library =

Cultural institution in Paris, France

- Bibliothèque Nubar
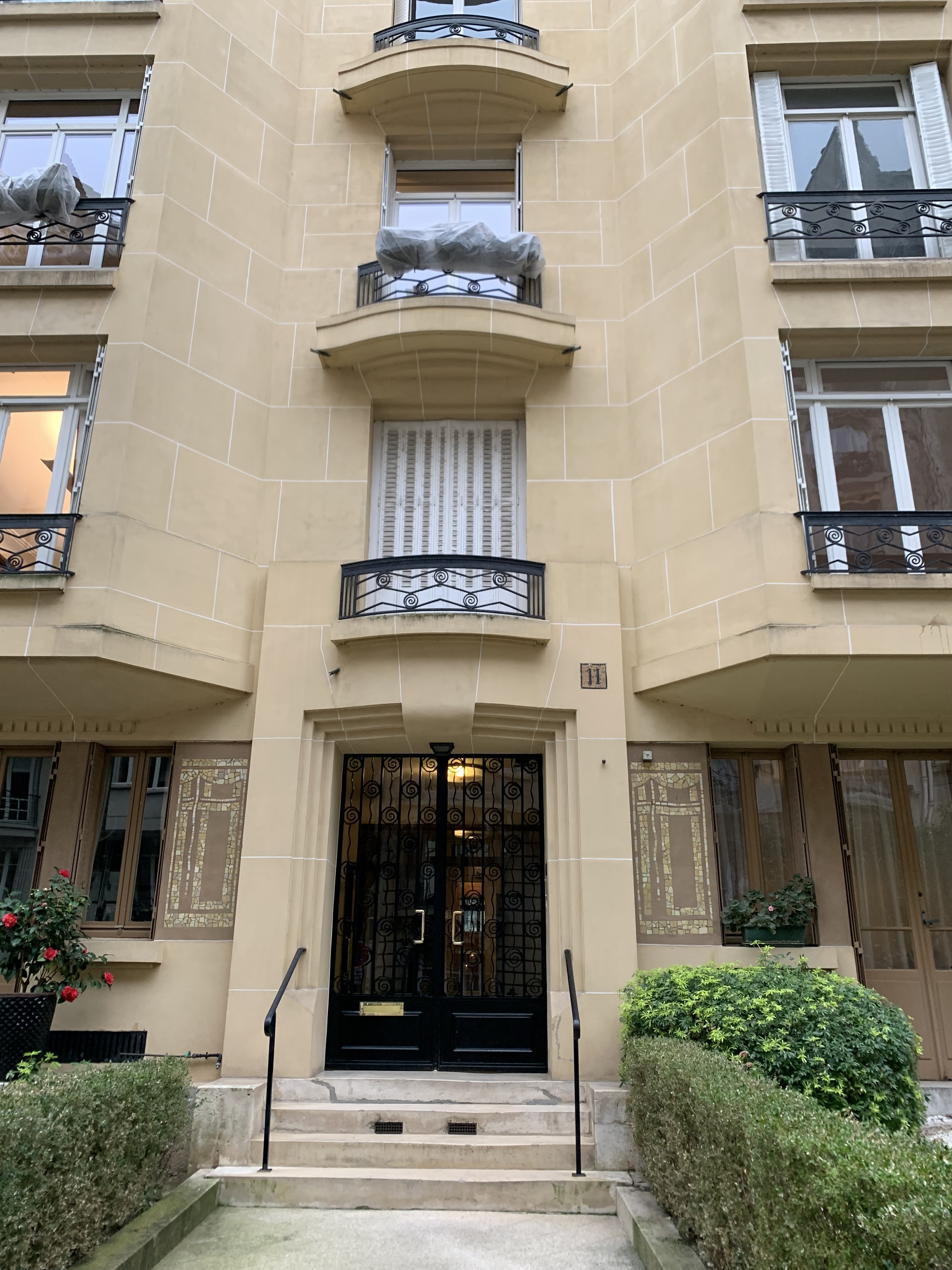
- Exterior entrance to the Nubar Library.
- 48°51′29″N 2°17′12″E
- Location: Paris, France
- Type: Institution, library
- Established: 1928
- Branch of: Armenian General Benevolent Union

Other information
- Director: Boris Adjemian (since 2012)
- Website: bnulibrary.org

The Nubar Library is a cultural and scientific institution of the Armenian diaspora. It was founded in Paris in 1928 by Boghos Nubar Pacha and is part of the Armenian General Benevolent Union (AGBU). Since 2012, it has been directed by historian Boris Adjemian.

== History ==
The Nubar Library was founded in 1928 on the initiative of Boghos Nubar Pacha, in an Art Deco building constructed in 1922 by a group of Armenian developers and designed by architect Levon Nalfiyan. From 1928 to 1951, its management was entrusted to Aram Andonian, then secretary to the Armenian National Delegation in Paris. Initially called the “Bibliothèque nationale arménienne de Paris,” the library was renamed the “Bibliothèque Nubar” after Boghos Nubar died in 1930.

For its founders, the library was intended as a place to gather, preserve, and study the heritage of Ottoman Armenians, much of which had been destroyed during the Armenian genocide, and to ensure the continuity and development of the Armenian diaspora. Aram Andonian describes it as “a home for Armenian and Oriental studies, open not only to the many friends of the Armenian nation and French and Armenian scholars interested in these studies”, but also as “a meeting place for Armenian and other intellectuals, who, in addition to reading, deal with the most pressing needs of the Armenian nation and issues of interest to Armenian life.”

As director, Aram Andonian collected numerous books, manuscripts, periodicals, archives, photographs, and postcards.

During the Second World War, despite Armenian reluctance, the Nazi authorities seized works from the library. They transferred them to Berlin, to study the cultural heritage of the Armenians and their link with the “Aryan race.”

Today, the Nubar Library continues to enrich its collections through acquisitions (recent works in Armenian, French, English, Turkish, etc.), which now focus on contemporary history, art history, and Western Armenian literature. The Library also receives donations of family documents (family trees, personal memoirs, and other written testimonies, photographs, etc.), authors' manuscripts, and private correspondence. It also collects university theses and dissertations on Armenian themes.

On November 18, 2020, the Nubar Library was awarded the “Heritage of Regional Interest” label by the Regional Council of Île-de-France. The plaque was inaugurated on April 24, 2021, by Valérie Pécresse, in the presence of AGBU France President Nadia Gortzounian, Hasmik Tolmajian, Armenian Ambassador to France, and CCAF co-presidents Ara Toranian and Mourad Papazian. This label enables the library to obtain funding from the Regional Council for the digitization of its collections.

Between March 22 and July 11, 2021, the Library is partnering the exhibition “The Genocide of the Armenians of the Ottoman Empire” at the Shoah Memorial, alongside the town of Drancy, France Télévisions, Toute l'Histoire, Nouvelles d'Arménie Magazine, the Tebrotzassère school, the National Archives of Armenia and the Musée arménien de France.

== Funds ==
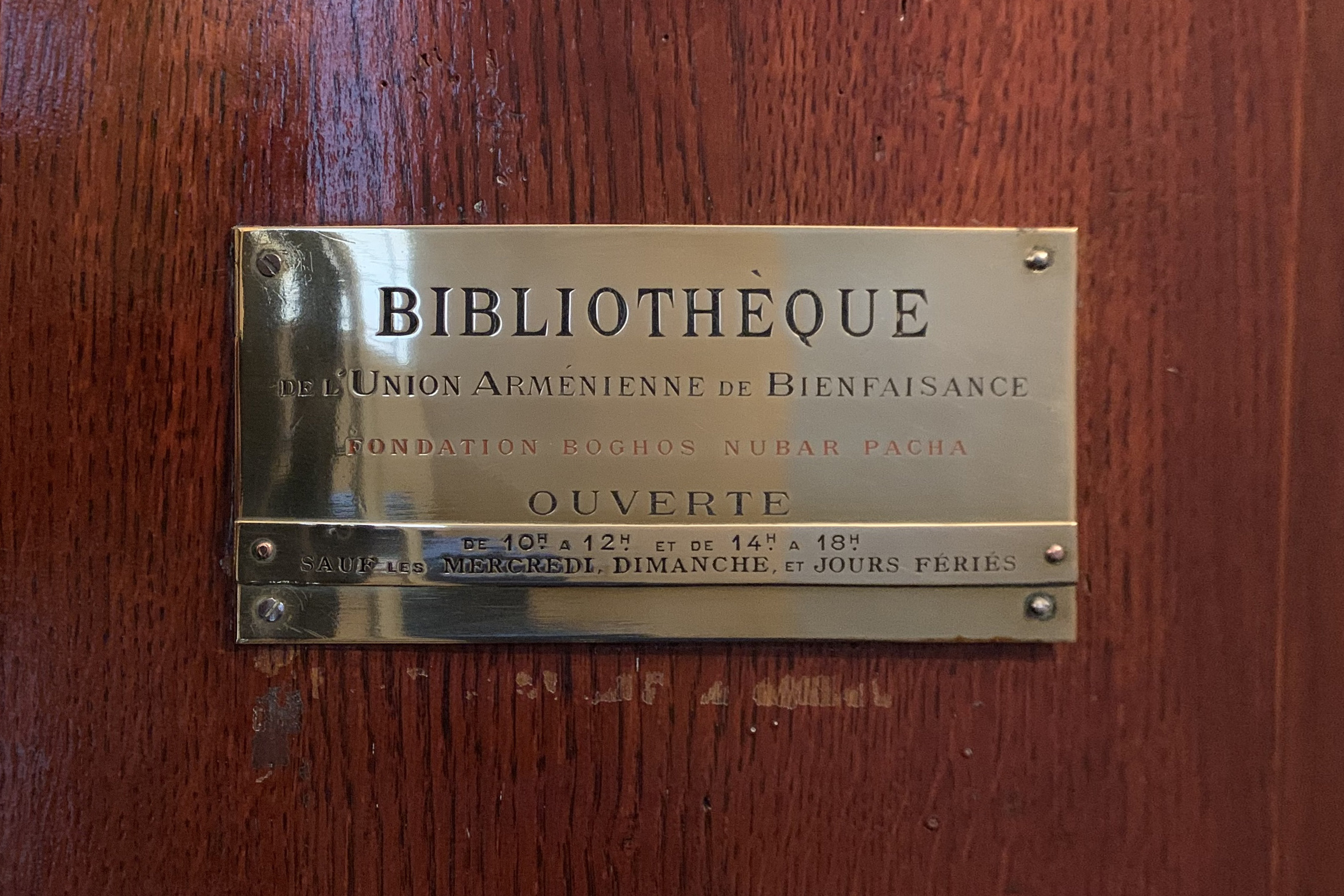
Plaque affixed to the entrance door of the library.

The library's holdings include:

- 43,000 printed works, including numerous Constantinople editions from the 19th and early 20th centuries, as well as many works printed in Venice from the 18th to the early 20th centuries;
- 800,000 archival documents, including part of the archives of the Armenian Patriarchate of Constantinople, an archive on the genocide (the Andonian collection), the AGBU archives, and those of the Armenian National Delegation. Also included are the archives of the Nansen passport for Armenian Refugees, the Zareh Bey Nubar fonds (documents relating to Nubar Pasha's action in Egypt), various correspondence from writers (such as Nichan Béchiktachlian or Zareh Vorpouni) or Orientalist and Armenologist scholars, as well as correspondence from the Nubar Library itself between 1928 and the 1980s;
- 1,400 periodical collections, including a large part of the Ottoman Armenian press;
- 10,000 original photographic prints, including AGB U's photographic collection of orphans, refugees, and schools founded in the Near East and diaspora after the First World War;
- Several hundred manuscripts from the 19th and 20th centuries.

== Publications ==
The Nubar Library publishes:

- the Revue d'histoire arménienne contemporaine between 1995 and 2009;
- the Revue arménienne des questions contemporaines between 2004 and 2012;
- the journal Études arméniennes contemporaines since 2013.

== List of directors ==
- 1928-1951: Aram Andonian
- 1952-1970: Armenag Salmaslian
- 1970-1986: Ardachès Kardachian
- 1986-2012: Raymond Kévorkian
- 2012-: Boris Adjemian

== See also ==
- Boghos Nubar
- Aram Andonian
- Armenian General Benevolent Union
- Armenian National Delegation
- List of libraries in France

== Bibliography ==
- "La Bibliothèque arménienne de Paris" [The Armenian Library of Paris]. Le Foyer (in French). 17: 1. 1929.
- Adjemian, Boris; Kévorkian, Raymond (2015). "Témoignages de rescapés et connaissance du génocide de 1915-1916" [Survivor testimonies and knowledge of the 1915-1916 genocide] (PDF). Études arméniennes contemporaines (in French). 5 (5): 79-111. doi:10.4000/eac.755.
- "Bibliothèque Nubar" [Nubar Library]. L'Histoire (in French). 2017.
- Adjemian, Boris (2019). "Archives". Revue d'histoire (in French). 144 (4): 175-181.

=== External links ===
- "Official website". Nubar Library.
- "Bibliothèque Nubar (UGAB - Union Générale Arménienne de Bienfaisance)" [Nubar Library (UGAB - Armenian General Benevolent Union)]. Nubar Library (in French).
