= Malcomson =

Malcomson is a surname. Notable people with the surname include:

- A.P.W. Malcomson (born 1945), British-Irish archivist and historian
- Alexander Y. Malcomson (1865–1923), coal dealer from Detroit who financed Henry Ford
- James M. Malcomson, British-Irish economist
- Paula Malcomson (born 1970), Scottish-Irish actress
- Ruth Malcomson (1906–1988), Miss America in 1924
- Scott Malcomson (born 1961), American journalist and political reporter
- Malcomson family

== See also ==
- Malcomson and Higginbotham, an architectural firm based in Detroit
- Malcolmson
- Malcolm (disambiguation)
