= James Malcolm =

James Malcolm may refer to:

== Baronets ==
- Sir James Malcolm, 4th Baronet (died 1805) of the Malcolm baronets
- Sir James Malcolm, 8th Baronet (1823–1901) of the Malcolm baronets
- Sir James William Malcolm, 9th Baronet (1862–1927) of the Malcolm baronets
- Sir James William Thomas Alexander Malcolm, 12th Baronet (1930–2012) of the Malcolm baronets

== Others ==
- James Malcolm (politician) (1880–1935), Canadian politician
- James Aratoon Malcolm (1868–?), British-Armenian financier, arms dealer and journalist
- James Malcolm (Royal Marines officer) (1767–1849), Scottish officer of the British Royal Marines
- James Peller Malcolm (1767–1815), American-English topographer and engraver
- James Malcolm (rugby union) (born 1994), Scottish rugby union player
