= Ras al-Ayn camps =

Death camps of the Armenian genocide

Ra's al-'Ayn Camps
- Concentration camp
- Known for: Mass murder and abuse of Ottoman Armenian civilians during the Armenian genocide
- Location: Ras al-Ayn, Ottoman Empire (Present-day Syria)
- Built by: Ottoman Empire
- Operated by: Ottoman Empire: Ottoman army
- Operational: 1910s
- Inmates: Armenians
- Killed: 80,000

The Ras al-Ayn camps (also Ras ul-Ain camps) were desert death camps near the city of Ras al-Ayn in northeastern Syria, where many Armenians were deported and slaughtered during the Armenian genocide. The site became "synonymous with Armenian suffering".

== History ==
Ras al-Ayn became a major collecting place for deported Armenians from Anatolia. By September 1915, groups of refugees (usually made up of women and children) began to arrive after the exhausting journey. In April 1916 the German consul reported "again massacre at Ras ul Ain": "300 to 500 deportees are taken out of the concentration camp each day and butchered at a distance of 10 km. from Ras ul Ain" In the summer of 1916 new rounds of massacres were improvised by the Turkish government in the areas of Deir ez-Zor, Rakka and Ras ul-Ain. In 1916, over 80,000 of Armenians were slaughtered in Ras al-Ayn. According to reports, in one day alone 300-400 women arrived to the camps completely naked and were plundered by Chechens and gendarmerie: "All the bodies, without exception, were entirely naked and the wounds that had been inflicted showed that the victims had been killed, after having been subjected to unspeakable brutalities". The local kaimakam (governor) ordered the massacre of deported Armenians. Daurri (Diirri) Bey, son of the Turkish Bey of Aleppo Defterdar Djemal, was the official High Executioner of Armenians at Ras-el-Ain: "this brute, after robbing them of their jewelry chose the youngest girls of good families and kept them for a harem".

An Armenian eyewitness wrote that:

"While we were marching the Turkish soldiers, with drawn swords, suddenly made their way through the crowd, and, like beasts let loose in a flock of sheep, killed and wounded many.. The rest still dragged on under the influence of the bloody swords until Ras-ul-Ain Desert was reached. This place was especially noted for the carrying of their butchery, for all that were sent to these parts were sent there to die." "Armenian Tells Of Death Pilgrimage", New York Times, July 27, 1919

Several times, entire camps in Ras ul-Ayn were liquidated as a prevention against typhoid epidemics. According to US Ambassador Henry Morgenthau, Sr., the route to Ras-ul-Ain for Armenian travellers "was one prolonged horror".

== Famous deportees ==
- Aram Andonian
- Hovhannes Kımpetyan (1894–1915), a poet and educator, perished during the deportation in Ras ul-Ain at the age of twenty one.

== In popular culture ==
Some scenes in the 2014 movie The Cut use a representation of the camp.

== See also ==
- Death march
- Deir ez-Zor Camps
- Armenians in Syria

== Bibliography ==
- Gaunt, David (2006). Massacres, Resistance, Protectors Muslim-Christian Relations in Eastern Anatolia during World War I. Gorgias Press. ISBN 1-5933-3301-3. OL 8871940M.
- Miller, Donald E.; Miller, Lorna Touryan (1999). Survivors: An Oral History Of The Armenian Genocide. University of California Press. ISBN 0-5202-1956-2. OL 7710700M.
