= Arshag Chobanian =

Armenian writer (1872–1954)

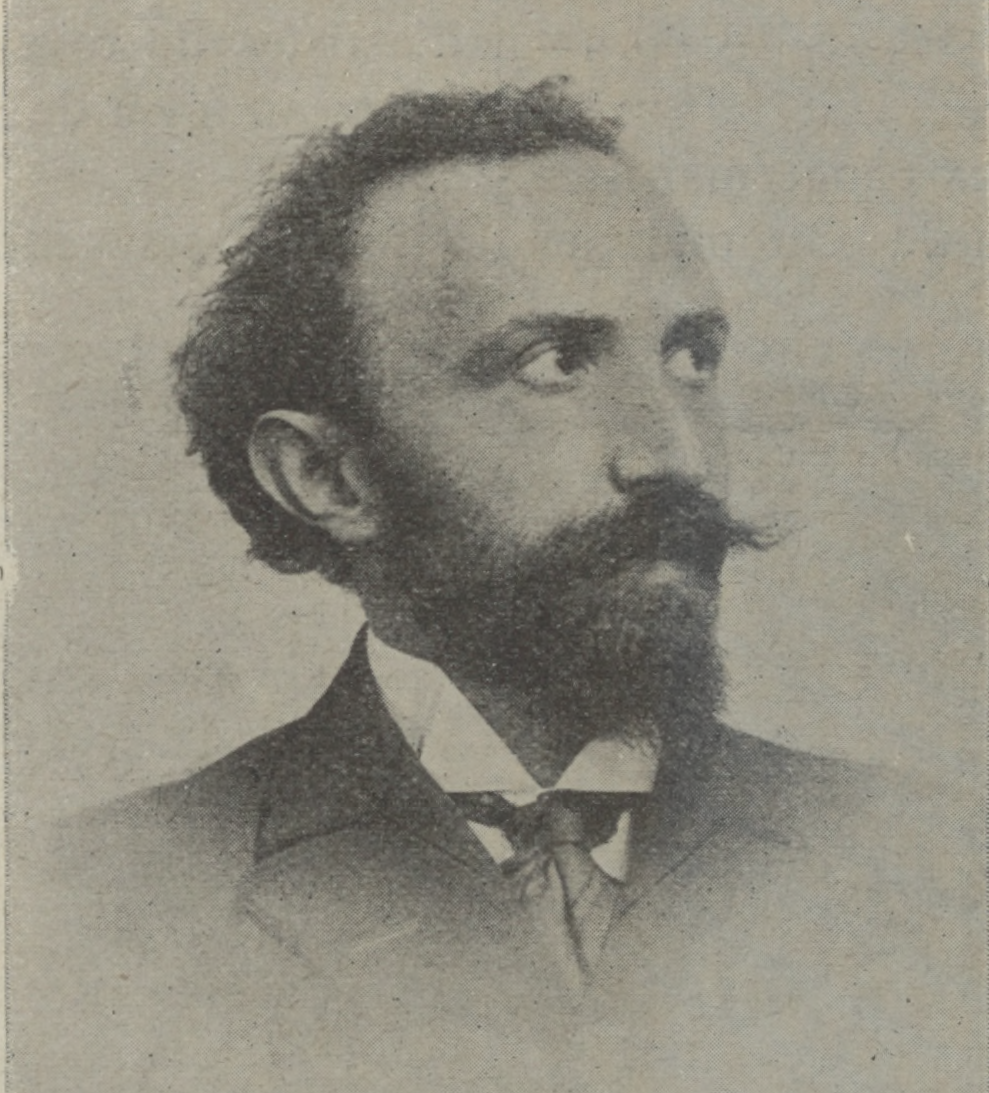
- Born: 15 July 1872; Beşiktaş, Constantinople, Ottoman Empire
- Died: 9 June 1954 (aged 81); Paris, France
- Occupations: Short story writer, poet, writer, translator, playwright, and literary critic.

Arshag Chobanian (Armenian: Արշակ Չօպանեան, also Tchobanian; 15 July 1872 – 9 June 1954) was an Armenian short story writer, journalist, editor, poet, translator, literary critic, playwright, philologist, and novelist.

== Biography ==
His father was a respected goldsmith.

In 1898 he founded his famous periodical Anahit. His connections and acquaintances with prominent literary and intellectual figures in France allowed him to write about the Armenian genocide and injustices freely in popular French newspapers such as Mercure de France. He became a strong advocate of western support in order to save the Armenians from the oppression of the Ottoman government. After joining the Ramgavar party, he met with Boghos Nubar and participated in the Armenian National Delegation during the Paris Peace Conference of 1919. In 1933 he visited Soviet Armenia and met with prominent intellectuals. After returning to Paris, he died on 9 June 1954.

== Literary career ==
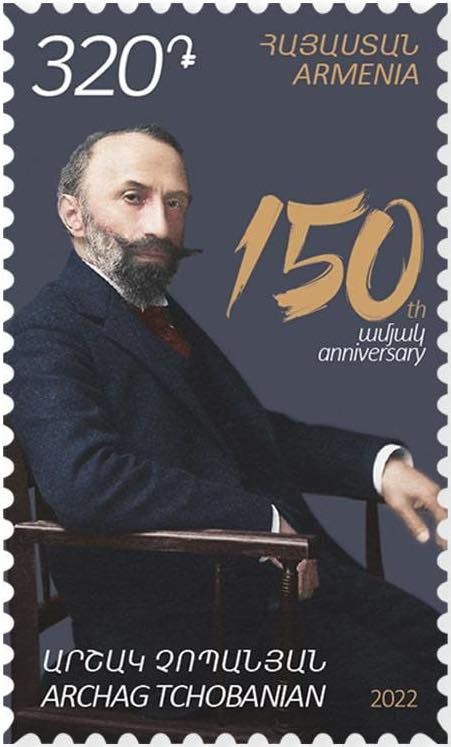
Chobanian on a 2022 stamp of Armenia

Arshag Chobanian is considered one of the fundamental Armenian realist writers, though he also has many works in the romantic style as well.

Among some of the readers of these writings was famed French novelist and writer Anatole France, who thereafter sympathized with the plight of the Armenian people. Chobanian wrote literary criticism of European writers such as Emile Verhaeren, Honoré de Balzac, Victor Hugo, Émile Zola, Henrik Ibsen, and many more.
