= Malcolmson =

Malcolmson is a surname. Notable people with the surname include:

- John Malcolmson VC MVO (1835–1902), Scottish officer in the Bengal army, Recipient of the Victoria Cross
- Leslie Malcolmson (1910–1993), Irish rugby union player
- Mary Malcolmson (1864–1935), started the first Girl Guide company in Canada
- Sam Malcolmson (1947–2024), Scottish footballer
- Sheila Malcolmson (born 1966), Canadian politician
- Steven Malcolmson (born 1983), Scottish songwriter

== See also ==
- Malcomson
