= Michael Malcolm (disambiguation) =

Michael Malcolm (born 1985) is an English footballer.

Michael Malcolm may also refer to:

== Baronets ==
- Sir Michael Malcolm, 3rd Baronet (died 1793), of the Malcolm baronets
- Sir Michael Malcolm, 6th Baronet (died 1828), of the Malcolm baronets
- Sir Michael Albert James Malcolm, 10th Baronet (1898–1976), of the Malcolm baronets

== Others ==
- Michael Malcolm, British actor in the Doctor Who story Frontios
- Mike Malcolm, founder of NetApp and Blue Coat Systems

== See also ==
- Malcolm Michael, Australian rules footballer
