= David Malcolm (disambiguation) =

David Malcolm (1938–2014) was Chief Justice of the Supreme Court of Western Australia 1988–2006

David Malcolm may also refer to:

- Sir David Peter Michael Malcolm, 11th Baronet (1919–1995) of the Malcolm Baronets
- Sheriff Dave Malcolm (died 1946), victim of George Sitts
