= Aram Andonian =

Armenian journalist, historian and writer

Aram Andonian Արամ Անտոնեան
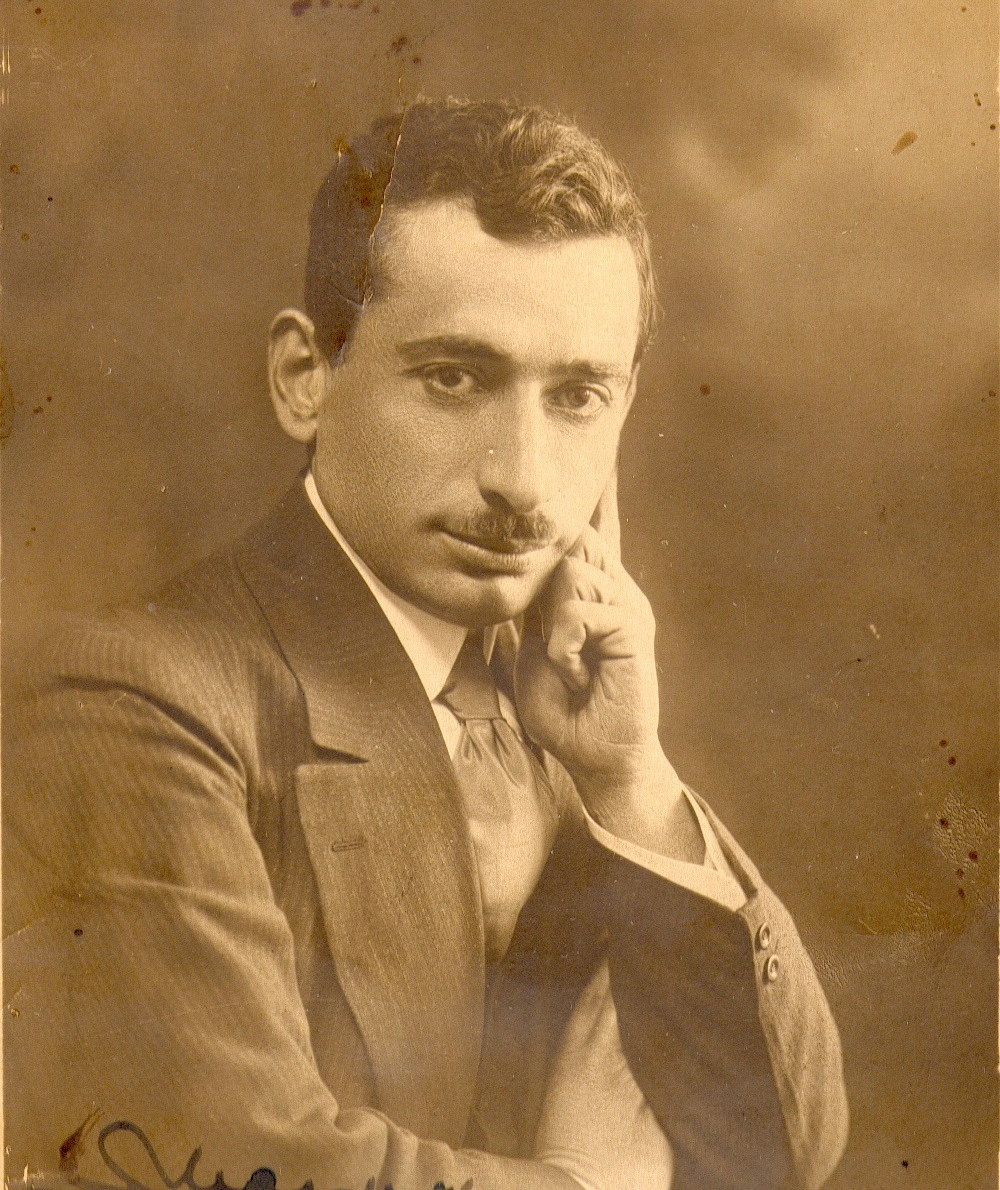
- Born: 1875; Constantinople, Ottoman Empire
- Died: 23 December 1951; Paris, France
- Occupations: Historian, editor, writer, public figure, drawer

Aram Andonian (Armenian: Արամ Անտոնեան; 1875 – 23 December 1951) was an Armenian journalist, historian and writer.

== Biography ==
Andonian was born in Constantinople and was ethnic Armenian. There he edited the Armenian journals Luys (Light) and Dzaghik (Flower) and the newspaper Surhandak (Herald). Andonian then went on to serve in the department of military censorship of the Ottoman Empire. He was arrested by order of interior minister Talat Pasha of the Ottoman Empire on the eve of 24 April 1915, and joined the large number of Armenian notables who were deported from the Ottoman capital. Andonian was deported to Chankiri, then, halfway there, returned to Ankara and was deported again to the camps in the Ra's al-'Ayn and Meskene. However, Andonian survived in Aleppo in the underground. When British forces occupied Aleppo, a lower-level Turkish official, Naim Bey collaborated with Aram Andonian in publishing his memoirs, an account of the deportation of the Armenians. The Memoirs of Naim Bey were published in 1920, and are sometimes referred to as the "Andonian Telegrams" or the "Talat Pasha Telegrams." The telegrams are purported to constitute direct evidence that the Armenian genocide of 1915–1917 was state policy of the Ottoman Empire. They were introduced as evidence in the trial of Soghomon Tehlirian.

According to Robert Melson, Andonian's report on post-1915 deportations and killings of Armenians are crucial for the research of that period.

From 1928 to 1951 Andonian directed the Nubarian Library in Paris, and succeeded in hiding and saving most of the collection during the German occupation of Paris. He also worked to collect eyewitness testimonies of the genocide.

He is the author of a Complete Illustrated History of the Balkan War (Vol. 1–5, 1912–1913), published originally in Armenian.

== Works ==
- Shirvanzade (Շիրվանզադէ), Constantinople, 1911. A biography of Alexander Shirvanzade.
- Badgerazart entartsag batmutiun Balkanyan baderazmin (Պատկերազարդ ընդարձակ պատմութիւն Պալքանեան պատերազմին (Complete Illustrated History of the Balkan War)), 5 vols., Constantinople, 1912-1913. Published in Turkish translation as Balkan Savaşı, Istanbul: Aras Yayincilik, 1999 (1st ed.).
- Ayn sev orerun (Այն սեւ օրերուն (In Those Dark Days)), Boston, 1919.
- Medz Vojire (Մեծ Ոճիրը (The Great Crime)), Boston, 1921 (English translation by Simon Beugekian, editor Taner Akçam, 2026).
- The Memoirs of Naim Bey, London, 1920.

== See also ==
- Deportation of Armenian intellectuals on 24 April 1915
