= Andrew Malcolm =

Andrew Malcolm may refer to:

- Andrew Malcolm (politician), Scottish-born manufacturer and political figure in Ontario
- Andrew Malcolm (author), British author and campaigner
- Andrew George Malcolm Irish physician and medical historian
- Andy Malcolm, English footballer
