= John Malcolm (surgeon) =

English surgeon, hydrotherapist, and activist (1814–1895)

- Born: 1814 (aged 81); Haughton-le-Skerne, England
- Died: 16 June 1895; Gainford, England
- Education: London Hospital Medical College; University of Edinburgh Medical School
- Occupations: Surgeon; hydrotherapist; activist

John Malcolm (1814 – 16 June 1895) was an English surgeon, hydrotherapist, and activist. He was an advocate for hydrotherapy and vegetarianism, serving as a vice president of the Vegetarian Society.

== Biography ==
Malcolm was born at Haughton-le-Skerne in 1814. He was the youngest son of Major John Malcolm. He studied at the London Hospital Medical College and University of Edinburgh Medical School. He qualified MRCS in 1836 and FRCS in 1858. He was a surgeon at Kirkleatham, Haughton, Darlington, and Gainford.

Malcolm worked in England, Germany and South Africa. He was resident physician at Bowness Hydropathic Establishment in Windermere for many years. Malcolm became a vegetarian in 1847 and was a vice-president of the Vegetarian Society. He also contributed to The Vegetarian Messenger. Malcolm believed that hydropathy combined with a vegetarian diet could be used to treat disease.

Malcom died on 16 June 1895 at Gainford, at the age of 81.
