= John Malcolm (footballer) =

Scottish footballer (1917–2009)

Personal information
- Full name: John Moore Malcolm
- Date of birth: 20 May 1917
- Place of birth: Clackmannan, Scotland
- Date of death: 14 January 2009 (aged 91)
- Position: Wing half

Senior career*
Years	Team	Apps	(Gls)
1946–1947	Accrington Stanley	25	(0)
1947–1948	Tranmere Rovers	22	(0)
Total		47	(0)
- * Club domestic league appearances and goals

John Moore Malcolm (20 May 1917 – 14 January 2009) was a Scottish footballer, who played as a wing half in the Football League for Accrington Stanley and Tranmere Rovers.
