= George Malcolm =

George Malcolm may refer to:

- George Alexander Malcolm (1810–1888), British Army officer
- George Malcolm (Indian Army officer) (1818–1897), officer in the Bombay Army and British East India Company
- George Malcolm (politician) (1865–1931), politician in Manitoba, Canada
- George A. Malcolm (1881–1961), American lawyer and judge in the Philippines
- George Malcolm (footballer) (1889–1965), English footballer
- George Malcolm (musician) (1917–1997), English harpsichordist, organist and conductor
- George D. Malcolm, Australian producer, cameraman and executive
