= Ian Malcolm =

Ian Malcolm may refer to:

- Ian Malcolm (Jurassic Park), fictional mathematician from the Jurassic Park series
- Sir Ian Malcolm (politician) (1868–1944), British member of Parliament, clan chieftain
