= Anahide Ter Minassian =

French historian (1929–2019)

- fair use image only
- Born: Anahide Kévonian; 26 August 1929; Paris, France
- Died: 11 February 2019 (aged 89); Fresnes, France
- Occupations: historian, writer
- Known for: Modern Armenian history
- Spouse: Leon Ter Minassian
- Children: 4

Anahide Ter Minassian born Anahide Kévonian (26 August 1929 – 11 February 2019) was a French historian of Armenian origin who specialised in modern Armenian history, particularly the pre- and post-Soviet period of Armenian history, and the Armenian revolutionary movement.

== Life ==
Ter Minassian was born in Paris in 1929. Her stateless Armenian parents were Levon Kévonian and Armenouhie Der-Garabédian, who taught her Armenian and refused to send her to a French school until she was seven. She would in time marry the son of Armenian statesman Ruben Ter-Minasian, Leon Ter Minassian, who was also a stateless Armenian. They had four children, including historian Taline Ter Minassian.

She went to the Sorbonne where she studied History and Geography and she became a lecturer at the École des Hautes Etudes en Sciences Sociales and at Paris I University. In 1969 she went to work at the Sorbonne.

After 40 years of service, she was made a knight of the légion d'honneur in 2015.

Ter Minassian died in Fresnes in 2019. In 2020 a book of Vahé Oshagan's poetry, "Onction", was published in French. His poetry had been translated from Armenian by Ter Minassian.

Anahide Ter Minassian's younger brother, Kéram Kévonian (born 1942), is also a specialist in Armenian history.

== Works ==
- La Question Arménienne (Marseille, 1983)
- Nationalism and Socialism in the Armenian Revolutionary Movement (1887-1912) (Cambridge, Mass., 1984)
- 1918-1920-La République d’Arménie (Bruxelles, 1989, 2006)
- Histoires croisées: diaspora, Arménie, Transcaucasie (Marseille, 1997)
- Smyrne, la ville oubliée?: mémoires d’un grand port ottoman, 1830-1930 (editions Autrement, 2006)
- Nos terres d’enfance, l’Arménie des souvenirs, avec Houri Varjabédian (Marseille, 2010)
