= Victory Services Club =

Private members club and registered charity in London, England

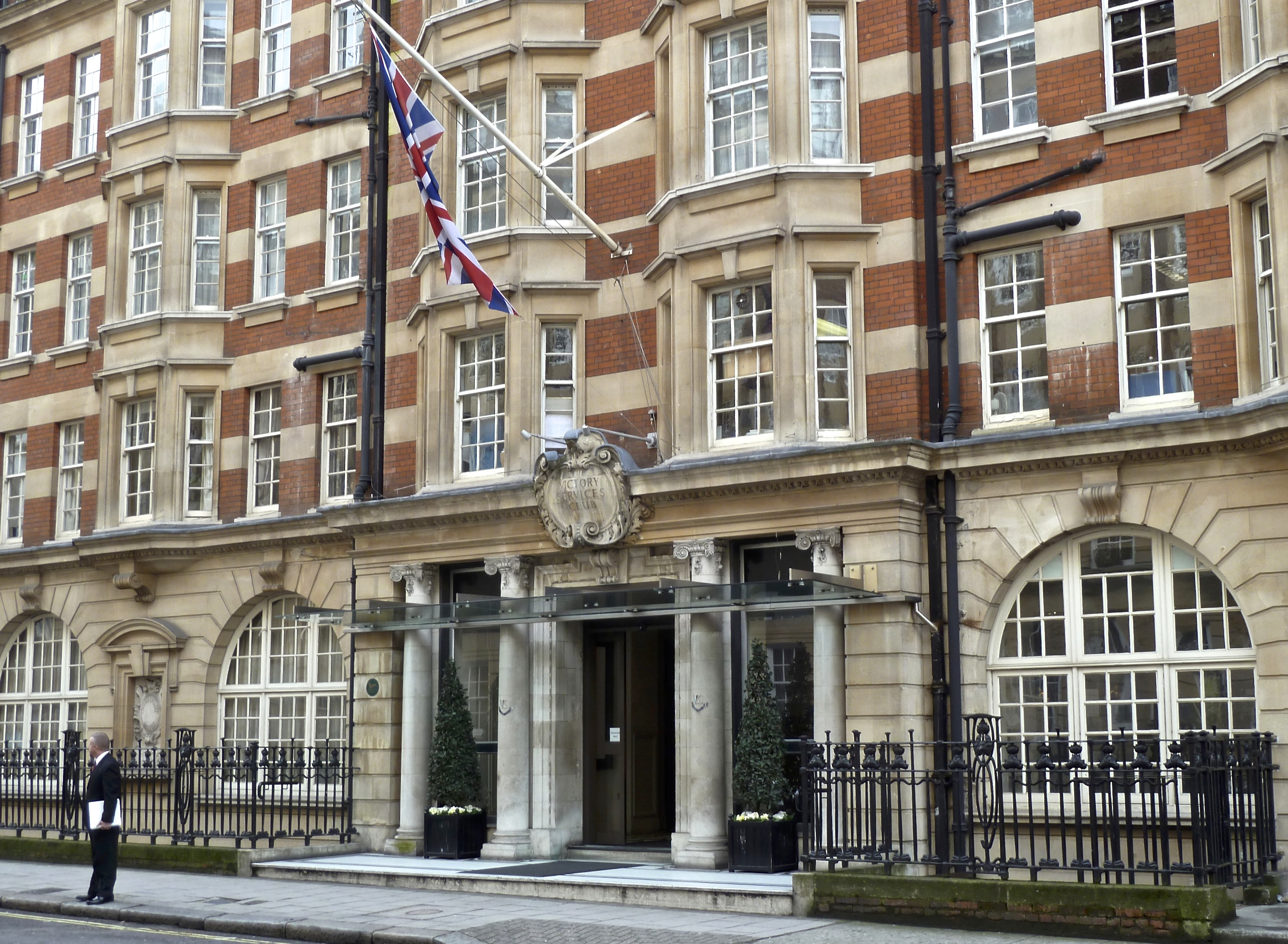
- Formation: 1907 (119 years ago)
- Purpose: Private Members Club
- Location: 63-79 Seymour Street, London
- Members: All serving and former members of British, Commonwealth, and NATO Armed Forces, and their families
- Key people: Queen Camilla (Patron-in-Chief)
- Website: www.vsc.co.uk

The Victory Services Club (VSC) is a private members club and registered charity in London, England for retired, veteran, serving members and immediate family members of the British Armed Forces as well as Commonwealth and NATO armed forces, including the UK and US. Membership is open to all ranks of British, Commonwealth and NATO's armies, navies, marines and air forces.

Located near Marble Arch and Connaught Square, the club provides lodging, dining services and conference facilities to members.

== History ==
The club was founded by Major Arthur Haggard, brother of the author H. Rider Haggard, as the Veterans' Association in 1907, providing services to retired members of the armed forces.

The club was renamed in 1936 in memory of Field Marshal Viscount Edmund Allenby, who had been President since 1933. After the Second World War, it became the Victory Ex-Services Club.

In 1948, the club moved from its earlier home in Holborn to its current larger premises in a building used by American forces during the Second World War. The accommodation was extended, with construction starting in 1954 on an adjacent site, and the Memorial Wing being opened by Prime Minister Winston Churchill in 1956.

With membership still limited to retired servicemen and immediate family, the club assumed the present name in 1970, when membership was opened to serving personnel and families.

On 11 October 1974 at around 10:30 pm the club, and the Army and Navy Club, were bombed by the Provisional Irish Republican Army's London based active service unit, injuring one person.

Its patrons have included General Dwight D. Eisenhower, Winston Churchill and Clement Attlee. In 2014 Camilla, Duchess of Cornwall became patron.

== Membership ==
Membership in the Victory Services Club is open to all ranks of the four British armed services and of the NATO members' forces, both active and retired, widows and widowers of British armed services, as well as Commonwealth personnel, and parents and children (over 18) of serving and ex-serving personnel. Members can invite as many as four guests to stay in the club, store luggage and receive the VSC's twice-yearly newsletter. There are also reciprocal arrangements available with affiliated clubs in Edinburgh, New York, San Francisco, Sydney, Canada, Malaysia and New Zealand.

== Accommodation ==
The Victory Services Club has been recognised by the Los Angeles Times, as offering suitable accommodation for military personnel on active duty and retired members of NATO's military forces.
