= Alexander Malcolm =

Alexander Malcolm may refer to:

- Alexander Malcolm (politician)
- Alexander Malcolm (writer on music)
- Alexander Malcolm (rugby union)
