= Boghos Nubar =

Armenian leader

Boghos Nubar Պօղոս Նուպար
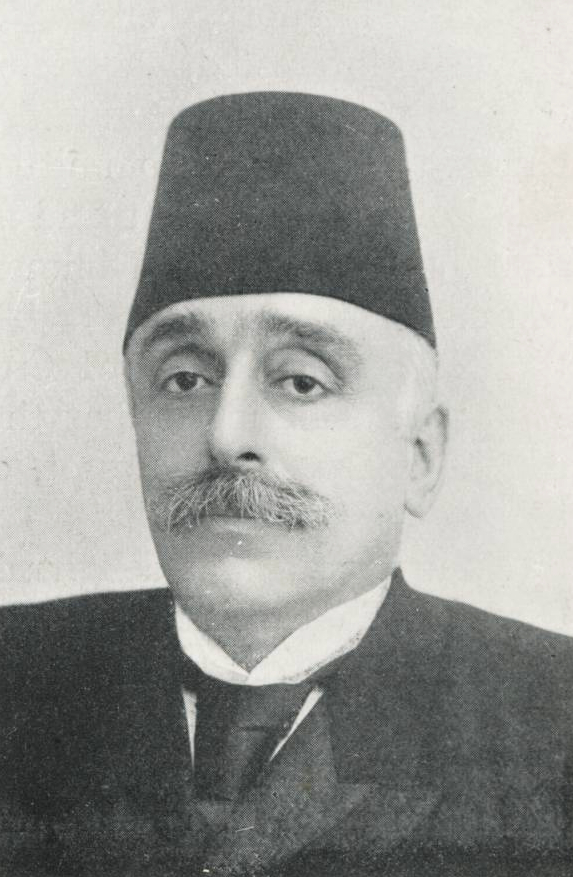
- Boghos Nubar in 1906.
- Born: 2 October 1851; Istanbul, Ottoman Empire
- Died: June 25, 1930 (aged 78); Paris, French Third Republic
- Resting place: Père Lachaise Cemetery
- Political party: none

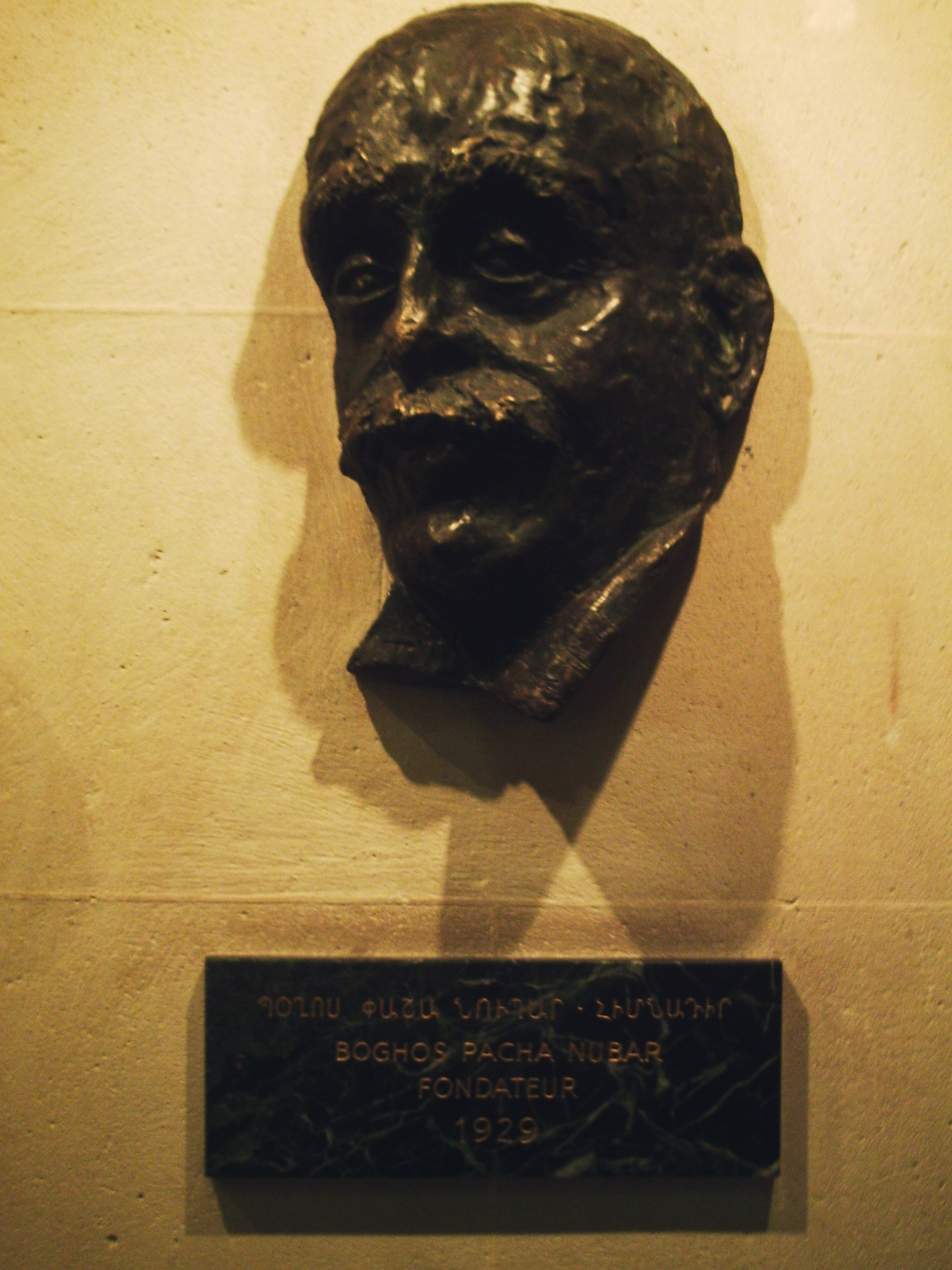
Boghos Nubar's bust in Paris. Sculpture by Raffy Sarkissian, 1974.

Boghos Nubar (Western Armenian: Պօղոս Նուպար), also known as Boghos Nubar Pasha (Պօղոս Նուպար Փաշա; 2 August 1851 – 25 June 1930), was an Armenian diplomat and philanthropist. He led the Armenian National Delegation, and was a founder of and first president of the Armenian General Benevolent Union (AGBU).

== Early life ==
Nubar was born in Istanbul in 1851. His father was Egyptian Prime Minister Nubar Pasha. He was educated in Egypt and France as a civil engineer, where he worked on irrigation projects in Egypt and Sudan. From 1905 onwards, he was involved in the development of the Cairene suburb Heliopolis (Masr El Gedida), as co-founder of the Heliopolis Oasis Company along with Belgian industrialist Édouard Empain.

== Career ==
As early as the beginning of 1912 the Catholicos of Etchmiadzin Gevork V had sent Boghos Nubar to the governments of Europe to lobby for administrative autonomy for Armenians in the Ottoman Empire.

Boghos Nubar, did not demand independence or amendments for the Armenian National Constitution, but to enforce the reforms called for in the Treaty of Berlin, which have remained a dead letter hitherto. In February 1914, the Armenian reform package, also known as the Yeniköy accord, was implemented: which created of two inspectorates in Ottoman Armenia placed under the supervision of two European inspectors general, who would be appointed to oversee matters related to the Armenian issues.

In January, 1919, The Times published a letter from Boghos Nubar (an Ottoman citizen) in which he protests, belatedly, about the non-representation of Armenians at the Paris Peace Conference. The letter includes a useful summary of the Armenian contribution to the allied war effort.

Our volunteers fought in the French Foreign Legion and covered themselves with glory. In the Légion d'Orient they numbered over 5,000 and made up more than half of the French contingent in Syria and Palestine, which took part in General Allenby's decisive victory.

In the Caucasus, without mentioning the 150,000 Armenians in the Russian Armies, about 50,000 Armenian volunteers under Andranik, Nazarbekoff and others, not only fought for four years for the Entente, but after the breakdown of Russia, they were the only forces in the Caucasus to resist the advance of the Ottoman Empire, whom they held in check until the Armistice was signed. They helped the British in Mesopotamia by preventing the ...

Boghos Nubar retired from politics in 1921 and died in Paris in 1930.

== Awards ==
- Boghos Nubar was awarded the Belgian "Ordre de Leopold" and Egyptian Medjidieh, Osmanieh and Nile Orders, honorary degrees and medals for distinguished services
- Officer of Legion of Honour
- Gold medal at the Paris International Exhibition (1900, for the invention of the tractor - mechanical plow)
- Gold medal of the Milan International Exhibition (1906)
