= 1914 Armenian reforms =

Reform plan devised by the European powers between 1912 and 1914

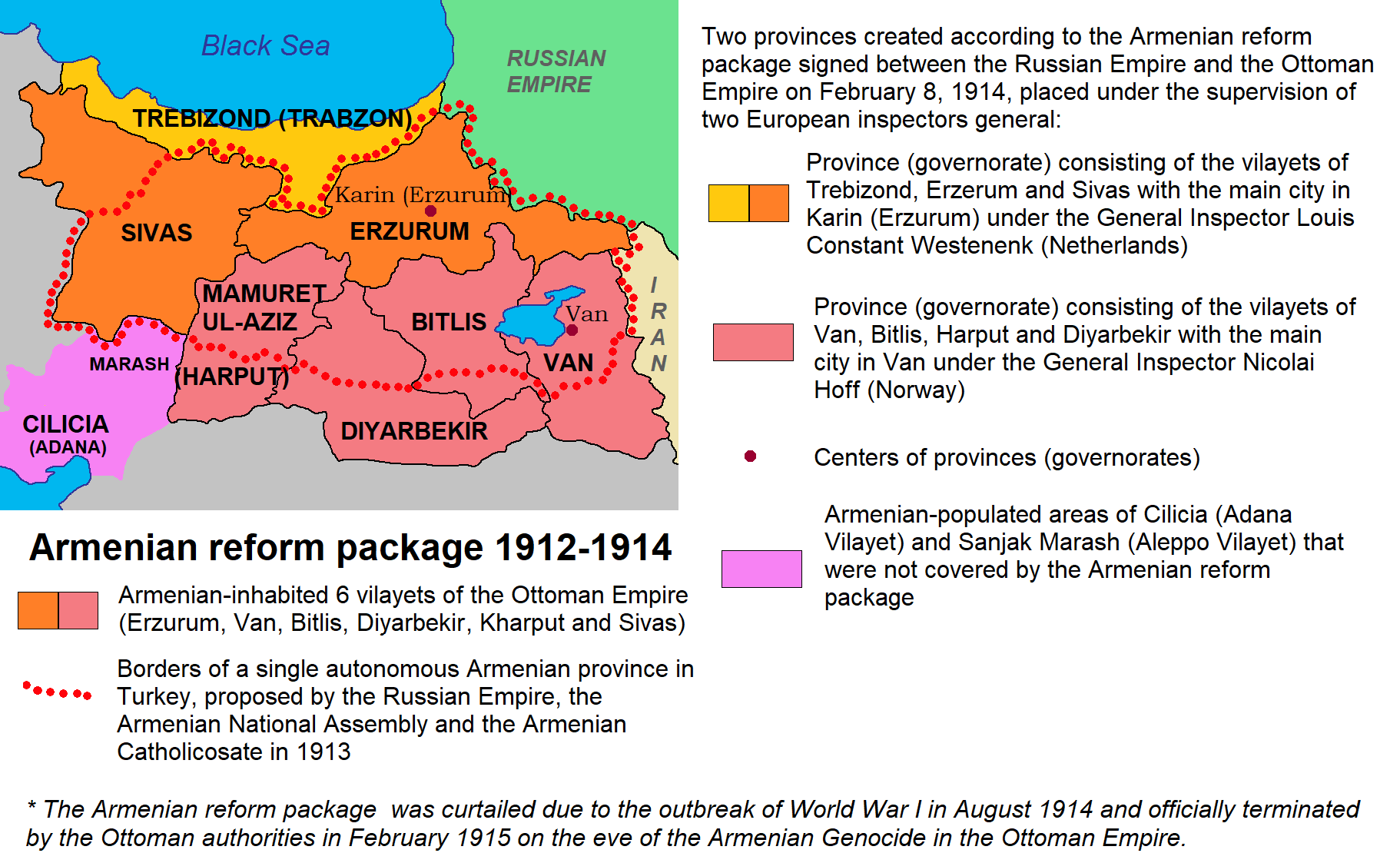
Administrative-territorial division of Turkish Armenia according to the final Draft of Armenian reforms in the Ottoman Empire, signed on February 8, 1914 by representatives of the Ottoman Empire and the Russian Empire and providing for the creation of 2 provinces (gouvernorats general) under the control of inspectors general appointed by the Great Powers..

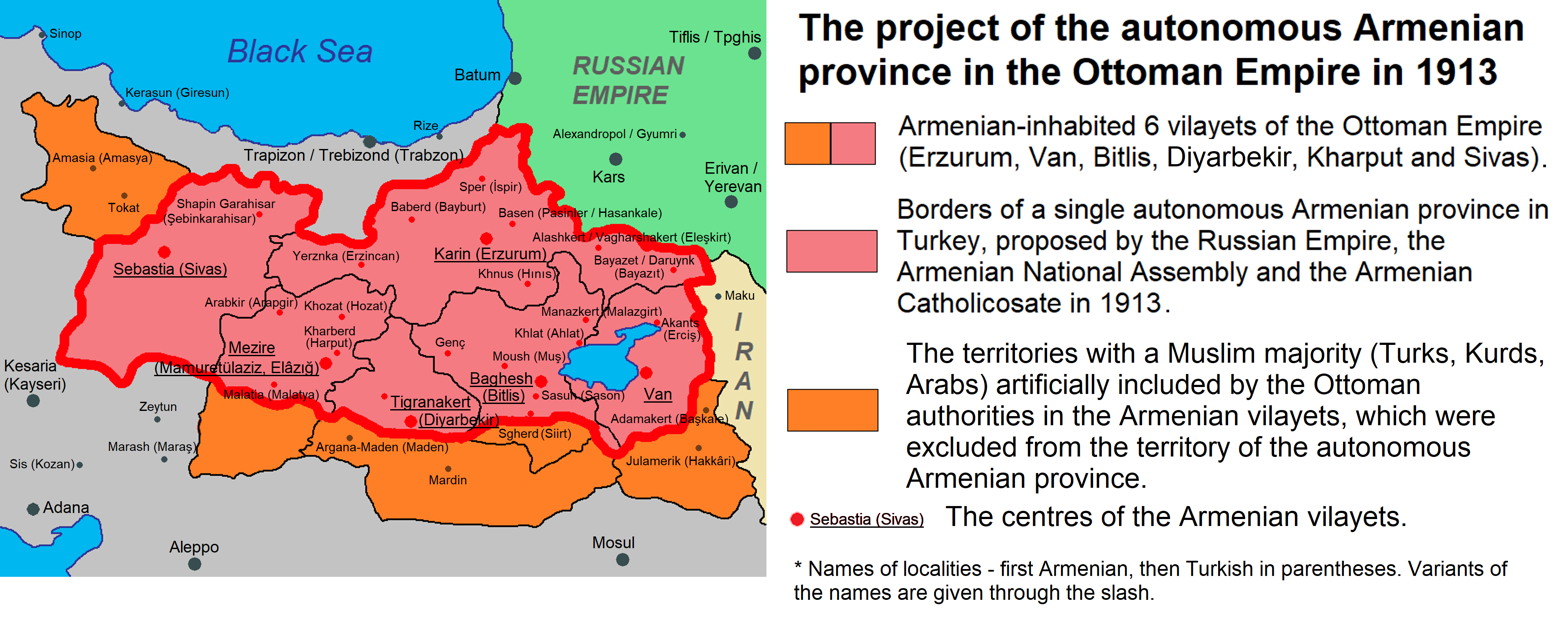
Autonomous Armenian province within the Ottoman Empire, proposed by the Russian Empire, the Armenian National Assembly and the Armenian Catholicosate in 1913.

The Armenian reforms, also known as the Yeniköy accord, was a reform plan devised by European powers between 1912 and 1914 that envisaged the creation of two provinces in Ottoman Armenia placed under the supervision of two European inspectors general, who would be appointed to oversee matters related to the Armenian issues. The inspectors general would hold the highest position in the six eastern vilayets (provinces), where the bulk of the Armenian population lived, and would reside at their respective posts in Erzurum and Van. The reform package was signed into law on February 8, 1914, though it was ultimately abolished on December 16, 1914, several weeks after Ottoman entry into World War I.

== Background ==
The Balkan Wars had created an opportunity for the revival of new plans to improve the conditions of the Ottoman Armenians which were persecuted. The French, British and Italians were anxious to limit German influence in the Ottoman Empire. In addition, the Russian government encouraged the Catholicos of Armenia to appeal through the viceroy of the Caucasus to the Ottoman government for intervention in favor of reforms in Armenian-inhabited vilayets. This project was prepared by André Mandelstam, the dragoman at the Russian Embassy in Istanbul, and representatives from the Armenian national assembly. It was introduced and discussed in Constantinople at a meeting of the ambassadors of France, Britain and Italy.

The project suggested the formation of a two large provinces from six vilayets (Erzurum, Van, Bitlis, Diyarbakır, Kharput and Sivas) under either an Ottoman Christian or a European governor general. The governor general was to be appointed by the Powers for the ensuing five years. Germany opposed the project and succeeded in obtaining significant modifications, including splitting the region into two provinces.

== Plan ==
The reform package was signed on February 8, 1914, between the Ottoman Empire (represented by Grand Vezir Said Halim Pasha) and Russia. Louis Constant Westenenk, an administrator for the Dutch East Indies, and Nicolai Hoff, a major in the Norwegian Army, were selected as the first two inspectors. Hoff was in Van when the war broke out, just as Westenenk was preparing to depart for his post in Erzurum.

Historian Margaret Lavinia Anderson states:

On the two demands existential for the Armenians— that muhacir not be settled in these seven provinces (which would make nonsense of proportional representation) and that measures be undertaken to return stolen lands to their original Armenian owners—the Porte remained adamant, and they went unmentioned in the Yeniköy accord. European negotiators were left with the hope that the two European inspector-generals stipulated in the accord might be able to adjudicate such problems.
