= Malcolm baronets =

Baronetcy in the Baronetage of Nova Scotia

The Malcolm Baronetcy, of Balbedie and Innertiel in the County of Fife, is a title in the Baronetage of Nova Scotia. It was created on 25 July 1665 for John Malcolm, subsequently Member of Parliament for Kinross-shire. He was the son of John Malcolm (1611–1692), of Balbedie, Lochore and Innertiel, a Member of the Scottish Parliament.

Alexander Malcolm, younger brother of the first Baronet, was a Senator of the College of Justice and Lord Justice Clerk under the judicial title of Lord Lochore.

== Malcolm baronets, of Balbedie and Innertiel (1666) ==
- Sir John Malcolm, 1st Baronet (1646–1729)
- Sir John Malcolm, 2nd Baronet (1681–1753)
- Sir Michael Malcolm, 3rd Baronet (died 1793)
- Sir James Malcolm, 4th Baronet (died 1805)
- Sir John Malcolm, 5th Baronet (1749–1816)
- Sir Michael Malcolm, 6th Baronet (died 1828)
- Sir John Malcolm, 7th Baronet (1828–1865)
- Sir James Malcolm, 8th Baronet (1823–1901)
- Sir James William Malcolm, 9th Baronet (1862–1927)
- Sir Michael Albert James Malcolm, 10th Baronet (1898–1976)
- Sir David Peter Michael Malcolm, 11th Baronet (1919–1995)
- Sir James William Thomas Alexander Malcolm, 12th Baronet (1930–2012)
- Sir Alexander James Elton Malcolm, 13th Baronet (born 1956)

The heir apparent is the present holder's son Edward Alexander Humpherus Malcolm (born 1984).

== See also ==
- Clan Malcolm
