= Causes of the Armenian genocide =

Differing views of what caused the Armenian genocide

A 1910 British ethnographic map of the Middle East; Armenians shown in green, Kurds in yellow, Turks in brown. Many explanations of the Armenian genocide focus on the CUP's desire to resolve the Armenian question by eliminating the Armenians.

Differing views of what caused the Armenian genocide include explanations focusing on nationalism, religion, and wartime radicalization and continue to be debated among scholars. In the twenty-first century, focus has shifted to multicausal explanations. Most historians agree that the genocide was not premeditated before World War I, but the role of contingency, ideology, and long-term structural factors in causing the genocide continues to be discussed.

== Historiography ==
Despite agreement about what happened during the Armenian genocide and who was responsible, there is still substantial differences of interpretation of the causes of the genocide and how it relates to prior anti-Armenian massacres. Bedross Der Matossian states that debates about cumulative radicalization, contingency, and premeditation are unanswerable until all archives, especially the Turkish ATASE archives, are opened to independent researchers. Different explanations of the genocide are not necessarily mutually exclusive. In the twenty-first century, research has shifted to focus on more nuanced, multicausal explanations. Many recent studies argue that the genocide was caused by a mixture of long-range and short-term factors, and balancing these has been central to the historiography. Studies also balance between objective causes as well as the subjective paranoia of the Committee of Union and Progress (CUP) leaders who ordered the genocide. Historian Hans-Lukas Kieser has highlighted the overlap between the regime's aims, stating, "Demographic policy, sovereignty issues and the safeguarding of a Turkish national home in Asia Minor were all closely linked."

The argument that the genocide was planned prior to World War I and that the war merely provided an opportunity to accomplish it—including such claims as the genocide being decided at the CUP's 1910 or 1911 congresses—predominated in early studies of the Armenian genocide but has since come to be discounted by most scholars. At the 1910 CUP congress, Mehmed Talat described non-Muslims as an "impenetrable barrier" to the desired "Ottomanizing [of] the Empire". Melson suggests that this could have been accomplished by means other than genocide, such as forced expulsion or assimilation. Bloxham and Göçek argue that although there was no plan for genocide before the war, "the future of the Armenians as a political community in the Ottoman Empire was very bleak". Historian Taner Akçam argues that "the Armenian genocide was less the product of wartime contingencies than of the empire's long-term structural problems".

Historians Donald Bloxham and Fatma Müge Göçek emphasize that understanding the underlying factors that led to genocide does not exonerate the leaders who chose it. Bloxham states that many Armenian genocide deniers have engaged in "abuse of context" in order to exculpate the Ottoman state. One line of argument, termed the "provocation thesis", holds that the genocide was an inevitable response to the provocations of Armenian revolutionaries, which are greatly exaggerated in such accounts. The international context has also been exaggerated to exonerate the CUP: for example Salahi Sonyel considering the Armenians "victims of European diplomacy" or Ersal Yavi stating that the Armenians' fate was only because they were "in the pincers of European imperialism". A third line of reasoning accuses Armenians of siding economically with European imperialists to the detriment of Muslim Ottomans, disregarding contrary evidence. Pushed to its logical extreme, this argument justifies the expropriation, boycotts, and even deportation of Armenians as a form of national self-defense against the minority oppressor.

== Religion and cultural explanations ==
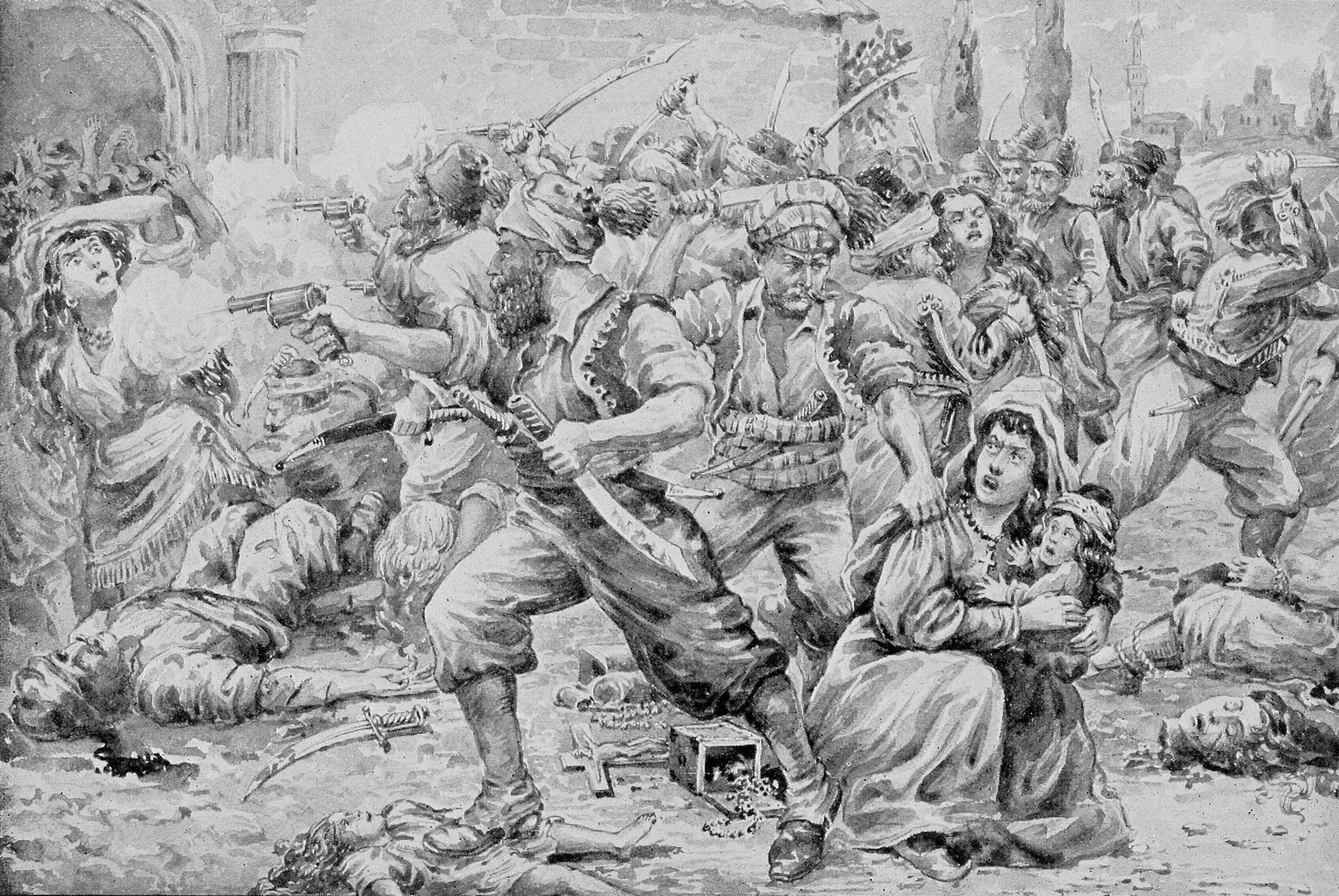
Eyewitness sketch of the 1894 Sasun massacres

Traditionally the Ottoman millet system offered non-Muslims a subordinate but protected place in society. The nineteenth-century Tanzimat reforms abolished the protections that members of the Armenian millet had previously enjoyed, but did not change the popular perception that they were different and inferior. In the 1890s, hundreds of thousands of Armenians were killed in the Hamidian massacres and in 1909, 17,000 were killed in the Adana massacre, and continued to be killed after World War I, during the Turkish War of Independence (1919–1923) despite vast differences in the ideology of the regime in power. One strand of historiography views the Armenian genocide as rooted in Islam or Ottoman culture and a continuation of these previous massacres.

Early studies on the genocide in Western scholarship focused on religion, particularly the work of Vahakn Dadrian, who argued that a "culture of violence" was inherent in the Ottoman theocratic system and that war only provided the opportunity for a genocide that CUP leaders already wanted to commit. Dadrian also argued that the Hamidian massacres were a less systematic precursor to the World War I genocide.

Donald Bloxham and Fatma Müge Göçek consider it "essentialist and therefore untenable" to blame the various anti-Armenian massacres on Islamic culture. Historian Ronald Grigor Suny and others have criticized this line of thinking, arguing that Dadrian fails to "explain why religion should have led to genocidal violence in the first year of the World War but not throughout Ottoman and Islamic history". According to historian Robert Melson, although elite motivations of enabling killing differed between the Hamidian massacres, Adana massacre, and Armenian genocide, there were always sufficient Ottoman Muslims willing to carry out the anti-Christian violence. He argues that such a predisposition for anti-Armenian violence already existed prior to 1915 and "it is probable that they were motivated by Ottoman and Muslim traditions of sectarian supremacy", among other potential motivations—but probably not nationalist ideology. On the other hand, Suny argues that genocide is initiated by an elite and requires popular acquiescence, but not necessarily active participation from the many as "a few killers can cause enormous destruction".

The 2019 book The Thirty-Year Genocide: Turkey's Destruction of Its Christian Minorities, 1894–1924 revived the focus on religion as a cause of genocide, and specifically arguments used by Dadrian, arguing that the Ottoman Empire and Turkish republic carried out a thirty-year-long genocidal project to replace Christians with Muslims in Anatolia. The book's conclusions have proved controversial among scholars. Reviewing the book, Mark Levene suggested that "the exterminatory violence of this period can be best explained not through a traditionally religious prism" but instead by the breakdown of the traditional millet system under the pressure of geopolitics and nationalism.

== Territorial losses and refugee crisis ==
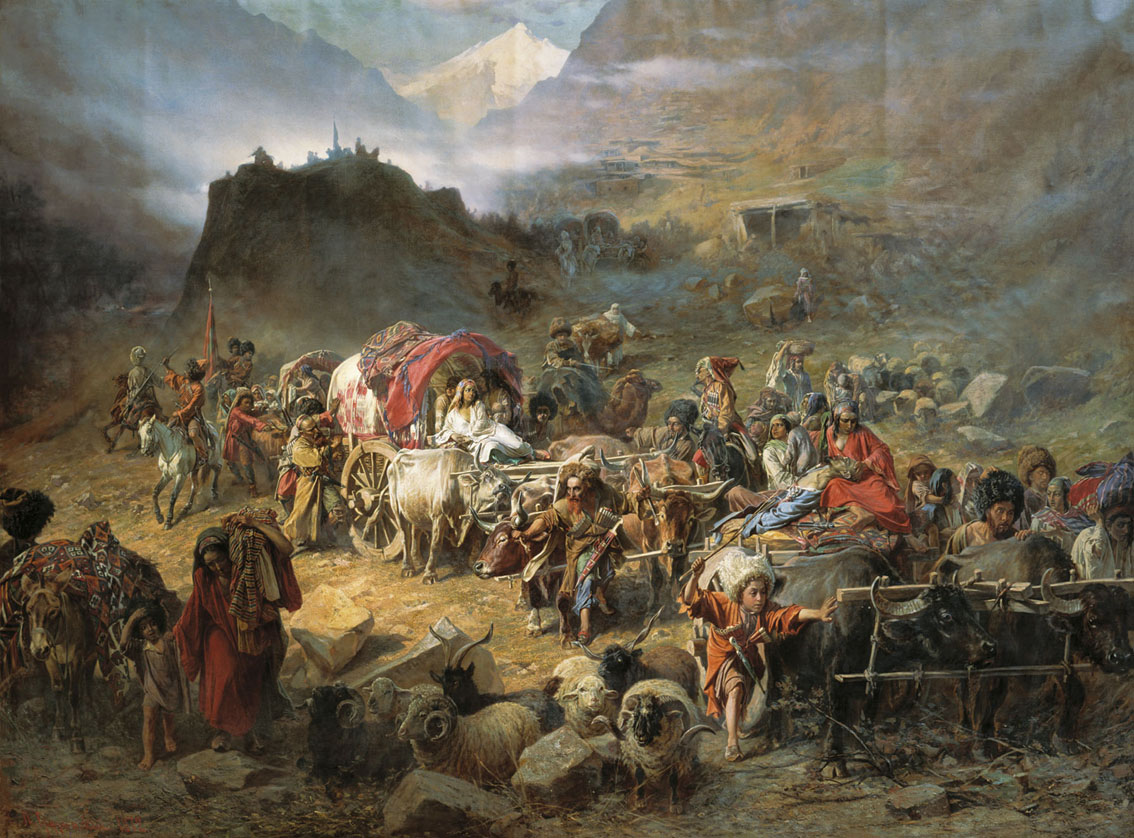
Circassians leaving their native village in the Caucasus. Circassians were later noted for their role as perpetrators during the Armenian genocide.

The Ottoman Empire lost sixty percent of its territory during the nineteenth century, followed by a loss of 80% of its European territory after the Balkan Wars. Such losses led to an opinion among the CUP that the empire was facing existential crisis.

Beginning in the mid-nineteenth century but especially after the Great Eastern Crisis in the mid-1870s, millions of Muslim refugees poured into the Ottoman Empire after being ethnically cleansed, mostly from the Caucasus and the Balkans. The Directorate for the Settlement of Tribes and Immigrants (IANM), which later played an important role organizing deportations during the Armenian genocide, was initially established to help resettle refugees from the Balkan Wars. Kieser and Bloxham state that the IANM and role of migrants as perpetrators indicate "some sort of transmission belt of anti-civilian, state-minority violence across boundaries". In the eyes of the CUP, Armenians bore collective guilt for the actions of Christians throughout the nineteenth century against the Ottoman state.

=== Balkan Wars ===
Recapture of Edirne during the Second Balkan War was pushed by radicals within the CUP, especially Talat, and strengthened their faction. During the Balkan Wars, many ethnic Bulgarian and Greek soldiers in the Ottoman army defected. The stunning defeat led to a deep sense of national humiliation. Those Muslims who fled or were driven out of the Balkans were the raw material needed by the CUP to restructure the demographics of Anatolia in favor of Muslims. They were resettled on land expropriated from Christians who were killed or deported.

It is widely accepted that the Balkan Wars put an end to Ottomanism, the movement for pluralism and coexistence within the empire. Instead, the CUP turned to an increasingly radical ideology of Turkish nationalism to preserve the empire. Analogies with the Balkans led to an increasing anti-Armenian positioning within the CUP around 1913, as ethnic and religious pluralism was increasingly viewed as a dangerous liability. According to Bloxham and Göçek, although a causal connection between the Balkan Wars and the Armenian genocide is not proven, ethnic cleansing of Balkan Muslims may have provided a model for handling populations considered a problem.

Historian Uğur Ümit Üngör argues that "the involvement of seasoned criminals and militiamen hardened in years of (low-intensity) conflict in the Balkans, accounts for the cruelty of the genocide".

== Armenian question ==
The Ottoman Empire lost the Russo-Turkish War of 1877–1878 and was forced to cede parts of the Balkans and Caucasus, as well as Ottoman Cyprus. At the 1878 Congress of Berlin, the Ottoman government agreed to carry out reforms and guarantee the physical safety of its Armenian subjects, but there was no enforcement mechanism; conditions continued to worsen. This marked the emergence of the Armenian question in international diplomacy as Armenians were for the first time used to interfere in Ottoman politics. Although Armenians had been called the "loyal millet" (millet-i sadıka) in contrast to Greeks and others who had previously challenged Ottoman rule, after 1878 Armenians became perceived as subversive and ungrateful.

Because of the territorial losses from the war, Sultan Abdul Hamid II decided that the Tanzimat reforms were a failure. Worried that they would lead to increased foreign influence or the creation of an autonomous region—as occurred in the Balkans—Abdul Hamid blocked the implementation of Armenian reforms. Instead, he focused on uniting the Muslims in the empire under pan-Islamic policies. Abdul Hamid created the Hamidiye regiments in the 1890s from Kurdish tribes; these were given free rein to commit violence against Armenians with impunity. In 1895, another European reform proposal was shelved after widespread anti-Armenian massacres that killed at least 80,000 Armenians. Akçam considers that "the Armenian genocide was driven by the traumatic memories of the nineteenth century's reform-massacre dynamic."

Akçam has focused on the 1914 Armenian reforms as the main motivator for the CUP to seek a permanent solution to the Armenian question, as opposed to military exigencies. After the Young Turk Revolution, Armenian leaders sought reforms within the framework of Ottoman constitutionalism, but when this proved unfruitful, turned to other countries in order to push through reforms. In the context of reform in the Ottoman law making system after 1908, Kurdish MPs would block every reform attempt presented in parliament. The CUP agreed to the February 1914 reforms under heavy international pressure, suspended them in August/September 1914, and finally abrogated them in January 1915. The CUP viewed these reforms as a threat to the state believing that they could lead to partition. Historian Margaret Lavinia Anderson argues that analogies with Balkan separatism are inappropriate, and that if their lives and property were guaranteed, any possible alternatives to Ottoman rule would not have been attractive to Armenians. Kieser argues that the reading that sees the reform agreement as destined to lead to partition of the empire confuses the CUP leaders' fears with reality. However, Kieser agrees the Armenian insistence on international monitoring of the reform agreement—a red line for the CUP—led to a breakdown in relations. According to Zürcher, the background of the CUP leadership in Macedonia led them to misunderstand the situation in Anatolia.

There is a consensus among historians that the aim of the Armenian genocide was to reduce the Armenian population of the empire to no more than 5 to 10 percent in any area. This reduction in population was deemed necessary to prevent Armenians from ever being able to form their own state or autonomous region. In 1915, Talat Pasha, the main perpetrator of the genocide, sent a telegram stating that the mass deportation of Armenians was intended to be the "definitive solution to the Armenian Question" This action was pre-emptive and occurred before Armenians tried to secede from the empire. Separatism only became popular among Armenians after the genocide.

One key reason for the CUP deciding to commit genocide against Ottoman Armenians was its mistaken belief that Russia sought to annex Western Armenia. In fact, Russia wanted the six vilayets of Western Armenia to remain under Ottoman sovereignty and considered these areas devoid of strategic value.

== Nationalism and ideology ==
In the decades leading up to World War I, nationalism rose among both the Young Turks as well as Armenians, further widening the gap between Muslim and Armenian inhabitants of the empire. Following the failure of reform efforts, a few Armenians joined revolutionary political parties, of which the most influential was the Dashnaktsutyun (Armenian Revolutionary Federation). While the Dashnaks believed constitutionalism would improve conditions within the empire, the Hntchak party proposed an independent state in eastern Anatolia. The historian Mark Levene argues that Armenian insurrectionary politics should be acknowledged without treating them as justification for the genocide. Bloxham believes that Armenian nationalism played a role in shaping the empire's responses to it, but emphasizes that the Ottoman leaders rejected alternative courses of action.

During the Hamidian era, Ottoman bureaucratic correspondence increasingly portrayed Armenians as security threats using labels such as "vagrant", "anarchist", fesad or müfsid ("villain" or "evildoer"), and şaki ("bandit"), while by 1915 the Young Turks were describing Armenians as "internal enemies" and traitors allegedly allied with Russia and the Entente. Although "fifth column" was not contemporary Ottoman terminology, modern historians frequently employ it retrospectively to characterize this perception of Armenians as an internal population serving foreign enemies.

After the Young Turk Revolution, during the Second Constitutional Era, the ARF was part of the CUP's coalition and were supporters of the Ottoman imperial system. Before the Young Turk Revolution, the ARF controlled its own paramilitaries which protected Armenians from marauding Kurdish tribesmen and launching periodic uprisings in Ottoman-controlled Western Armenia. Armenian political groups located within Russian-controlled Eastern Armenia also engaged in militancy against the Tsar's policies of Russification between 1903 and 1912.

Bloxham considers perpetrators' ideology, in this case Turkish nationalism, to be "the most important element in genocide". Ziya Gökalp, the most influential ideologue of Turkish nationalism, regarded Ottoman Greeks, Armenians and Jews as undesirable "foreigners" and is considered to have contributed to the genocide through his ideas. Through its emphasis on a primordial ethnicity and rejection of minority rights and individual rights, Turkish nationalism bore similarities to the German Völkisch movement, pan-Slavism, and racism. Some in the CUP were atheists embraced Social Darwinism which according to Bloxham provided a key ideological justification for genocide.

In his 2005 book The Great Game of Genocide, Bloxham argued that the Armenian genocide was "an archetypical example of a nationalist genocide", and it "represents a clear logic of ethnic nationalism when carried to its absolute extreme in multinational societies". Kévorkian argues, "The physical destruction of the Armenian population...was conceived as a necessary condition for the construction of a Turkish nation-state—the supreme objective of the Young Turks." According to Melson, Turkish nationalism has been fingered as a contributing factor in the genocide by every historian writing on it. Suny argues that the CUP never subscribed to a pure Turkish nationalist ideology and that its ultimate goal was preserving the Ottoman Empire. Akçam states that "From the moment the Unionists took power, they saw their first duty as saving the empire from extinction." During World War I, they came to identify the Armenians as an existential threat, leading to the policy of genocide.

== Economic factors ==
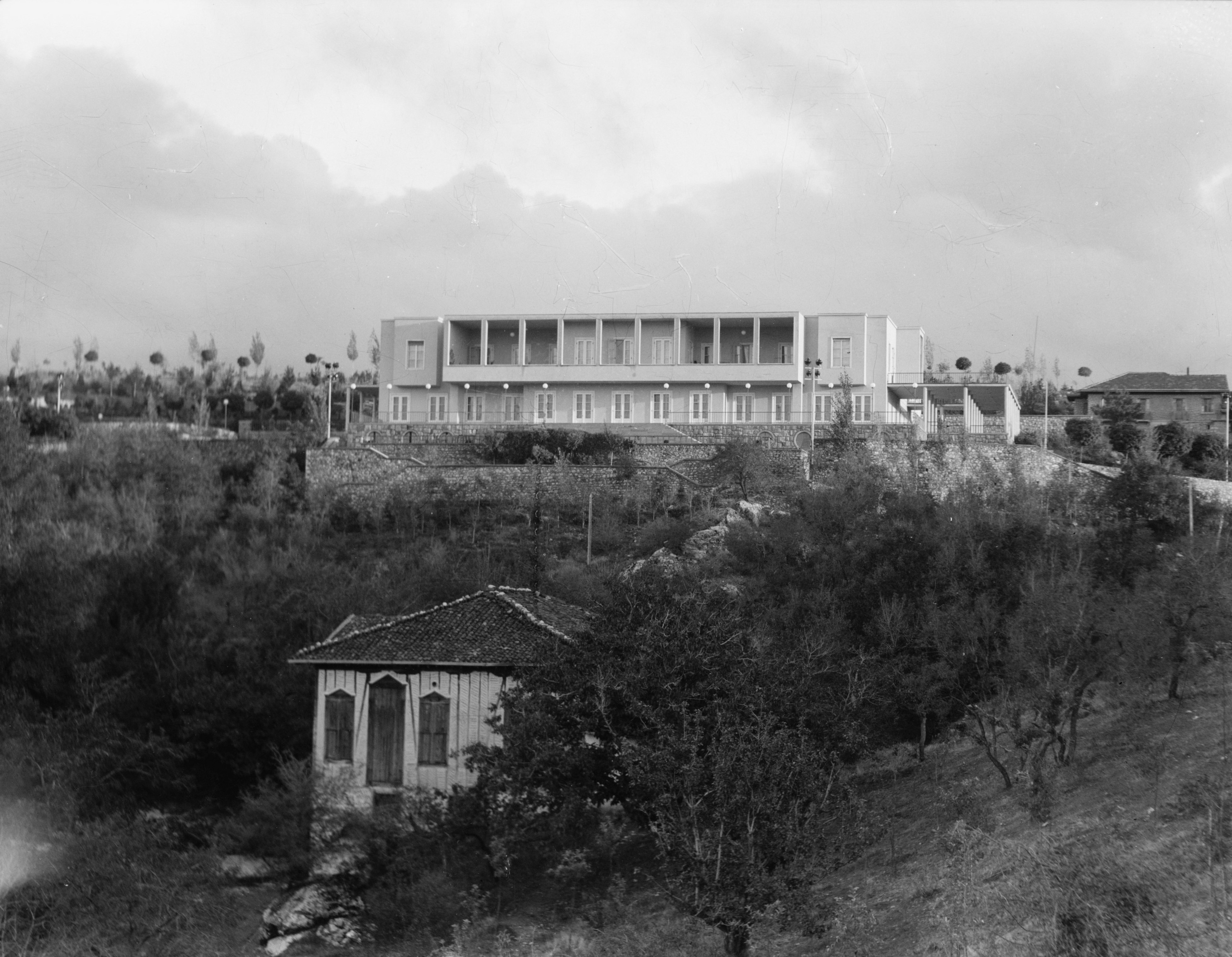
Çankaya Mansion, the official residence of the president of Turkey, was confiscated from Ohannes Kasabian in 1915 during the Ottoman period.

Although 70-80% of Armenians in the Ottoman Empire were peasants engaged in small scale subsistence agriculture, they were overrepresented in commerce. As middleman minorities, there was a great disparity between wealth of some Armenians and the overall political power of the group, making them especially vulnerable. Observers labeled the Armenians "Jews of the Orient", and they became the focus of economic resentments similar to those against European Jews. The opportunity for material gain in the form of property and land formerly belonging to Armenians was a crucial motivation for many perpetrators.

The theory of national economy pioneered by the German Friedrich List was applied both to the Ottoman Empire and European countries where it was considered desirable to eliminate non-favored ethnic groups from the economy and replace them with those considered trustworthy. Initially members of the CUP advocated for boycotts against goods from non-Muslim merchants, primarily European Jews and Ottoman Christians. Later assets held by foreign entities and native Christians were confiscated and redistributed to Muslims. The theft of property held by Christians was an integral part of the Armenian genocide and expulsion of Greeks; however, economic factors were secondary to the Young Turks’ primary nationalist objectives of eliminating Armenian demands for autonomy and preserving Ottoman territorial integrity, although the confiscation of Armenian wealth and property also served to strengthen the emerging Turkish bourgeoisie.

== Committee of Union and Progress ==
As with other genocides, it is accepted that the Armenian genocide was organized by the political leadership rather than starting spontaneously. The ruling party during the genocide was the Committee of Union and Progress (CUP), a secret revolutionary organization that originated in the Macedonian Struggle between different nationalists over the future of Macedonia. The CUP first came to power in the 1908 Young Turk Revolution, which had support from Armenians as well as Turks. Akçam and other historians argue that initially, the CUP attempted to preserve the empire through reforms and only turned to extreme policies after a series of crises pushed them to an increasingly radical Turkish nationalism.

In 1914, the CUP secretly organized a large-scale ethnic cleansing campaign against Ottoman Greeks living on the Aegean coast of Anatolia. Similar to the Armenians, the affected Greeks lived in a strategic area considered a possible location for Allied invasion and were accused of disloyalty to the state. In his memoirs, United States ambassador Henry Morgenthau, Sr. states that "the Turks had expelled the Greeks so successfully that they had decided to apply the same method to all the other races in the empire". Historian Matthias Bjørnlund states that the perceived "success" of the Greek deportation "meant that even more radical measures could be seen as not only possible, but as yet another extension of a policy of social engineering through Turkification". At the same time, plans were underway to deport and resettle other populations in the empire.

== Wartime radicalization ==
According to one view, the CUP entered World War I to roll back Ottoman losses and impose a radical solution to its perceived minority problems. However, the CUP was reluctant to enter the war and put off its entry in hopes that the war would end first. Suny states that if the Ottoman Empire had not entered the war on the side of the Triple Alliance, "in all likelihood there would have been no Armenian Genocide". Yektan Turkyilmaz proposed that if the war occurred one or two years later, after the reforms had been implemented, "it is very possible that the persecution, forced deportation and extermination of Ottoman Armenians would not have been viewed as easy an option".

Bloxham was the first to propose, in 2003, that the genocide emerged from a process of cumulative radicalization during the war: in other words, that genocide was not decided during a single meeting during one day but evolved over time. The concept of cumulative radicalization was developed to explain how relations between perpetrators and victims deteriorate and genocide is driven forward by local conditions and factors. According to this approach, supported by members of the Workshop for Armenian/Turkish Scholarship, genocide emerged gradually from the March 1915 decree for limited deportation of Armenians from militarily sensitive areas.

War enabled the CUP to shut down the Ottoman Parliament and strictly control information.

The eastern provinces of the Ottoman Empire that comprised Western Armenia was a security concern for the CUP, as it was feared that the Armenian residents would collaborate with Russia. This fear prompted the Ottomans to send representatives to the Armenian congress held at Erzurum in 1914, during which the Ottomans appealed to the Armenians to initiate an insurrection from within the Russian Empire. Suny states that the various repressive measures taken against Armenians by the Ottoman government provoked the very resistance that they intended to quell.

The question of when the perpetrators decided to commit genocide is important to this discussion as it indicates what circumstances led to the decision. Most historians argue that the final decision to commit the genocide was made in late March or mid-April 1915. Akçam argues that, while the decision was a process, the final decision had already been made prior to 3 March. Citing the killings of Russian Armenians during the Caucasus campaign at the end of 1914, historian Candan Badem states "the decision was probably taken even before the Ottoman disaster at Sarıkamış" in early 1915. Bloxham considers that a policy of total deportation did not fully emerge until the early summer and even deportation did not necessarily mean a decision to kill the Armenians, at least not initially.

=== Invasion of Russia and Persia ===
Relevant locations

Batum, Ardahan, and Kars had been won by Russia in the Russo-Turkish War of 1877–1878, although Russia had no desire for additional territory in Eastern Anatolia in 1914. Although the Russian administration did not favor Armenians, the Kars area become home to significant cross-border Dashnak activism. Both the Ottoman Empire and Russian Empire sent agents across the border to gather intelligence. Although Ottoman agents were gathering military intelligence prior to the formation of the paramilitary Special Organization, that organization quickly took over the role of fighting a cold war against the Russian Empire. As early as 12 September 1914, Talat explored the possibility of recruiting convicted criminals to work for the war effort, which was put into operation in November. Released criminals joined çetes operating in the eastern borderlands. More than ten thousand convicts were released to join the Special Organization and the organization also recruited many tribesmen, especially Circassians and Kurds. Operating independently from the regular army, the Special Organization was available for attacks against civilians.

The same day as the German–Ottoman alliance was concluded on 2 August 1914, the CUP decided to use the Special Organization guerrilla warfare in neutral northeastern Iran and the Russian Caucasus. The Ottoman Empire (especially Enver, who was considered to harbor irredentist aspirations as far away as Turkestan and Afghanistan) hoped to win over Caucasian Muslims to their cause. A few days later, the CUP sent a delegation to a Dashnak conference, offering an autonomous Armenian region if the Dashnaks incited a pro-Ottoman revolt in Russia in the event of war. The Armenians refused, instead resolving that Armenians on both sides of the border should fight for the countries of which they were citizens. Armenian representatives in Erzurum rejected a similar offer in early 1915. After general Ottoman mobilization began, Armenians were declared a suspect national group.

As the front moved back and forth in 1914 and early 1915, the first major massacres of Armenians and other Christians took place. The head of the Special Organization, Bahaeddin Şakir, spent mid-December 1914 to mid-February 1915 in the vicinity of Ottoman-occupied Artvin and Ardahan in the Caucasus. At the end of December there were killings of Russian Armenians in and around Ardanuç and Ardahan, while these areas were held by Special Organization forces led by Şakir and Yakub Cemil. Badem characterizes the massacres as "near-genocidal". Despite opposition from the Russian authorities, some Armenians who returned with Russian forces in 1915 committed reprisal attacks.

In September, Ömer Naji with 700 men invaded northwestern Qajar Iran, a neutral country whose northwestern part was at the time occupied by Russia. In particular, the Ottoman Empire wanted to annex Iranian Azerbaijan in order to connect with the Russian Azeris and perhaps even realize Pan-Turanism. Falling back to Urmia, the Russian forces left Armenian and Assyrian villages of the Urmia Plain unprotected. Several massacres by Ottoman forces, mostly of adult Christian men, were reported. On 1 January 1915 the Russians suddenly withdrew their army from northwestern Persia, allowing the Ottoman forces (under the command of Naji, Djevdet Bey, and Kazim Karabekir) to occupy it from January to May 1915. Many Armenians and Assyrians left with the retreating Russian forces, walking seven days to the Russian border. By January 1915, the Russian Empire already counted 49,838 Armenians, 8,061 Assyrians, 9,345 Greeks, and 113 other Christians displaced from the war zones into the Russian-controlled Caucasus. Other refugees had not managed to cross the front lines or died in the attempt. At the end of the occupation, when the Russian forces returned with Armenian and Assyrian militia, Ottoman troops massacred local Christians. Historian David Gaunt argues that it was in the Urmia plain "where the Turkish soldiers learned to execute unarmed noncombatant Christians." They continued these killings after retreating from Persia.

=== Escalation of persecution in the Ottoman east ===
In late 1914, the Erzerum branch of the Special Organization was making decisions with regard to the Armenians and communicating these to the Ottoman Third Army. A surviving document dated 1 December 1914 mentions a priority of "preventing an internal revolt in Van and its environs", thought to be potentially led by Armenians, which recommended arresting any Armenians suspected of potentially leading revolts and stating that such individuals "are all to be deported to Bitlis immediately in order that they be exterminated". By December 1914 there were already systematic killings of Armenians (mainly adult men) in the Başkale area. Akçam argues that the more radical decisions with regard to the Armenians were originally made by local officials, and only later approved by the central government and applied elsewhere.

Beginning in November 1914, provincial governors of Van, Bitlis, and Erzerum sent many telegrams to the central government pressing for more severe measures against the Armenians, both regionally and throughout the empire. For example, on 29 November, Djevdet, governor of Van, opined that "to intentionally wait until the blaze (fire) get of the control...would be suicidal for us" and could lead to "another Rumelia", referring to the loss of territory in the Balkans. Talat replied, approving what had already been done and approving such further measures as deemed necessary, but not yet issuing a decision that would apply to the entire country. These pressures played a key role in the intensification of anti-Armenian persecution and met a favorable response already before 1915, which, Akçam emphasizes, was "before the empire had experienced serious military setbacks and faced the prospect of actually losing the war". Talat ordered close surveillance of Armenian political activity at the end of the year. Armenian civil servants were dismissed from their posts in late 1914 and early 1915.

According to Akçam, there is a change from the messages sent in late 1914 and those from March and April 1915 in that the latter are written as if the overall decision to annihilate the Armenians has already been made. At this point, the telegrams openly discuss annihilation and focus on how the decision should be implemented in practice. For example, Akçam quotes a secret cable from Sivas governor Ahmed Muammar to Talat, stating his "opinion that we will no longer be able to live with the Armenians as brothers in this country... if we do not crush them, they will obliterate us without mercy and at the first opportunity".

=== Battle of Sarikamish ===
Minister of War Enver Pasha took over command of the Ottoman armies for the invasion of Russian territory, and tried to encircle the Russian Caucasus Army at the Battle of Sarikamish, fought from December 1914 to January 1915. Unprepared for the harsh winter conditions, his forces were routed, losing more than 60,000 men. The retreating Ottoman army indiscriminately destroyed dozens of Ottoman Armenian villages in Bitlis Vilayet, massacring their inhabitants. Returning to Constantinople, Enver Pasha publicly blamed his defeat on Armenians in the region, saying they had actively sided with the Russians, which became a consensus among CUP leaders.

On 25 February, the Ottoman General Staff issued Directive 8682, "Increased Security Precautions". The directive asserted to disloyal behavior and aid to Russian or French enemies of the empire by Armenians in Bitlis, Aleppo, Dörtyol, and Kayseri. All Armenians serving in Ottoman headquarters staff or headquarters posts were ordered to be removed from their posts. Armenian soldiers were disarmed and transferred to labor battalions. In some places, especially occupied Iran, they were executed outright. Beginning in early 1915, the Armenian soldiers in labor battalions were systematically executed, although many skilled workers were spared until 1916. According to Suny, it was beside the point if the Armenians were actually loyal to the empire as the purpose of the reform was to create an ethnically and religiously homogenous army that could do things a mixed army could not. In March 1915, the Special Organization was reorganized to put it under the direct command of the CUP rather than the Ministry of War.

=== Alleged Armenian conspiracy ===
We have been blamed for not making a distinction between guilty and innocent Armenians. [To do so] was impossible. Because of the nature of things, one who was still innocent today could be guilty tomorrow. The concern for the safety of Turkey simply had to silence all other concerns. Our actions were determined by national and historical necessity.

— Talaat Pasha, Berliner Tageblatt

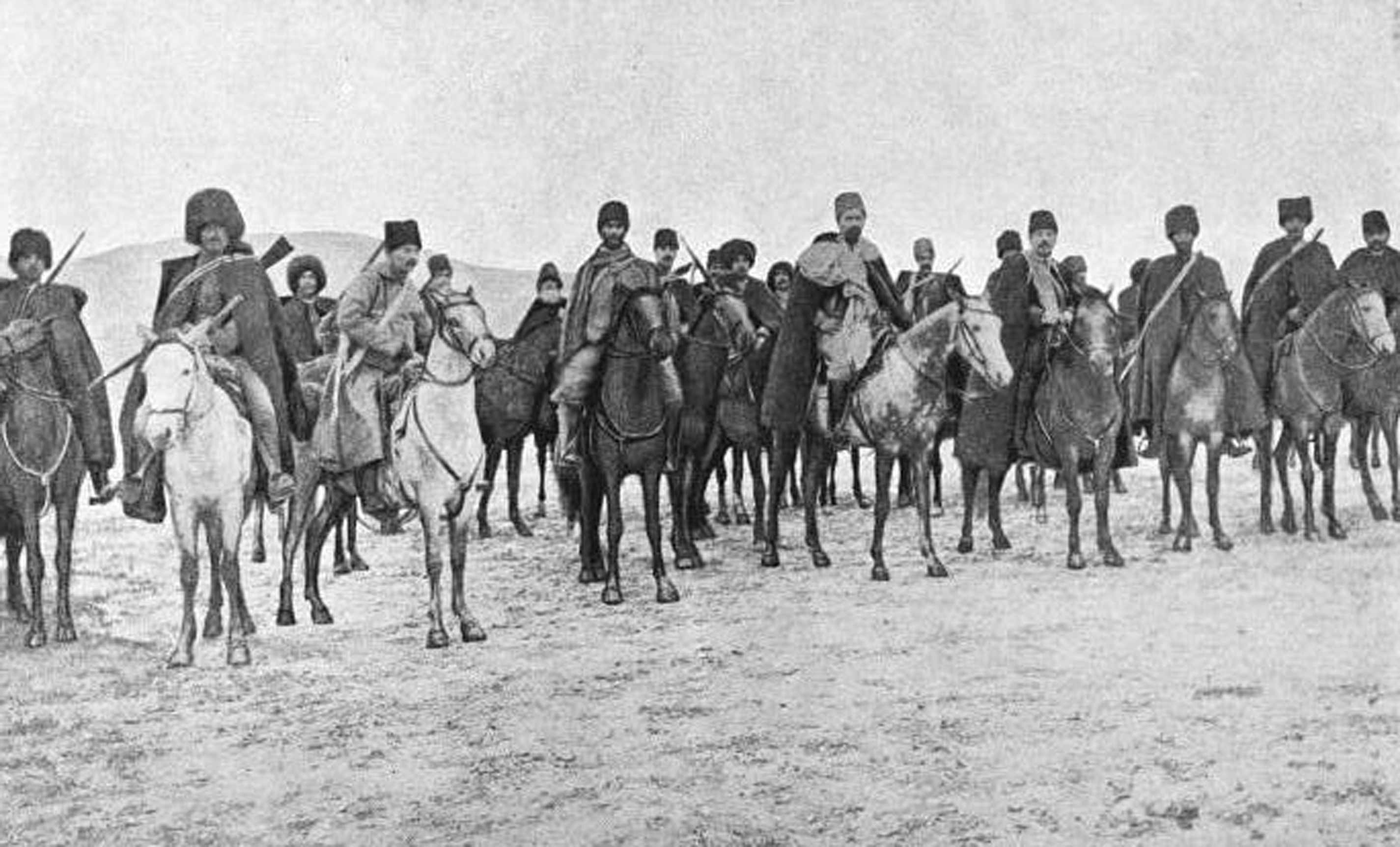
Staff of Armenian volunteer units, 1914

The Russian army included Armenian volunteer units, which were mostly drawn from Russian Armenians. However, the Ottoman authorities were worried that these units would penetrate the lines and join up with deserters to wreak havoc. High-profile defections of a few Ottoman Armenian revolutionaries such as Armen Garo and Hovhannes Kachaznuni confirmed for some that the Ottoman Armenians in general were an internal enemy. Russia also organized Armenian and Assyrian militias to strengthen their position in occupied Iran. Russian orientalist Vladimir Minorsky opposed these efforts, fearing that they "will bring us no military advantage whatsoever and will serve only to unleash just reprisals upon the Christians and their supporters".

Any local incident or discovery of arms in the possession of Armenians was cited as evidence for a coordinated conspiracy against the empire. Reports of local incidents such as weapons caches, severed telegraph lines, and occasional killings fueled paranoia among CUP leaders and confirmed their preexisting beliefs about Armenian treachery. Discounting contrary reports that most Armenians were loyal, the CUP leaders came to the conclusion that the only hope to save the empire was to eliminate the Armenians. The CUP's perception of a widespread Armenian conspiracy did not match the reality. In fact, at its 1914 Erzurum congress, the Armenian Revolutionary Federation declared that Ottoman Armenians should fulfill their obligations as Ottoman subjects, including military service and defense of the empire against a potential invasion from Russia.

The indictment of the Ottoman Special Military Tribunal charged that the deportation of Armenians could not be justified for military reasons as they were deported from across the empire—not just war zones—and that it was not the result of Armenian provocation. Akçam concludes that "the allegations of an Armenian revolt in the documents ... have no basis in reality but were deliberately fabricated".

To dispel rumors that Armenians were disloyal, in early 1915 the Armenian Patriarchate of Constantinople issued a circular urging Armenians throughout the empire "to fulfill their obligations toward the Ottoman fatherland with complete sincerity, just like they have done for centuries".

=== Defense of Van ===
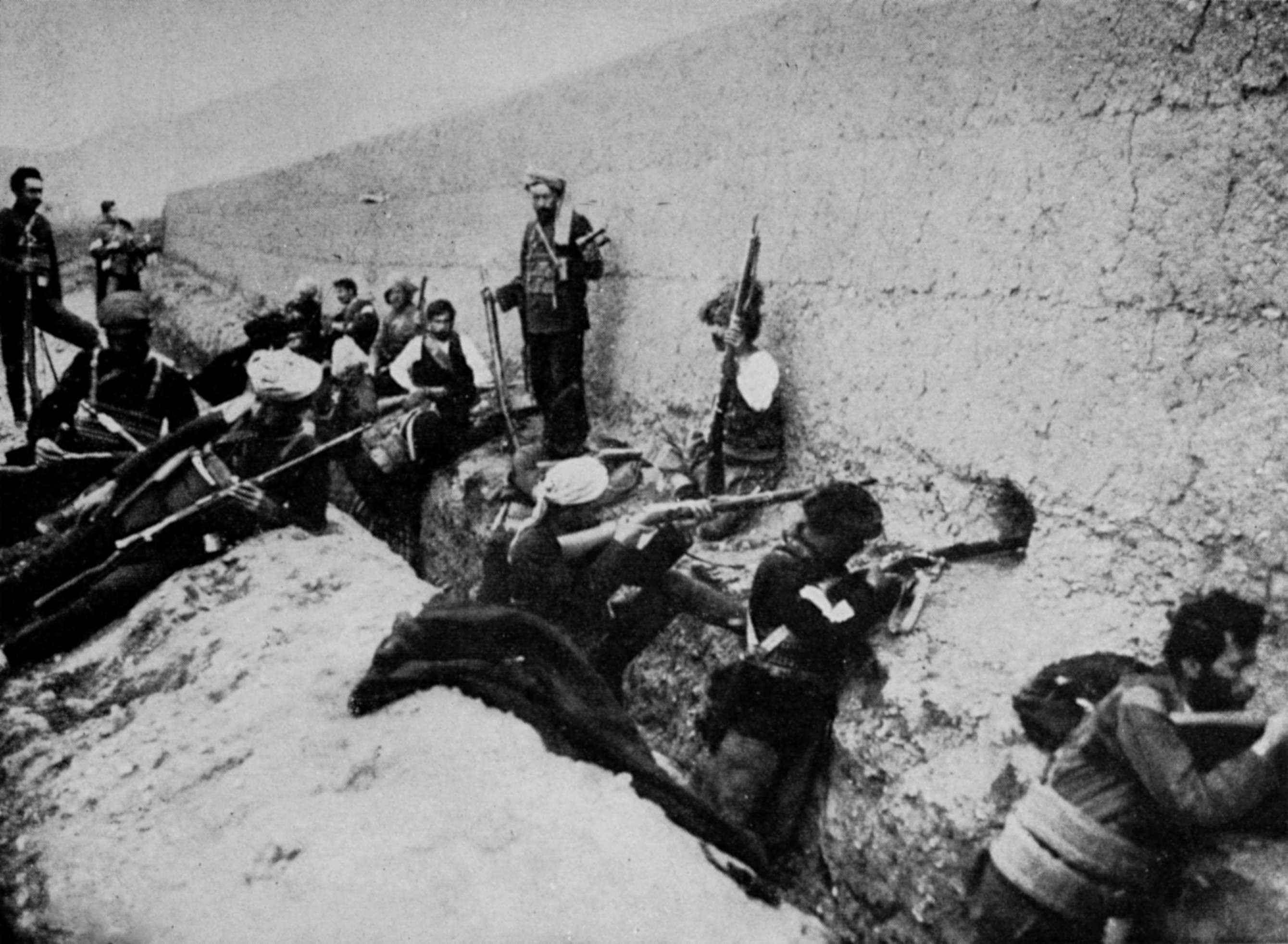
Armenian defenders in Van

Multiple contemporaneous observers and later historians have concluded that Ottoman actions created or knowingly precipitated the conditions for resistance at Van, and that the resulting fighting was subsequently exploited as evidence of a wide-spread Armenian rebellion and as a justification for broader measures against the Armenian population. The historian Stefan Ihrig states that despite evidence that the fighting was a defensive measure, the Defense of Van was used as a pretext for advancing anti-Armenian violence and continues to be cited in literature denying the Armenian genocide.

The Allies launched a major offensive at Gallipoli in April 1915, increasing the sense of existential threat to the Ottoman Empire. Üngör states that the events fueled preexisting fear among the CUP leadership of a "nightmare scenario in which potential Armenian disloyalty would pave the way for an Allied incursion into Anatolia". On 24 April, Talat ordered the arrest and deportation of Armenian intellectuals to decapitate the Armenian leadership.

Former Van governor Tahsin Bey criticized the policies of his successor Djevdet, writing "[t]here would have been no revolt at Van if we had not ourselves created, with our own hands, by using force, this impossible situation from which we are incapable of extricating ourselves". Tahsin objected to further deportations of Armenians on the grounds that they could "be spurred to revolt by the illegitimate use of force". The view that the defense of Van was a pretext for a genocide that had already been decided upon is described by Bloxham and Göçek as "intuitively appealing", although large-scale deportations of Armenians did not begin until mid-May. Mark Levene states that "."

== See also ==
- Late Ottoman genocides
- List of massacres in Turkey
