= Haifa Center for German and European Studies =

The Haifa Center for German and European Studies (HCGES) is a joint project of the University of Haifa and the German Academic Exchange Service (DAAD). The Center was founded in 2007 and opened in June 2008 by the Federal Foreign Minister Frank Walter Steinmeier. It is part of the [ Research Authority of the University of Haifa cooperating with the faculties of humanities, social sciences and law. The founding idea of the Center is to provide students, research, academics and the general public with information about modern Germany and Europe. Therefore the Center is holding public events as well as academic conferences and workshops. It also conducts its own interdisciplinary research with a focus on social, political, legal, economic and cultural developments in Germany and Europe after 1945. The HCGES is part of the global network of DAAD Centers for German and European Studies.

== Research ==
- German Studies
- European Integration
- Modern German History
- Culture of Germany
- Populism
- German Israeli Relations
- European Foreign Policy
- German Economy

== People ==
The Center was first run by Prof. Gilad Margalit together with Prof. Benjamin Bental. In 2015 Prof. Eli Salzberger was appointed director. Since March 2020, Prof. Stefan Ihrig has headed the Center. Among the senior lecturers and Research Fellows are Prof. Fania Oz-Salzberger and Dr. Ayelet Banai

== Academic and public events ==
Academic and public events are an essential pillar of the Center's work. On an annual basis the Center hosts the Annual Europe Day Celebration together with the

In December 2018, the Center hosted a book launch on "The German Political Foundations' Work between Jerusalem, Tel Aviv and Ramallah - A Kaleidoskope of different perspectives". In summer 2019, the Center opened a summer school on "Populism" together with LMU Munich and the University of Wroclaw. In November 2019 the Center organized together with the Heinrich Böll Foundation Israel an international conference on "Decarbonization Strategies in Israel and Germany". Other cooperation partners are the Bucerius Institute, the Friedrich Ebert Stiftung Israel, the School of History at the University of Haifa, and the Embassy of Germany in Tel Aviv.

== MA in Modern German and European Studies ==
The Center offers an English speaking MA Program in "Modern German and European Studies" and a PhD Program. The Master can be accomplished within one or two years. It is an interdisciplinary Master offering courses in German History, European Politics, German Economy, German Culture, European and German Foreign Policy and many others. Besides the academic core courses the students are fully integrated in the Centers activities on campus.

== Center for German Language Courses ==
Another pillar of the Centers work is the German language teaching. The Center offers language courses for university students as well as for the broader public. Courses are offered on all levels and conduct in groups of up to 15 people.

== Publications ==
- Banai, Ayelet (2014). The Territorial Rights of Legitimate States: A Pluralist Interpretation, in: International Theory 6, 140-157.
- Banai, Ayelet (2013). Political Self-Determination and Global Egalitarianism: Towards an Intermediate Position, in: Social Theory and Practice 39, 45-69.
- Banai, Ayelet (2012). ’Europe of the Regions’ and the Problem of Boundaries in Liberal Democratic Theory”, in: Journal of Political Ideologies 17, 35-59.
- Ihrig, Stefan (2008). Wer sind die Moldawier? Rumänismus versus Moldowanismus in Historiographie und Geschichtsschulbüchern der Republik Moldova, 1991-2006. Ibidem Press. ISBN 978-3-89821-466-7.
- Ihrig, Stefan (2014). Atatürk in the Nazi Imagination. Harvard University Press. ISBN 978-0-674-74485-1.
- Ihrig, Stefan (2016). Justifying Genocide: Germany and the Armenians from Bismarck to Hitler. Harvard University Press. ISBN 978-0-674-50479-0.
- Konarek, Katharina / Abelmann, Anna (2018). The German Political Foundations' Work between Jerusalem, Tel Aviv and Ramallah - A Kaleidoskope of different perspectives. Springer Publishing House. ISBN 978-3-658-20019-0
- Oz-Salzberger, Fania (13 April 1995). Translating the Enlightenment: Scottish Civic Discourse in Eighteenth Century Germany (Reprint ed.). USA: Oxford University Press. ISBN 9780198205197.
- Oz-Salzberger, Fania (March 1997). Hebrew Phrase Book. Hunter Pub Inc. ISBN 9780852851814.
- Oz-Salzberger, Fania (1 October 2001). Israelis in Berlin (in German) (1. Aufl. ed.). Frankfurt am Main: Jüdischer Verlag im Suhrkamp-Verlag. ISBN 9783633541713.
- Oz, Amos; Oz-Salzberger, Fania (20 November 2012). Jews and Words. New Haven: Yale University Press. ISBN 9780300156478.
