= Terminology of the Armenian genocide =

The names of the Armenian genocide are different in the English, Turkish, and Armenian languages, and have led to political controversies around the issue of Armenian genocide denial and Armenian genocide recognition. Although the majority of historians writing in English use the word "genocide", other terms exist.

== Armenian ==
=== Yeghern and Medz Yeghern ===
Medz Yeghern (Մեծ եղեռն, Mets yegherrn lit. 'Great Catastrophe') is an Armenian term for genocide, especially the Armenian genocide. The term has been the subject of political controversy because it is perceived as more ambiguous than the word genocide. The term Aghet (Աղետ, lit. 'Catastrophe') is also used. The term Հայոց ցեղասպանություն (Hayots tseghaspanutyun), literally "Armenian genocide", is also used in official contexts, for example, the Tsitsernakaberd (Հայոց ցեղասպանության թանգարան (Armenian Genocide Museum) in Armenia.

== English ==
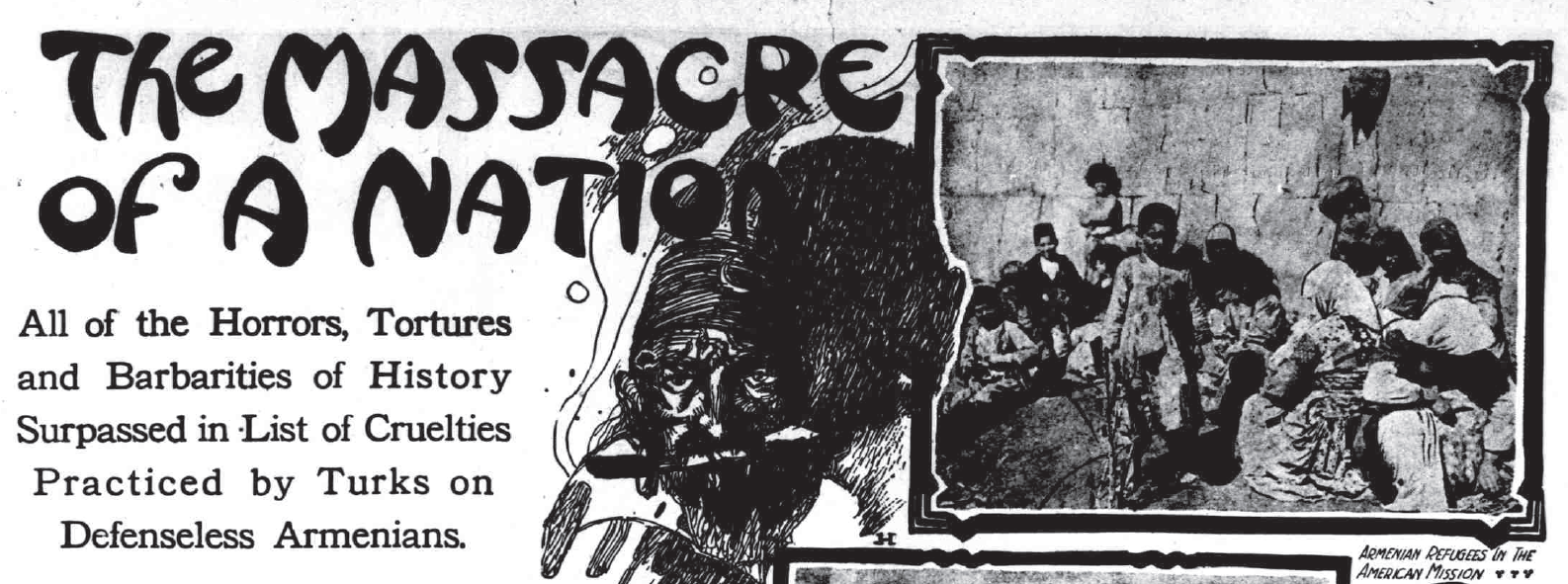
On 19 December 1915, The Washington Herald condemned "The Massacre of a Nation"

Contemporary observers used unambiguous terminology to describe the genocide, including "the murder of a nation", "race extermination" and so forth.

=== Crime against humanity ===
In their declaration of May 1915, the Entente powers called the ongoing deportation of Armenian people a "crime against humanity". Crimes against humanity later became a category in international law following the Nuremberg trials.

=== Genocide ===
The English word genocide was coined by the Polish Jewish lawyer Raphael Lemkin in 1943. Lemkin's interest in war crimes stemmed from the 1921 trial of Soghomon Tehlirian for the assassination of Talaat Pasha; he recognized the fate of the Armenians as one of the main cases of genocide in the twentieth century. Although most international law scholars agree that the 1948 Genocide Convention, which established the prohibition of genocide in international criminal law, is not retroactive, the events of the Armenian genocide otherwise meet the legal definition of genocide. David Gutman states that "few if any scholars, however, reject the use of 'genocide'" for the Armenian case solely because they consider it anachronistic. However, it is possible to write about the Armenian genocide without downplaying or denying it, using a variety of terms other than genocide.

As well as having a legal meaning, the word genocide also "contains an inherent value judgment, one that privileges the morality of the victims over the perpetrators".

=== Ethnic cleansing ===
The term ethnic cleansing, which was invented during the 1990s Yugoslav Wars, is often used alongside or instead of genocide in academic works. Some Turkish historians are willing to call the Armenian genocide ethnic cleansing or a crime against humanity but hesitate at genocide.

== German ==
Völkermord, the German word for genocide, predates the English word and was used by German contemporaries to describe the genocide.

== Turkish ==
Tehcir, the Arabic word meaning leaving at dawn, was first recorded in Turkish language as early as 1916 in official correspondence referring to the Armenian deportations, and became widespread in press jargon after the end of World War I in 1918. The genocide is also unofficially referred to as Ermeni kıyımı and Ermeni kırımı, both meaning "the Armenian massacre".

The Turkish government uses expressions such as "so-called Armenian genocide" (Turkish: sözde Ermeni soykırımı), "the Armenian problem" (Turkish: Ermeni sorunu), "events of 1915" (Turkish: 1915 olayları), often characterizing the charge of genocide as "Armenian allegations" or "Armenian lies". Turkish historian Doğan Gürpınar writes that sözde soykırım is "the peculiar idiom to reluctantly refer to 1915 but outright reject it", invented in the early 1980s to further Armenian genocide denial. However, in 2006, Turkish Prime Minister Recep Tayyip Erdoğan ordered government officials to say "the events of 1915" instead of "so-called Armenian genocide". Erdoğan, as well as some Turkish intellectuals, have distinguished between "good" Armenians (those who live in Turkey and Armenia) who do not discuss the genocide and "bad" ones (primarily the Armenian diaspora) who insist on recognition.

Many Turkish intellectuals have been reluctant to use the term genocide because, according to Akçam, "by qualifying it a genocide you become a member of a collective associated to a crime, not any crime but to the ultimate crime". According to Halil Karaveli, "the word [genocide] incites strong, emotional reactions among Turks from all walks of society and of every ideological inclination".

== Sources ==
- Baker, Mark R. (2015). "The Armenian Genocide and its denial: a review of recent scholarship". New Perspectives on Turkey. 53: 197–212. doi:10.1017/npt.2015.23. S2CID 148198876.
- Cheterian, Vicken (2015). Open Wounds: Armenians, Turks and a Century of Genocide. Hurst. ISBN 978-1-84904-458-5.
- de Waal, Thomas (2015). Great Catastrophe: Armenians and Turks in the Shadow of Genocide. Oxford University Press. ISBN 978-0-19-935069-8.
- Galip, Özlem Belçim (2020). New Social Movements and the Armenian Question in Turkey: Civil Society vs. the State. Springer International Publishing. ISBN 978-3-030-59400-8.
- Gürpınar, Doğan (2016). "The manufacturing of denial: the making of the Turkish 'official thesis' on the Armenian Genocide between 1974 and 1990". Journal of Balkan and Near Eastern Studies. 18 (3): 217–240. doi:10.1080/19448953.2016.1176397. S2CID 148518678.
- Gutman, David (2015). "Ottoman Historiography and the End of the Genocide Taboo: Writing the Armenian Genocide into Late Ottoman History". Journal of the Ottoman and Turkish Studies Association. 2 (1): 167. doi:10.2979/jottturstuass.2.1.167.
- Ihrig, Stefan (2016). Justifying Genocide: Germany and the Armenians from Bismarck to Hitler. Harvard University Press b. ISBN 978-0-674-50479-0.
- Lattanzi, Flavia (2018). "The Armenian Massacres as the Murder of a Nation?". The Armenian Massacres of 1915–1916 a Hundred Years Later: Open Questions and Tentative Answers in International Law. Springer International Publishing. pp. 27–104. ISBN 978-3-319-78169-3.
- Robertson, Geoffrey (2016). "Armenia and the G-word: The Law and the Politics". The Armenian Genocide Legacy. Palgrave Macmillan UK. pp. 69–83. ISBN 978-1-137-56163-3.
- Maksudyan, Nazan (2009). "Walls of Silence: Translating the Armenian Genocide into Turkish and Self-Censorship". Critique. 37 (4): 635–649. doi:10.1080/03017600903205781. S2CID 143658586.
