= Jewish Vocational School Masada =

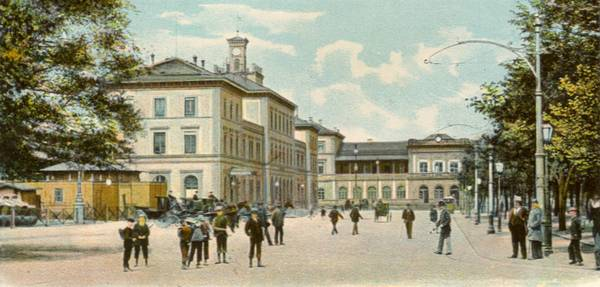
Main-Neckar train station, site of Masada Jewish Vocational School

The Jewish Vocational School Masada (Die Jüdische Berufsfachschule Masada) in Darmstadt was established and run by Samuel Milek Battalion between 1947 and 1948. The school trained and prepared about 45-60 young Holocaust survivors for the purpose of building a kibbutz in Israel. Although the school only existed for ten months, it nevertheless represents an important aspect of the post-war history of Hesse and a manifestation of the re-emergence and establishment of Jewish life in post-war Germany.

== Background ==
The Masada Jewish Vocational School was run by Samuel Milek Batalion between 1947 and 1948. The aim of the school was to give young Holocaust survivors an education, a new will to live and to prepare themselves for a possible life in Israel. The school trained about 45 to 60 students, but was gradually closed after the establishment of the State of Israel on May 14, 1948. Most of the students immigrated to Israel and were recruited into the new established Israel Defense Forces. Although the school only existed for ten months, it was an important in the history of Hesse and a manifestation of the re-emergence and establishment of Jewish life in post-war Germany.

The school was named after the archaeological site of Masada near the Dead Sea. The Masada school was a vocational school affiliated with the Betar movement, a Revisionist Zionist youth movement founded in 1923 with the aim to establish a Jewish state on both sides of the Jordan. The school was founded and supervised by Samuel Milek Batalion. Almost all the schools for Displaced Persons (DPs) known after the war were located in the DP camps and were created and supported by ORT. Thus it was unusual for someone to run a school by himself.

In 1946, Samuel Batalion met Moshe Mordchelewitz in Eschwege at a Betar meeting. Moshe was also very active in the Betar movement. On Moshe's advice, Batalion presented his idea to open a vocational school to the Betar head office in Munich. They approved it, and Battalion received permission to transfer Moshe to Darmstadt to be the madrich, the youth leader, in the new school. The school was partially financed by the Betar Central Committee in Munich and the local American Military Government. Furthermore, the regional German Government and the City of Darmstadt also supported the establishment of the school. Some of the teachers were locally recruited with the help of the local school authorities. JOINT also supported some of the students. Samuel Batalion was very committed to the project. He established locations and organised the lodgings and provisions, teaching staff, financing and equipping of the school. The school was closed several months after the establishment of the State of Israel, since most of the students had been emigrated to Israel. Ludwig Bergsträsser, a German politician and historian who was also present at the inauguration, mentioned the forthcoming closing of the school in his diary on June 18, 1948.

== The School ==
The Masada school was a Betar School. This particular Betar school was founded and supervised by Samuel Milek Battalion. This was quite unusual, because almost all the schools for Displaced Persons (DPs) known after the war were created and supported by ORT with no idealistic or political affiliation.

In 1946, Samuel Battalion met Moshe Mordchelewitz in Eschwege at a Betar conference. Moshe was very active in the Betar movement. Battalion told Moshe about his idea to open a vocational school. On Moshe's advice, he presented his idea to the Betar head office in Munich. They approved it, and Battalion received permission to transfer Moshe to Darmstadt to be the Madrich in the new school.
The school was financed with the assistance of the Betar Central Committee in Munich. The local American Military Government gave some minor support. The local school authorities provided professional teachers. The Jewish community and JOINT supported some of the students. Samuel Battalion was very committed to the project. He established locations and organised the lodgings and provisions, teaching staff, financing and equipping of the school. On May 4, 1949, the Betar Central Committee decided to close Betar Germany after most of the students emigrated to Israel.

== The Buildings ==
The regional German Government and the City of Darmstadt provided the facility of the school and the living quarters of the students nearby.
The school was located within the former building of the Main-Neckar train station, at Steubenplatz in the centre of Darmstadt. This was in contrast to most of the Jewish educational establishments in post-war Germany, which were located within the DP camps. The train station was served by trains until the opening of the main train station in Darmstadt in 1912. From 1937, the building of the old Rhein-Neckar train station housed from the Nazi's welfare organization of the district Hesse-Nassau and was then named the "Jacob-Sprenger house" after the local official.

The students lived and ate in boarding accommodation. For living quarters, the school was granted a building in the hospital complex not far away from the school at Steubenplatz. The students lived and ate within this buildings and walked approximately 20 minutes to the school. The address given for the living quarters is Bismarckstr. 59 and Grafenstr. 9.

In addition to the teaching rooms in the school, there were also workshops which the initiators of the school had mostly built themselves. The students themselves renovated the run-down building. The equipment in the school and the boarding accommodation was considered rudimentary.

== The Inauguration ==
On 13 September 1947, the Jewish vocational school Masada, in Darmstadt, started their first activities. The official opening ceremony of the school was on 9 December. At this ceremony, Colonel Rose, district chief of the American Military Authorities, officially opened the school. Guests at the ceremony included other members of the military authorities, members of Hesse's Regional Parliament, the Head of the Regional Parliament, as well as members of the Darmstadt city council and the city's Jewish community, and representatives of the Central Committee of Betar from Munich. Aron Propes, the leader of the Jewish youth organization Betar in America, also attended the inauguration and gave a speech at the celebration after the opening ceremony. In addition, German and American authorities and representatives of other institutions sent their greetings to the opening ceremony.

== The Curriculum ==
The school aimed to provide Jewish students with the possibility of establishing and building a kibbutz in Israel. The students were trained to become locksmiths, metal workers, carpenters and other tradesmen. To this end, the curriculum included courses in technical calculation, measurement and control technology and electrical installation. The courses on offer ranged from electrical engineering to machine-lathing, mechanical engineering and building-fitting to wood-working. In addition, they were taught Hebrew, Jewish philosophy, physical fitness and the basics of Betar and Zionist ideology, for which books in Hebrew were supplied by Betar Munich. Lessons were held for ten hours a day.

== The Students ==
The school taught about 45 to 60 Holocaust survivors from various DP camps in the American Zone, such as the DP Camps in Babenhausen, Dieburg, Rochelle Eschenstruth, Gabersee in Wasserburg and Weilheim. Each one had managed to survive the holocaust and was now determined to prepare themselves for a future existence in Israel. Most of them came from Poland, with a significant number also coming from Russia. Others originated in countries like Lithuania, Romania, Hungary and Czechoslovakia and spoke several languages. The most common languages were Yiddish and German, followed by Polish and Romanian. Some spoke Hungarian, Russian and Hebrew. Almost all students expressed the wish to emigrate to Palestine. 19 students left for Palestine on 3 July 1948. Only a few stated that they wanted to emigrate to the USA or to stay in Germany.

The Romanians immigrated to Germany quite late, and did not live in the DP camps but instead came directly to the Masada school.

== The Exhibition ==
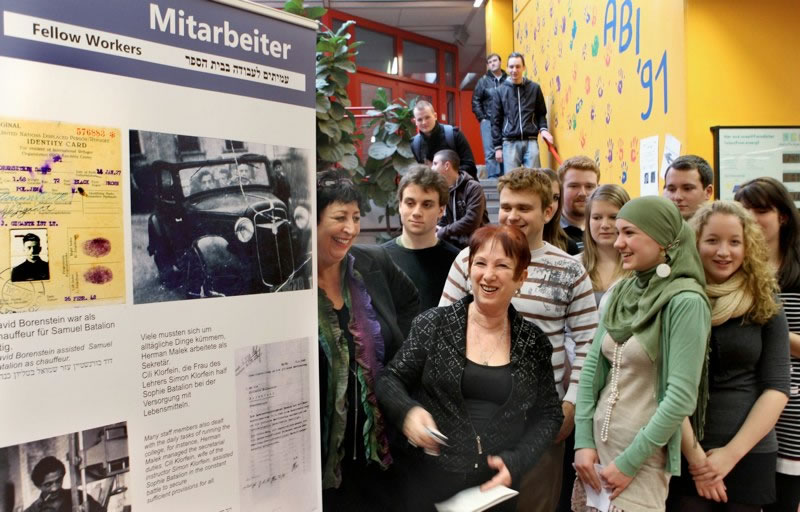
The opening of the exhibition in Darmstadt

Lea Dror-Batalion did some intensive research about her father Samuel Milek Batalion and the Masada Vocational School in Darmstadt. The result is an exhibition about the Jewish Vocational School Masada, which was developed in cooperation with Renate Dreesen and pupils from the Heinrich-Emanuel-Merck-School in Darmstadt, and under the auspices of the University of Haifa and the Bucerius Institute for Research of Contemporary German History and Society.

The exhibition was shown in 2011 in Darmstadt, at the Edith-Stein-School in Darmstadt and at the Friedrich Schiller University in Jena, Germany. The exhibition is also planned for other locations in Germany and Israel.

== Notable faculty ==
=== Samuel Milek Batalion ===
Samuel Batalion was the founder and director of the Masada School.

Samuel Milek Batalion was born 22 September 1918 in Stryj, the son of Natan Batalion-Lebersfeld and Fanny Hennenfeld. He graduated high-school in 1937, at which time he also joined Betar. He registered to study law at the University of Lemberg (Lvov), but fled to Russia towards the end of 1939, soon after reading Hitler's "Mein Kampf". He walked all the way to Perm where he remained for several years. In Perm, he worked as a plumber and later became a station leader of a sovkhoz. He was arrested twice, once because he was accused of being a Zionist. He was released after agreeing to spy on his workers and friends for the NKWD, but after his release, he arranged false papers which identified him as a professional boxer. To avoid his first match, he flew to Saratov. There, with the help of a common acquaintance, he was reunited with his sister Helen. He also met Sophie Osser, whom he married on 8 May 1945. They left Saratov a few months later to travel, via Poland, into Germany. At the end of 1945, disguised as armed Russian soldiers, Batalion and a group of friends crossed over to West Berlin in an officer's car claiming to be on a secret night-time mission. He travelled to Hannover and, from there, on to the DP camp in Eschwege. There he became an UNRRA officer and assisted in organizing several new DP camps. He lived with his wife in Hessisch Lichtenau until October 1946. There he began to plan the establishment of the school and, in May 1947, he was appointed as director of the Jewish Vocational School Darmstadt, a position he held until it closed in 1948. Battalion became an independent tradesman. The couple had two children, Lea Dror-Batalion and Nathan Batalion. The family moved to Frankfurt at the end of 1950. Samuel Batalion died in 2000 in Frankfurt.

=== Moshe Mordchelewitz ===
Moshe Mordchelewitz was the Madrich of the school and taught the students Hebrew, Jewish philosophy, physical fitness and the basics of Betar and Zionist ideology.

Moshe Mordchelewitz was born 18 February 1920 in Kovno (Kaunas), Lithuania. His parents were Sarah Brode and Eisig Mordchelewitz. Moshe had already joined the Betar movement in 1937 upon graduation from high school. In 1939 he was recruited into the Lithuanian army, which was promptly disbanded in 1940 following the Russian invasion. After the Germans occupied Lithuania on June 22, 1941, they created ghettos for the Jews. Moshe's two brothers, Yaakov and Sissel, were shot in the Kovno Ghetto in 1943, and only Moshe was able to escape. Moshe was interred as a forced labourer in Russia until 1945, whereupon he went to Poland in 1946 and then travelled on to Germany. Moshe was very active in the Betar movement and met Samuel Battalion at a Betar conference. He became the Madrich of the Masada school in Darmstadt due to his experience working as a Madrich in Gabersee. Moshe had also led the Herzog Kibbutz in the DP camp at Hessisch Lichtenau. He arrived in Darmstadt in 1947 and lived in the Kibbutz. During the day Moshe often attended university lectures as a guest auditor and taught in the evening. Representatives of the Jewish Agency came from Palestine to Darmstadt to bring the students to Palestine. In April 1948, Moshe was the first to leave the school in order to join the Irgun, a Zionist paramilitary group in Mandate Palestine between 1931 and 1948 which is also known as Etzel, and fight in Palestine. Moshe stated that he boarded the ship "Teti" in Marseille and arrived on May 15, 1948 in Tel Aviv. He was initially recruited into an Irgun combat company. Once the State of Israel was declared, a unified Israel Defense Forces (IDF) was created. Following the incident involving the ship "Atalena", the less-than-willing Irgun was disbanded and its members, Mordchelewitz among them, were integrated into the IDF, for whom he then fought until the end of the 1948 Arab-Israeli War. He was discharged in August 1949. He married Miriam Kalmus on November 8, 1949 and raised two daughters. After his wife died in 1980, he married Falla Minkowitz in 1981, with whom he emigrated to Canada. Moshe Mordchelewitz died in September 2011.

== See also ==
- Jewish education
