= Genocide justification =

Claiming or arguing that a particular genocide is excusable or good

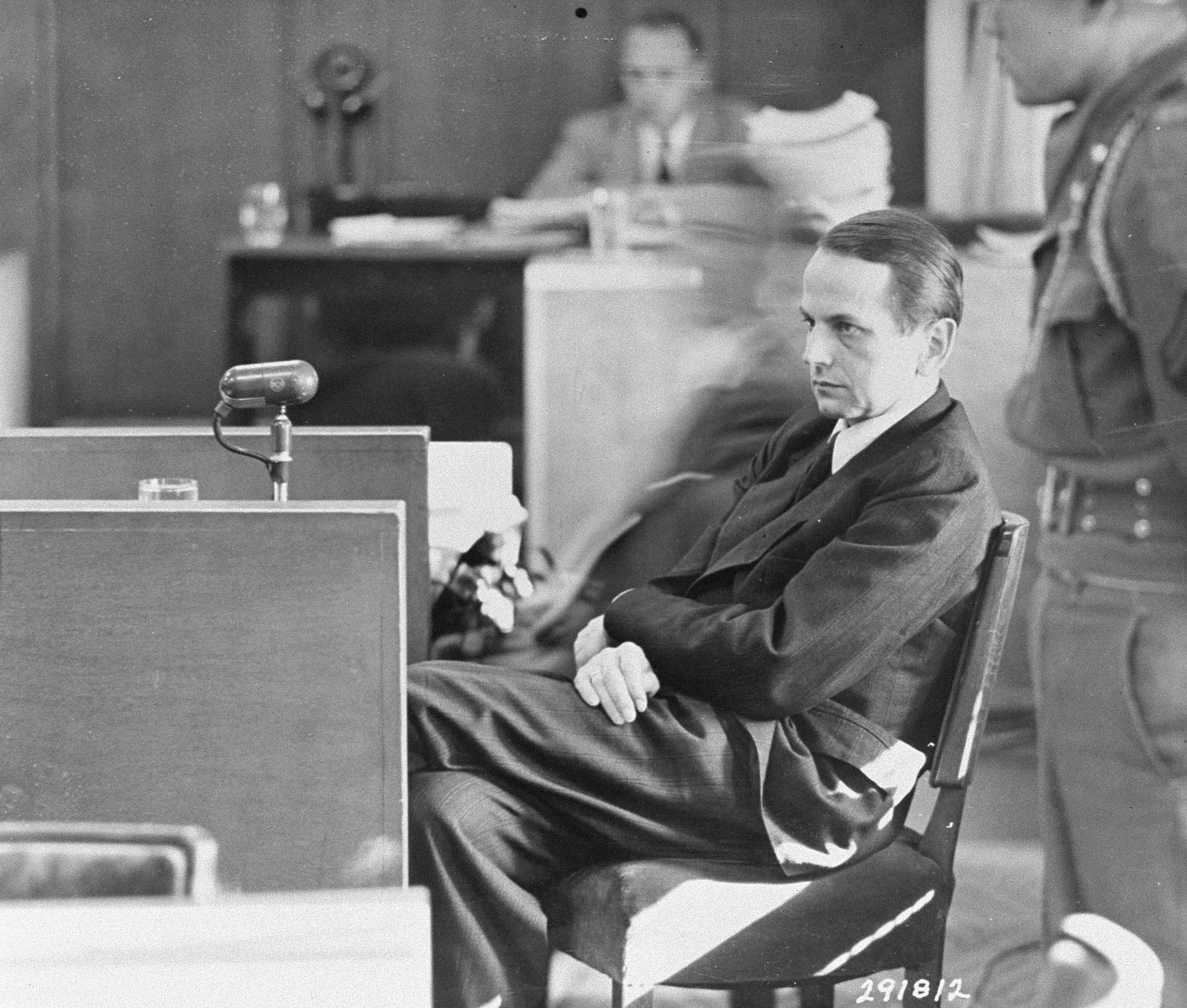
On trial for murder, Otto Ohlendorf argued that killing Jewish children was justified because "the children were people who would grow up and surely, being the children of parents who had been killed, they would constitute a danger no smaller than that of the parents".

Genocide justification is the claim that a genocide is excusable, necessary, legal, or even praiseworthy. Genocide justification differs from genocide denial, which is an attempt to reject the occurrence of genocide. Perpetrators often claim that genocide victims presented a serious threat, justifying their actions by stating it was legitimate self-defense of a nation or state. According to modern international criminal law, there can be no excuse for genocide. Genocide is often camouflaged as military activity against combatants, and the distinction between denial and justification is blurred.

Examples of genocide justification include, but are not limited to the Turkish nationalists' claims in regard to the Armenian genocide, the Nazis' justifications behind the Holocaust, anti-Tutsi propaganda during the Rwandan genocide, Serbian nationalists' justifications for the Srebrenica massacre, the Myanmar government's claims about the Rohingya genocide, and most recently the Israeli government and Zionist declarations about the Gaza Genocide, with all cases having sects and actors that simultaneously engage in genocide denial.

== Legality ==
Several laws against genocide denial also forbid the justification of genocide. In addition, some countries have laws against genocide justification but not genocide denial. For example, in Spain, a law criminalizing genocide denial was struck down as unconstitutional by the Spanish Supreme Court.

As of now, only 12 nations have criminalized genocide justification, including Andorra, Colombia, Liechtenstein, North Macedonia, Rwanda, and Switzerland. In addition, justification of genocide during ongoing killings may constitute incitement to genocide, which is criminalized under international criminal law.

== In general ==
All genocides are considered to go along with rationalizing narratives justifying them in terms of threat and urgency, and the perpetrators consider their actions right and necessary.

According to W. Michael Reisman, "many of the individuals who are directly responsible operate within a cultural universe that inverts our morality and elevates their actions to the highest form of group, tribe, or national defense". Bettina Arnold observed, "It is one of the terrible ironies of the systematic extermination of one people by another that its justification is considered necessary." She also argued that archaeology and ancient history are sometimes used to justify genocide. Rationalizing genocide helps perpetrators accept their actions and role in the genocide, preserving their self-image. Academic Abdelwahab El-Affendi writes that one of the horrors of genocide "is when everyone else, including academics and leading intellectuals, seems to believe the narrative, or at least prevaricate about its plausibility".

== Examples ==
=== 1804 Haitian massacre ===
According to the historian Philippe R. Girard, the genocide of French Creoles after the Haitian Revolution was justified by its perpetrators based on the following rationales:

1. The ideals of the French Revolution justified the massacre.
2. Atrocities committed by French troops in Haiti permitted revenge.
3. Radical measures were necessary to secure victory in the war and emancipate the slaves.
4. Whites were not human.
5. Black leaders hoped to take over plantations previously owned by whites.

Girard notes that after the massacre, the man who ordered it, Jean-Jacques Dessalines, stated, "We answered these cannibals' war with war, crime with crime, outrage with outrage." For Dessalines, Girard writes, "genocide merely amounted to vengeance, even justice". Historian C. L. R. James wrote that the massacre was only a tragedy for its perpetrators because of the brutal practices of slaveholding.

Adam Jones and Nicholas Robinson have classified this as a subaltern genocide, meaning "genocide by the oppressed", and that it contains "morally plausible" elements of retribution or revenge. Jones said that this type of genocide is less likely to be condemned and may even be welcomed, despite the torture and execution of thousands of women and children on the island.

=== Armenian genocide ===
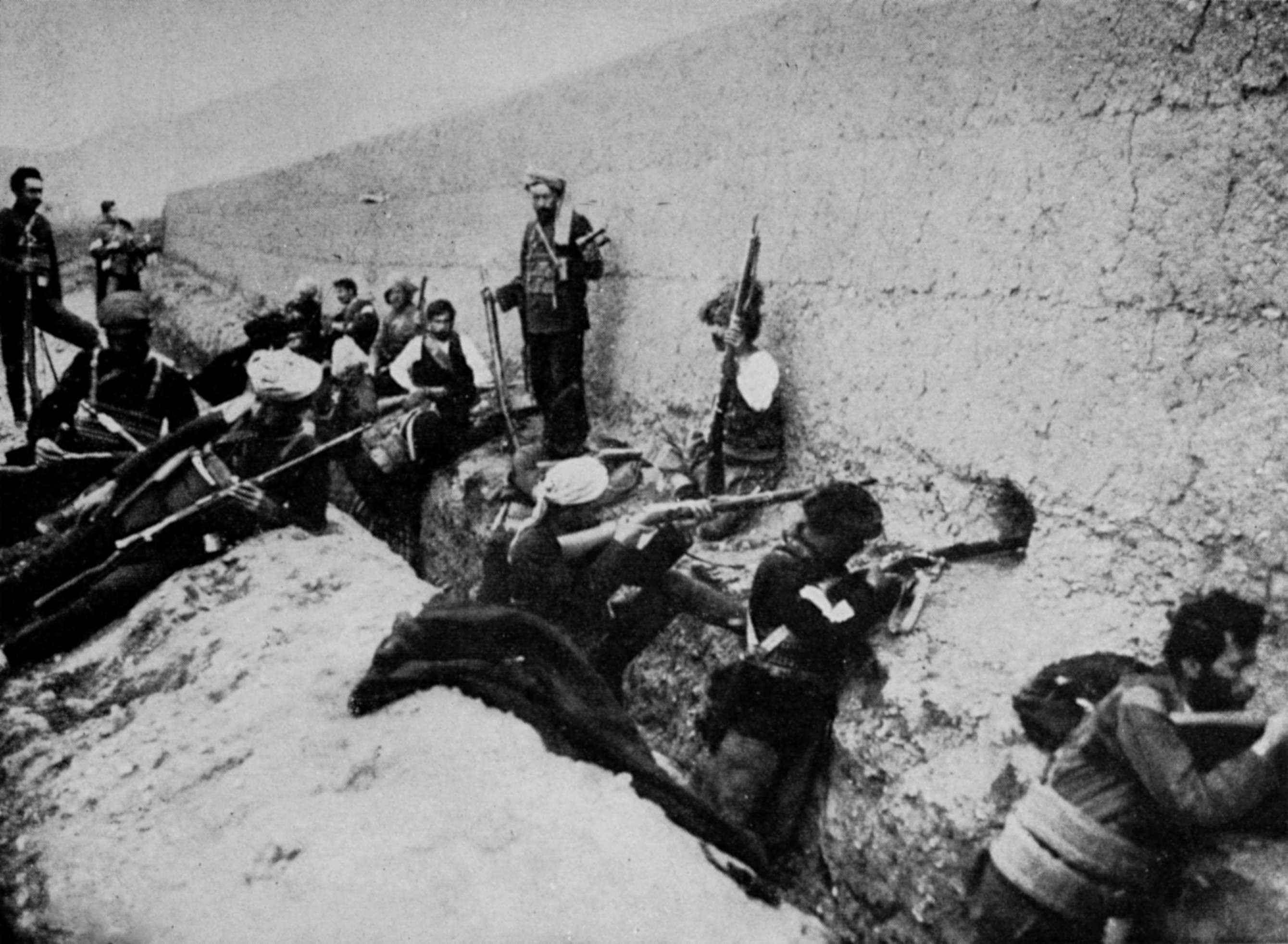
The defense of Van is a crucial element in works that seek to justify the genocide.

Justification and rationalization are commonly associated with the Armenian genocide. Perpetrators portrayed the killings as a legitimate defense against Armenians who were perceived as traitors colluding with Russia during a time of war. Both at the time and later, it has been claimed that the deportation of Armenians was justified by military necessity. Historian Erik Jan Zürcher summarizes this "defense of violent aggression" as "they asked for it, it was not really so bad and anyway, others have done the same and worse."

Historian Hans-Lukas Kieser said, "To justify genocide, Talaat framed a whole discourse and set of arguments, so that the self-righteous justification for murder and destruction remained entrenched in later memoirs, politics, and historiography." In an interview with Berliner Tageblatt in May 1915, Talaat stated, "We have been blamed for not making a distinction between guilty and innocent Armenians. [To do so] was impossible. Because of the nature of things, one who was still innocent today could be guilty tomorrow. The concern for the safety of Turkey simply had to silence all other concerns. Our actions were determined by national and historical necessity."

In 1919, Mustafa Kemal — the future founding figure of Turkey — stated:

Whatever has befallen the non-Muslim elements living in our country, is the result of the policies of separatism they pursued in a savage manner, when they allowed themselves to be made tools of foreign intrigues and abused their privileges. There are probably many reasons and excuses for the undesired events that have taken place in Turkey. And I want definitely to say that these events are on a level far removed from the many forms of oppression which are committed in the states of Europe without any excuse.

Turkish historian and military officer Ahmet Refik Altınay published a pseudo-historical book named "İki Komite iki Kitâl" in 1919 which he claimed that the Armenians of Turkey died as a result of a symmetrical civil war instead of a national extermination.

Famous novelist Halide Edib Adıvar justified her own assimilatory actions on Armenian oprhans during the war.

In 1920, parliamentarian Hasan Fehmi stated:

This deportation business, as you know, has put the whole world in an uproar, and has branded us all as murderers. We knew even before this was done that the Christian world would not stand for it, and that they would turn their fury and hatred on us because of it. But why should we call ourselves murderers? These things that were done were to secure the future of our homeland, which we hold more sacred and dear than our very lives.

According to Fatma Müge Göçek, "The sentiments of the Turkish state and populace toward these CUP leaders are best captured in one memoir that noted:"

There were no Armenians left in east, central Anatolia and to a certain degree in the western regions. If this cleaning had not been carried out, getting the independence struggle to succeed could have been much more difficult and could have cost us much more. May God be merciful and compassionate toward Enver and Talat Pashas who actualized this [cleaning]. Their foresight has saved the Turkish nation.

In the interwar era, many Germans believed that the Armenian genocide was justified. Author Stefan Ihrig argues that, in the early 1920s, the Germans who had denied the Armenian genocide switched to justifying it after accepting the historicity of the events. During the trial of Soghomon Tehlirian, several German newspapers such as the Deutsche Allgemeine Zeitung, the Frankfurter Zeitung, or the Berliner Lokal-Anzeiger published articles and essays, which justified the annihilation of the Armenian people.

=== The Holocaust ===
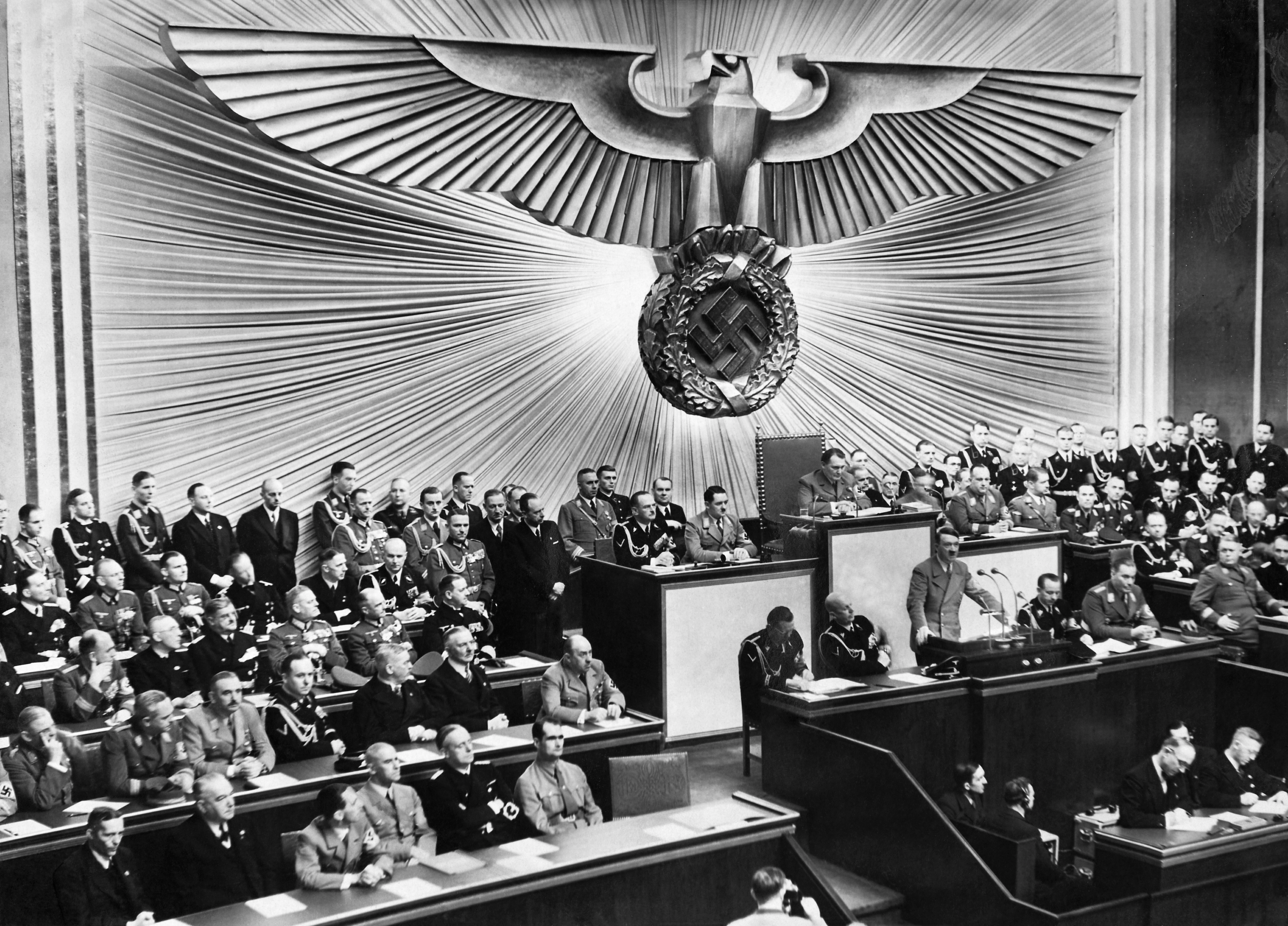
Adolf Hitler's speech in the Reichstag

The Nazis preferred to justify the killing of Jews rather than refute it, as seen in Hitler's prophecy, a speech by Hitler where he stated that it was time to "wrestle the Jewish world enemy to the ground", and that the German government was completely determined "to get rid of these people". Another example of Nazi justification is the 1943 Posen speeches, in which SS chief Heinrich Himmler argued that the systematic mass murder of Jews was necessary and justified, although an unpleasant task for individual SS men.

During the Einsatzgruppen trial, Otto Ohlendorf, responsible for the deaths of 90,000 Jews, did not deny that the crimes occurred or that he was responsible for them. Instead, he justified the systematic murder as anticipatory self-defense against the mortal threat supposedly posed by Jews, Romani people, Communists, and others. Ohlendorf argued that the killing of Jewish children was necessary because, knowing how their parents died, they would grow up to hate Germany. Ohlendorf's claims were not accepted by the court, and he was sentenced to death for crimes against humanity, war crimes, and membership in a criminal organization. He was executed by hanging in 1951.

Since the end of World War II, cases of justifying the Holocaust have also been observed in Iran, the Arab world, and Eastern Europe, in which the alleged behavior of Jews is claimed to cause antisemitism and justify the killing of Jews. Some Moldovan historians have claimed that the Holocaust in Romania was justified by the lack of loyalty shown by Jews to the interwar Romanian state.

=== Rwandan genocide ===
The Rwandan genocide was justified by its perpetrators as a legitimate response to the military campaign of the Rwandan Patriotic Front, including by its mastermind, Théoneste Bagosora, who repeated these arguments at the trial which resulted in his conviction for genocide. Justification attempts include "shifting blame from the government to the RPF forces and an attempt to claim the acts were done in self-defense".

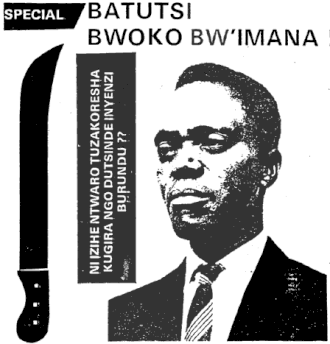
The cover of the November 1991 issue of Kangura. The title states, "Tutsi: Race of God", while the text to the right of the machete states, "Which weapons are we going to use to beat the cockroaches for good?". The man pictured is the second president of the First Republic, Grégoire Kayibanda, who made Hutu the governing ethnicity after the 1959 massacres.

Following the assassination of Hutu President Juvénal Habyarimana, Hutu propagandists exploited the pre-existing stereotype that equated all Tutsi with the RPF. By intentionally merging the Tutsi community with the RPF, they propagated the narrative that Tutsi were responsible for the president's assassination. This narrative is reinforced by the statement, "relying on the easy identification of all Tutsi with the RPF, Hutu propagandists said Tutsi deserved whatever ill befell them because it was they who had launched the war in the first place."

The emergence of the Hutu newspaper Kangura marked a turning point in the dissemination of anti-Tutsi propaganda, often inciting violence. Established in the early 1990s, Kangura played a pivotal role in shaping public opinion and escalating ethnic tensions in Rwanda. The cover of the November 1991 issue of Kangura is emblematic of this propaganda campaign. Next to a menacing image of a machete, the text poses a chilling question, "Which weapons are we going to use to beat the cockroaches for good?" This dehumanizing language was deliberately employed to justify violence against the Tutsi population. The manipulation of historical figures in such imagery aimed to legitimize the Hutu victimhood narrative and fuel the genocidal ideologies that would later manifest in the tragic events of 1994.

The media landscape of the region, which included a popular radio show Radio Rwanda, played a crucial role in shaping public opinion of Tutsi people. In March 1992, Radio Rwanda warned that "Hutu leaders in Bugesera were going to be murdered by Tutsi", deliberately spreading false information to spur the Hutu massacres of Tutsi. Collusion between various media outlets, including Kangura and the radio station RTLM, strengthened the impact of these false narratives, further reinforcing dangerous ideologies that culminated in the events of the Rwandan genocide in 1994.

=== Bosnian genocide ===
The Srebrenica massacre is justified by Serbian nationalists who argue that it was necessary to defend against the "Muslim threat", or as a justified revenge for the 1993 Kravica attack. However, Serbian nationalists do not acknowledge that genocide occurred in Bosnia despite the ICTY verdict, and argue that the Bosnian death toll is substantially lower than historians and the ICTY have concluded. Conducting interviews with Serbs in Bosnia, Janine Natalya Clark found that many interviewees endorsed the idea "that those killed in Srebrenica were combatants and therefore legitimate military targets", alongside beliefs that the massacre was exaggerated.

=== Rohingya genocide ===
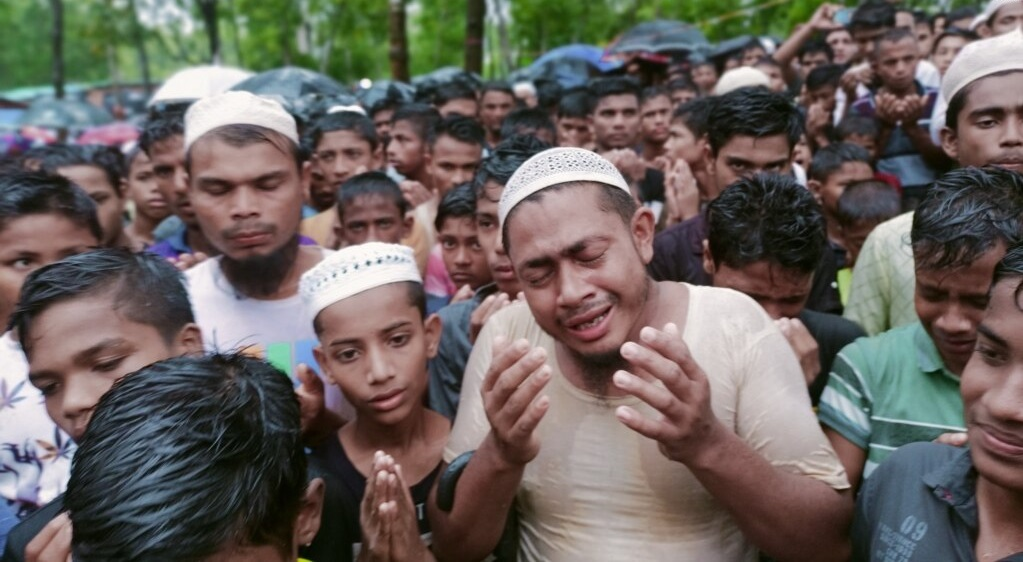
Rohingya refugees gathered on Genocide Remembrance Day.

Myanmar leader, Aung San Suu Kyi, defends the military's actions during what has been described as the Rohingya genocide in Myanmar, a result of private and structural Islamophobia in Myanmar, as well as increasing tensions and conflict "between Rohingya Muslims and the Burman Buddhist Majority". In 2017, The Intercept reported that she was "an apologist for genocide, ethnic cleansing, and mass rape". After her December 2019 remarks in the International Court of Justice, American political scientist William Felice wrote that she used "the same arguments that organizers of genocide and ethnic cleansing deployed throughout the 20th century to validate mass murder". Physicians for Human Rights states that Myanmar "continues to justify their mass extermination [of Rohingya] as a reasonable response to 'terrorist activities.'" Refugees International said that she was "defending the most indefensible of crimes"—genocide. The Union Solidarity and Development Party (USDP) of Myanmar's democratic government were hostile and violent in their persecution and abuse of Rohingya Muslims. Their actions were justified "through the pretense of operating in the name of a democratically elected regime and not a military dictatorship".

=== Gaza genocide ===
Some authors have criticized justifications of Israel's military actions in Gaza, which are widely considered by experts to amount to genocide. Some of these justifications have come from within the field of genocide studies. Raz Segal writes that "key Holocaust memory institutes" such as the United States Holocaust Memorial Museum and Shoah Foundation start from the premise that the Holocaust is unique and Israel, viewed as a nation of Holocaust survivors, cannot commit another genocide. This has contributed to these institutions' "rationalization and legitimation of Israel’s genocide in Gaza from the very beginning".

== See also ==
- Accusation in a mirror
- Bibliography of genocide studies
- Colonialism in genocide
- Hate studies
- Holocaust denial, a form of genocide denial
- Incitement
- Outline of genocide studies
- Psychology of genocide
- Risk factors for genocide
- Supremacism
- War and genocide

== Sources ==
- Ihrig, Stefan (2016). Justifying Genocide: Germany and the Armenians from Bismark to Hitler. Harvard University Press. ISBN 978-0-674-91517-6.
