= Manfred Lahnstein =

German politician (born 1937)

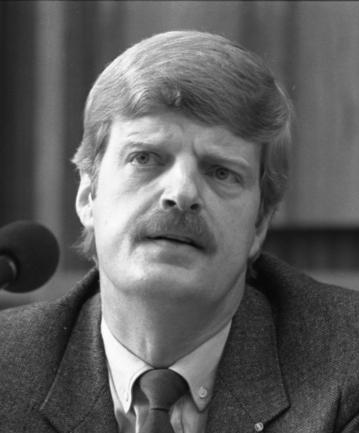
- Lahnstein in 1983

Federal Minister of Finance (West Germany)
- In office 28 April 1982 – 4 October 1982
- Preceded by: Hans Matthöfer
- Succeeded by: Gerhard Stoltenberg

Federal Minister of Economics (West Germany)
- In office 17 September 1982 – 4 October 1982
- Preceded by: Otto Graf Lambsdorff
- Succeeded by: Otto Graf Lambsdorff

Member of the Bundestag
- In office 29 March 1983 – 31 August 1983

Personal details
- Born: 20 December 1937 (age 88) Erkrath, Germany
- Party: Social Democratic Party of Germany (SPD)

Manfred Lahnstein (born 20 December 1937) is a German politician of the Social Democratic Party (SPD). In 1982 he was German Federal Minister of Finance as well as Federal Minister of Economics and until 2004 worked for the media conglomerate Bertelsmann.

== Early life ==
The son of a country doctor in Erkrath, Manfred Lahnstein grew up with three siblings.

== Career ==
In 1982, Lahnstein became West Germany's minister of finance under Helmut Schmidt. To 1983 he was professional politician. In 1983 Manfred Lahnstein was recruited by Bertelsmann AG in Gütersloh, from the Bundestag. At Bertelsmann, he was initially on the board responsible for printing and industrial enterprises, and moved in 1994 as a member of the Supervisory Board. From 1998 to 2004 he worked for the Bertelsmann Group, as special representative of the Board.

From 1986, he is professor of culture and media management at the Hochschule für Musik und Theater Hamburg.

Since 1994, he heads in Hamburg the consulting firm Lahnstein & Partners, International Consultants.

Since 1996, he is Chairman of the Board of Trustees of one of Germany's largest private foundations, the ZEIT-Stiftung.

He was the first German and Non-Jew to become Chairman of the Board of Governors at the University of Haifa in 2001, where he had been Governor since 1996. The Bucerius Institute for Research of Contemporary German History and Society at the University of Haifa was founded in 2001 on this occasion by the ZEIT-Stiftung.

In February 2009, he was appointed to the Supervisory Board of the London-based investment company Berger Lahnstein Middelhoff & Partners LLP (BLM Partners).

Lahnstein is an adviser to the Saudi conglomerate Olayan Group and the investment bank Rothschild.

== Personal life ==
Lahnstein is married to Sonja Lahnstein-Kandel. They live in Hamburg and have one daughter and a son from his first marriage.

== Other activities ==
- Friedrich Ebert Foundation (FES), Member
