= Gilad Margalit =

Israeli historian, writer and professor (1959-2014)

Gilad Margalit (Hebrew: גלעד מרגלית; 1959 in Haifa, Israel – 23 July 2014) was an Israeli historian, writer, and professor in the Department of General History at the University of Haifa.

Margalit's academic research focused on various aspects of post-war Germany and its process of coming to terms with the Nazi past (Vergangenheitsbewältigung), including antisemitism and attitudes to ethnic minorities — Romani, Turks and Jews. He particularly examined expressions and reflections of the Germans dealing with this matter. Margalit also worked on an oral history project about the Turks in Germany and their process of creating a collective German-Turkish identity.

== Biography ==
Margalit completed his doctoral thesis at the Hebrew University in 1996. He worked under the supervision of Prof. Moshe Zimmermann from the Hebrew University and Prof. Dan Diner from Tel-Aviv University and University of Duisburg-Essen. His work was awarded the ‘Jacob Talmon Prize’.

== Academic research ==
=== German policies and attitudes since 1945 toward the German Gypsies ===
Margalit started his academic career with a dissertation on German policies and attitudes since 1945 toward a small German minority, the Gypsies (Sinti and Roma). Traditionally, the Gypsies had been rejected by German society; and they had been persecuted and murdered by the Nazis. The study, which later appeared as the book Germany and its Gypsies, demonstrates the extent to which prejudices against Gypsies continued to play a major role in forming the policies toward them after Auschwitz. These include, for example, the reluctance of both postwar Germanies to compensate them for their sufferings during the Nazi period, as well as the authorities' attempts to resume their control over the free movement of itinerants.

=== Official remembrance ceremonies and memorials for the German war dead ===
The second major issue with which Margalit has been engaged since 1999 culminated in the 2010 publication of the English edition of his book Guilt, Suffering, and Memory. In this study Margalit discusses the official remembrance ceremonies for the German war dead, the memorials erected to commemorate them, the public discussions of the disparate German cultures (FRG and the GDR), and their treatment in postwar German literature and film. In this book Margalit claims that Germany’s changing historical memory of the Second World War and its aftermath, as reflected in the official and public remembrance of the German war dead, exposes an unresolved tension between a discourse of guilt and a discourse of national suffering and victimization. In Germany, under the auspices of the Allied occupation, memorials honoured the victims of the Nazis and those who had fought against the regime. After the partition of Germany, a new culture emerged, commemorating the fallen German soldiers as well as the civilian dead. Despite the fierce ideological rivalry between East and West Germany, however, certain similarities existed. The political leaderships who shaped these cultures ceased to confront their citizens with the question of guilt; instead, they depicted the German people as victims.

=== German Turks ===
Margalit's latest research topic was an oral history project on German Turks. Turkish immigrants started arriving in West Germany in 1960, after an agreement between Turkey and the Federal Republic on supplying Gastarbeiter ("guest workers") for the German labour market. 10 years later, they had become the biggest community of foreigners in the Federal Republic of Germany. His research focused in the Turkish experience of living among Germans, focuses at the religious and cultural difference and otherness of the Turks to their German surroundings, and the prejudices against them, which turns their integration into a complicated and significant challenge. Margalit mainly concentrates on the second and third generation of German Turks and their process of building a clearly defined collective German-Turkish identity. Another aspect in Margalit's research is the Turks attitudes to the German past and to the Holocaust.

== Academic positions held ==
- 2007 Chair of the founding team of the Haifa Center for German and European Studies (HCGES).
- 2007-2012 Haifa Center for German and European Studies, Deputy Director.
- 2008 Bucerius Institute for Research of Contemporary German History and Society, Member of the Academic Steering.

== Scholarships and awards ==
- The Doctoral thesis awarded the ‘Jacob Talmon Prize', 1995.
- DAAD Scholarship at the Institut für Zeitgeschichte, Munich, the University of Cologne and Mainz, 2006.
- Guilt, Suffering and Memory. On German Commemoration of the German victims of WWII The University of Haifa Press 2006 (Heb.) 254 pp. was awarded the ‘Bahat Prize’ for the original book, 2007.
- A scholarship from the Alexander von Humboldt Foundation, 2001-2003, 2005, 2007, 2009.
- A scholarship from the Friedrich Ebert Foundation for an oral history project on German Turks, 2010.

== Publications ==
=== Authored books ===
- Postwar Germany and the Gypsies. The Treatment of Sinte and Roma in the Aftermath of the Third Reich, Jerusalem: Magnes Press 1998, 280 pp. (Heb.)
- Die Nachkriegsdeutschen und "ihre Zigeuner". Die Behandlung der Sint und Roma im Schatten von Auschwitz, Berlin: Metropol Verlag, 2001 304 pp.
- Germany and its Gypsies. A Post-Auschwitz Ordeal, Madison: The University of Wisconsin Press 2002. 280 pp.
- Guilt, Suffering and Memory. On German Commemoration of the German victims of WW II. The University of Haifa Press 2006 (Heb.) 254 pp
- Guilt, Suffering and Memory, Germany Remembers Its Dead of World War II, translated by Haim Watzman. Bloomington: Indiana University Press 2010. 404 pp.

=== Edited books ===
- Gilad Margalit & Yfaat Weiss (eds.), Memory and Amnesia. The Holocaust in Germany, Tel-Aviv: HaKibbutz HaMeuchad, 2005, 427 pp. (Hebrew)

=== Selected articles ===
- "Antigypsyism in the Political Culture of the Federal Republic of Germany : A Parallel with Antisemitism?" Analysis of Current Trends in Antisemitism (ACTA) 9 (1996), 1-29.
- "The Justice System of the Federal Republic of Germany and the Nazi Persecution of the Gypsies", Holocaust and Genocide Studies, VII (1997), 330-350.
- "The Image of the Gypsy in German Christendom", Patterns of Prejudice vol. 33 No. 2 (1999), 75-83.
- "The Representation of the Nazi Persecution of the Gypsies in German Discourse after 1945", German History, vol. 17 Issue 2 (1999) 220-239.
- "The Uniqueness of the Nazi Persecution of the Gypsies", Romani Studies 5, Vol. 10, No. 2 (2000) 185-210.
- "Israel through the Eyes of West German Press 1947 – 1967", Jahrbuch für Antisemitismusforschung 11 (2002) 235-248.
- "On Ethnic Essence and the Notion of German Victimization: Martin Walser and Asta Scheib's Armer Nanosh and the Jew within the Gypsy". German Politics and Society, Issue 64, Vol. 20, No. 3 Fall (2002) 15-39.
- "German Expelled Foreign Policy: Hans-Christoph Seebohm and Initiatives of the German Sudeten Homeland Society 1956-1964". Central European History 43, Number 4, 2010 approx. 27 pp. (forthcoming).
- "Literary Mirroring of German Suffering during WWII". Theory and Criticism Vol. 30 Summer (2007) 267-281. (Heb.)

=== Selected articles in German ===
- "Zwischen Romantisierung, Ablehnung und Rassismus. Zur Haltung der deutschen Gesellschaft gegenueber Sinti und Roma nach 1945", Jahrbuch für Antisemitismusforschung, VI (1997), 243-265.
- "Die deutsche 'Zigeunerpolitik' nach 1945", Vierteljahrshefte für Zeitgeschichte, 45 (1997), 557-588.
- "Sinte und andere Deutsche - Über ethnische Spiegelungen", Tel-Aviver Jahrbuch für deutsche Geschichte, XXVI (1997), 281-306.
- "Rassismus zwischen Romantik and Völkermord. Die 'Zigeunerfrage' im Nationalsozialismus", Geschichte in Wissenschaft und Unterricht 49 (1998), 400-420.
- " Großer Gott, Ich danke Dir dass Du kleine schwarze Kinder gemacht hast. Der Zigeunerpastor - Georg Althaus", WerkstattGeschichte 25 (2000) 59-73
- "Gedenk- und Trauerkultur im Nachkriegsdeutschland. Anmerkungen zur Architektur", Mittelweg 36 Heft 2 (2004) 76-91.
