= 1914 Dashnak Congress at Erzurum =

1914 Ottoman meeting during WWI

The Dashnak congress at Erzurum, the eighth world congress of the Armenian Revolutionary Federation (ARF), was held in July–August 1914 shortly before the Ottoman Empire entered World War I.

Learning of the congress, the Ottoman government — comprising the Committee of Union and Progress (CUP) — sent representatives with a proposal that Ottoman Armenians support the Ottoman war effort and encourage Armenians within the Russian Empire (Eastern Armenia) to rebel against the Russia. The Ottomans were preparing for a conquest of Transcaucasia in the event of the opening up of a Caucasus front during World War I. In return, the Ottomans reportedly offered autonomy for Western Armenia and its eventual reunification with Russian Armenia.

The ARF rejected the proposal to incite rebellion in Russia and maintained that Armenians in both empires should fulfill their obligations to the states of which they were subjects. The congress therefore ended without an agreement between the CUP and the ARF, and the Ottoman government subsequently regarded the possibility of Armenian cooperation with Russia as a wartime security concern, eventually culminating in the Armenian genocide.

== Proposals ==
The Ottoman plan was to draw the Persians, Kurds, Tatars and Georgians into a holy war against the Allies. In order to carry this project it was necessary to make sure that Armenian (if the Armenians became hostile), their geographical position would not hamper cooperation between these peoples. The Ottoman Empire promised Ottoman Armenians autonomy in Western Armenia and reunification with Eastern (Russian) Armenia in exchange for supporting the Ottoman war effort and inciting rebellion among Russian Armenians against Russia. This offer was one step forward from Armenian reform package, which was already established in February 1914.

Conversely, the Imperial Russia promised to give autonomy to Russian Armenia after World War I if they agreed to support Russia during the conflict. The Tsar promised autonomy to six Turkish Armenian vilayets of Western Armenia as well as the two Russian-Armenian provinces. Earlier a Tsarist Minister of Foreign Affairs reportedly had confided Russia's aim: "We need Armenia, but without the Armenians." Primarily because of trust in France and Great Britain as associates of Russia, the Armenian National Council of the Russian Empire accepted the Tsar's offer. A representative meeting of Russian Armenians assembled in Tiflis, Caucasus, during August 1914. Tsar asked Armenian's loyalty and support for Russia in the conflict. The proposal was agreed upon and nearly 20,000 Armenians responded to the call, of which only 7,000 were given arms.

== Attendees ==
30 Armenian delegates from various Ottoman provinces, the Russian Empire, Europe, and the United States attended the Congress to discuss the ARF’s political agenda. Among the prominent participants in the congress were Arshak Vramian, E. Aknouni (Khatchatour Maloumian)., Rostom (Stepan Zorian), Ruben Zardarian, Simon Vratsian, Ruben Ter-Minasian, A. Okhikian (Slak), M. Terlemezyan, Hamazasp, A. Hanumyan, and Dr. Avedis Injejikian.

Additionally, the Ottoman government sent representatives Behaeddin Shakir, Ömer Naji (Omer Naci), and Naji Bey. An international entourage of peoples from the Caucasus also attended.

== Conclusion ==
While ARF delegates committed Ottoman Armenians to the defence of Ottoman territory (Western Armenia) in the event of a Russian invasion, they rejected calls for Armenians within the Russian Empire (Eastern Armenia) to launch an insurrection against the Tsarist regime from within. The ARF instead expressed solidarity in opposing a potential Russian invasion and encouraged Ottoman Armenians to fulfill their military obligations through conscription.

The ARF stated that "the congress cannot speak on behalf of the Armenians of Russia, as they are the subjects of another state", adding that "in case the Turkish government decides to join the war, Armenians of Turkey would carry out their responsibilities put on them as Turkish subjects – to serve the country in the army, protect the country just like the other subjects of the Empire”. In any case, appeals for Armenians within the Russian Empire to start incitement had little credibility as Ottoman failures toward their own Armenian population had undermined confidence in the CUP. The congress also advised the Ottoman government to not join the war, asserting that such an action would be disastrous for both the Ottoman government and the Armenian people.

The rejection by the Ottoman Armenians to start an insurrection from within the Russian Empire led to serious consequences for themselves, marking the end of dialogue between the ARF and the Ottoman Government and eventually culminating in the Armenian genocide. One of the Turkish government representatives, Bahaeddin Şakir, later to be become a chief architect of the Armenian Genocide, stated at the congress "This is high treason!". According to the Turkish-German historian Taner Akçam, the historical records used during the subsequent military tribunals against Ottoman war criminals, suggest that "the congress appears to have been simply a means to disguise the true purpose for traveling to Erzerum," which was "to form irregular units of the Special Organization." The transcripts indicate that Behaeddin Shakir, who held a lead role in the Special Organization wanted the ARF members leaving Erzerum at the conclusion of the congress to be "apprehended on the way and liquidated."

Learning of a possible conflict with Russian Armenians, the Ottoman government in September 1914 decided that the aliens (Russian Armenians) and Turkish Armenians would be a liability in a war against Russia. This incidentally proved of inestimable benefit to the Allies. For if the whole Armenian nation had gone against Russia, that country might have encountered defeat instead of victories early in the war. The Central Powers could have transferred large armies from the Eastern to the Western Front already in 1915 instead of 1917 with the result of such agreement.

It is claimed that the proposal was developed by the German Intelligence Bureau for the East, headquartered in Istanbul. The Intelligence Bureau for the East was established on the eve of World War I dedicated to promoting and sustaining subversive and nationalist agitations in the British Indian Empire and the Persian and Egyptian satellite states. It was involved in early plans for war and the Ottoman Caliph's decision to declare Jihad.

The Ottoman Empire dismantled the Armenian reform package on December 16, 1914, just after the first engagement of the Caucasus Campaign during the Bergmann Offensive on November 2, 1914. On the other side, the Tsar visited the Caucasus front on December 30, 1914, telling the head of the Armenian Church that "a most brilliant future awaits the Armenians".

== Legacy ==
The Erzurum negotiations challenge claims invoked by denialists of the Armenian genocide that the Armenian Revolutionary Federation (ARF) had constituted a pre-existing Armenian fifth column against the Ottoman Empire. The historian Dikran Kaligian states that "the documentary record...[supports that]....the CUP had unsuccessfully attempted to recruit the ARF into organizing Russian Armenians to form a fifth column behind Russian lines once the war began. A number of the authors mentioned...deny or diminish this fact because it undermines their contention that the deportation of the Armenian population was justified because the ARF organized such a rebellion behind Ottoman lines." The historian Raymond Kévorkian argues that the ARF's rejection was probably anticipated by the CUP, which "had probably not expected the ARF to respond any differently" and sought to lay the groundwork for a later propaganda campaign centered on Armenian "treachery". The historian Mark Levene places the episode within the wider wartime practice of states attempting to mobilize minorities inside enemy territory, describing an "inbuilt circularity" in accusations of minority insurgency because "all the belligerents were trying to foment exactly such uprisings among their enemies' 'subject' peoples."

== See also ==
- Armenian reform package
