= Yektan Turkyilmaz =

Turkish scholar

Yektan Türkyilmaz is a Kurdish scholar. Türkyilmaz holds a Ph.D. in history from Duke University with a specialization in the late Ottoman period.

Türkyilmaz is most well-known for being arrested as he attempted to leave Armenia after a research trip in June of 2005. The first individual of Turkish nationality who had been granted access to the National Archives of Armenia, Türkyilmaz was also one of the small number of intellectuals of Kurdish origin who had argued that Armenians as a group had been targeted for atrocities by the then Turkish government during and following 1915. His arrest, initially without charges, generated surprise and protests from circles in Turkey and also the United States, including from Richard Hovannisian of the University of California at Los Angeles and former US Senator Bob Dole. Türkyilmaz later said that the security officials who had arrested him appeared to think that he was involved in espionage, but he was eventually charged with illegally removing books and other materials that were more than fifty years old, which he had purchased in Armenia or which had been presented to him as gifts during his research. In August of 2005, Türkyilmaz was set free with a suspended sentence.
