= Justifying Genocide =

Book by Stefan Ihrig

Justifying Genocide: Germany and the Armenians from Bismarck to Hitler
- First edition
- Author: Stefan Ihrig
- Publication date: 2016

Justifying Genocide: Germany and the Armenians from Bismarck to Hitler is a 2016 book by Stefan Ihrig which explores how violence against the Ottoman Armenians, from the Hamidian massacres to the Armenian genocide, influenced German views and led to the acceptance of genocide as a legitimate solution to problems posed by an unwelcome minority. It discusses how the topic was debated in Germany after World War I and the influence of these debates and perceptions of history on the Holocaust.

== Content ==
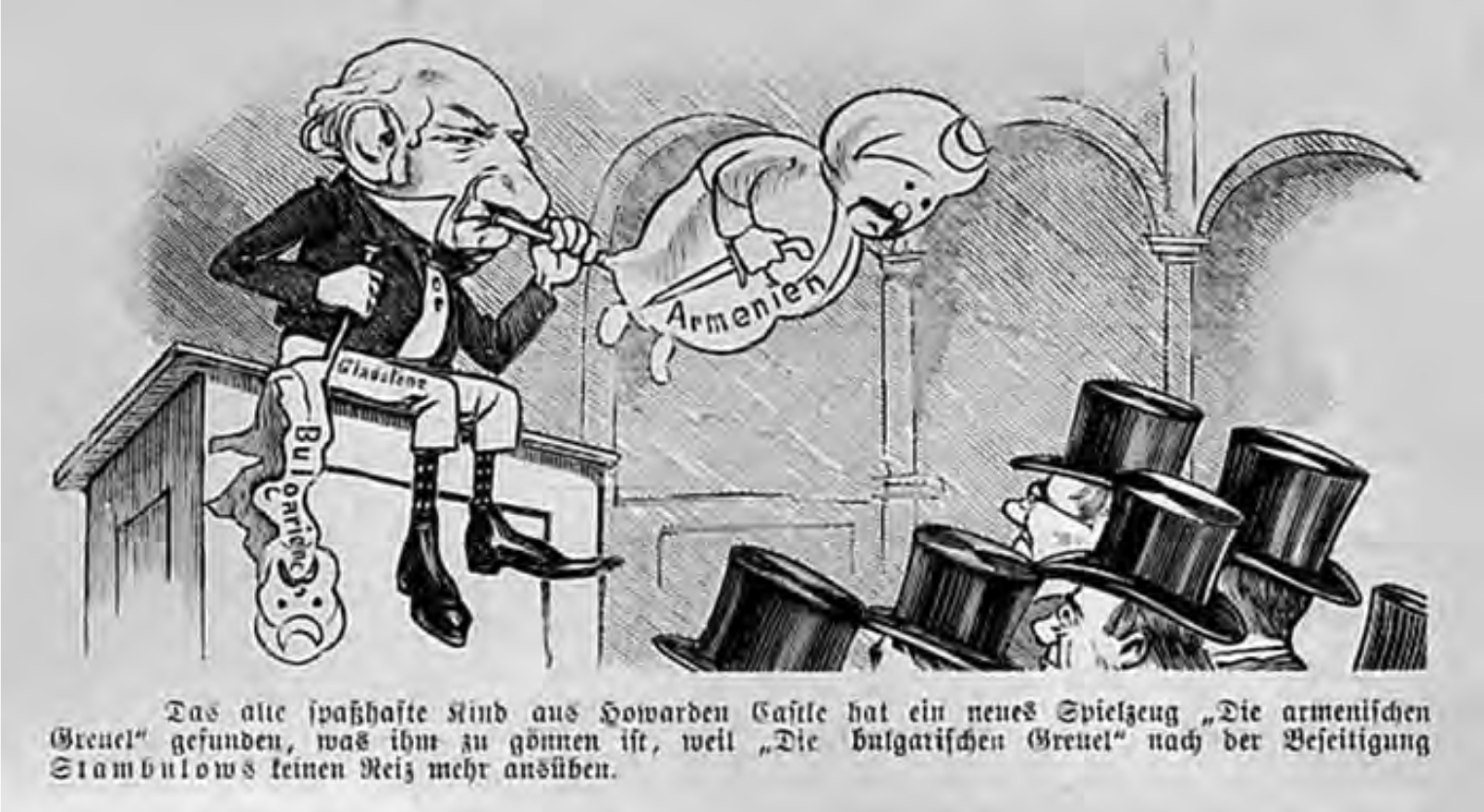
A political cartoon in Kladderadatsch, which depicts British statesman William Ewart Gladstone using first the April Uprising then the Hamidian massacres to drum up support against the Ottoman Empire

The book expands on Ihrig's previous book, Atatürk in the Nazi Imagination (2014), and is based on examination of contemporary German publications. Ihrig writes that his book is about "Germany and its road to the Holocaust", and only secondarily about Turks or Armenians. The book covers the period from the 1878 Treaty of San Stefano through World War II; Ihrig argues that the German media took a consistently pro-Turkish line in justifying massacres of Armenians throughout this period.

Ihrig chronicles how the German chancellor, Otto von Bismarck, encouraged the Ottoman rulers resist implementing the Armenian reforms envisioned in the 1878 treaty. Ihrig writes that Bismarck saw the Ottoman Empire as a "land of political opportunity" befitting German interests and tried to keep it intact for that reason. During the 1890s, the German press reported extensively on the Hamidian massacres of Armenians, labeling them "Völkermord" (the German word for genocide) decades before the term genocide was coined in English. In order to its build its relationship with the Ottoman Empire, the German government defended the massacres as justified. By the 1890s, Ihrig finds a consistent anti-Armenianism in the German press (especially right-wing media), which he compares to antisemitism. Anti-Armenian books such as those by Karl May, Hans Barth, and Alfred Körte were also published.

Iconic image of Armenian refugees, taken by German medic Armin Wegner and revealed to the German public in a 1919 lecture

During the Armenian genocide, Ihrig states that Germany could have known "everything" about the fate of the Armenians as it was ongoing. However, the German press repeated uncritically denial of the genocide by German officials long after the facts were widely known, as well as justification and rationalization of the killings. Although Ihrig rejects the claim (proposed by Vahakn Dadrian) that the genocide resulted from a joint German–Ottoman decision, Ihrig concludes that Germany made the decision to "sacrifice the Armenians as the price of preserving Ottoman goodwill toward Germany".

Ihrig covers the 1921 trial of Soghomon Tehlirian for the Assassination of Talat Pasha in Berlin, which raised the profile of the genocide in Germany. Many newspapers began to use the word Völkermord or the formula Ausrottung eines Volkes (extermination of a people) in the modern meaning of "genocide", as opposed to the less specific terms of "Armenian Horrors" or "Armenian massacres". However, according to Ihrig, acknowledgment of genocide did not translate into condemnation, instead it led to the victory of the faction that portrayed the genocide as necessary and justified, primarily because the Armenians were judged to have stabbed the Ottoman Empire in the back. For many German nationalists in the Weimar Republic, Ihrig writes, "genocide was a 'reasonable,' 'justifiable,' if not unavoidable cost of doing political and military business in the twentieth century". On the other hand, Ihrig profiles Franz Werfel, Armin Wegner, Max Erwin von Scheubner-Richter, and Johannes Lepsius, who fought to inform the public about the Armenian plight and help Armenians, and some whom also attempted to ward off the rise of Nazism.

Ihrig considers the Armenian genocide to be the "double original sin" of the twentieth century, first because it happened, and second because it went unpunished; thus it is, according to Ihrig, a sin not only of the perpetrators but also the bystanders. He concludes that "There can be no doubt that the Nazis had incorporated the Armenian Genocide, its 'lessons,' tactics, and 'benefits,' into their own worldview and their view of the new racial order they were building." Although he does not go as far as to state that Nazis were directly inspired by the Armenian Genocide to commit the Holocaust, he does state that they admired the Turkish use of genocide as a tool of national rebirth, creating a "postgenocidal paradise".

== Reviews ==
Kirkus Reviews calls the book "A groundbreaking academic study that shows how Germany derived from the Armenian genocide 'a plethora of recipes' to address its own ethnic problems". Hungarian historian Péter Pál Kránitz states that "Ihrig's findings are significant for international scholars of genocide and the Holocaust". Armenian political scientist Vahram Ter-Matevosyan credits Ihrig with challenging "the deep-seated concepts and approaches about the Armenian Genocide discourse". Vahagn Avedian states that Ihrig conducted "meticulous research" and produced "a highly welcomed contribution to the field of genocide studies". Lawrence Douglas considers the book fascinating, highly readable, and convincing.

German historian Jürgen Zimmerer states that Ihrig's study rests on intentionalist assumptions (that the Holocaust was ideologically based and planned in advance), a theory which is by no means completely accepted among scholars of the Holocaust. Nevertheless, he considers the book "important and inspiring" especially for historians of Germany. According to historian Jo Laycock, Ihrig's book is "the most detailed and wide ranging analysis to date of the evolution of German representations of the Armenians and responses to the Armenian Genocide of 1915".

== Awards ==
The book received the 2017 Dr. Sona Aronian Book Prize for Excellence in Armenian Studies by the National Association for Armenian Studies and Research.
