= Bucerius Institute for Research of Contemporary German History and Society =

German research institute at the University of Haifa

Coordinates: 32°45′46.2″N 35°1′5.6″E

- Founded: 2001
- Founder: ZEIT-Stiftung
- Type: Academic Institute
- Purpose: Research and Academic Exchange
- Location: University of Haifa, Israel
- Key people: Director: Amos Morris-Reich; Founder and Former Director: Yfaat Weiss
- Website: bucerius.haifa.ac.il

The Bucerius Institute for Research of Contemporary German History and Society at the University of Haifa was founded in 2001. The institute was started by the ZEIT-Stiftung Ebelin und Gerd Bucerius and Professor Dres. h.c. Manfred Lahnstein. The institute is committed to the research of social and historical issues of contemporary Germany. The founder and first director of the institute was Yfaat Weiss. Since 2008, Amos Morris-Reich has been the director of the Bucerius Institute.

== Research ==
The thematic and methodological variety of topics that the institute's program has encompassed over the past decade has included identity, migration, integration, multiculturalism, citizenship and liberalism, "race", science and history in a German, Israeli and European context. The Bucerius Institute aims to involve different historical time periods and fields to show Jewish and German history while presenting complex aspects of the convoluted history of contemporary Germany.
The institute has become an important source of information about specific developments in post-war Germany, and in Europe in general. This information is regularly used by students and scholars at the University of Haifa and the general public.

== Academic and public activities ==
The Institute annually organizes conferences, workshops and guest lectures, such as "Queer experiences during the Third Reich and the Holocaust" and "Concepts of "Race" in the Humanities", and contributing in initiating scholarly discussions. Wolf Biermann, Josef Joffe, and Rita Süssmuth lectured during special events at the institute.
Occasionally, the Institute arranges events, including film festivals and music shows, which attract a large audience from outside the University. In 2007, the institute was part in the organization of a DEFA/GDR film festival relating to the topic "German Cinema from behind the Iron Curtain" and, in 2008, hosted a musical drama with the title "The Myth and the Real Life of Marlene Dietrich".

== Scholarship and academic exchange ==
The Institute contributes towards the research of contemporary Germany in Israel and towards collaborations with scholars from both Israel and abroad.
The Bucerius Institute has partnerships with several international institutions, including the Hamburg Institute for Social Research, the University of Jena, the Institute for the History of the German Jews, Leo Baeck Institute and other institutes in Germany and Israel.

== Publications ==
In March 2005, the Bucerius Institute published "Memory and Amnesia: The Holocaust in Germany", edited by Gilad Margalit and Yfaat Weiss (in Hebrew). This volume represents the final product of a weekly workshop organized by the Bucerius Institute in 2001/2002 by leading researchers of the Holocaust in Israel, Germany, Europe and the United States. The workshop used historiography, literary genres and cinematography to analyze the master narratives of the victim, perpetrator and bystander in works dealing with the Holocaust. Furthermore, some essays from the conference "Europe and Israel: What Next?", regarding "Remigration," have been included in the "Leo Baeck Institute Year Book 2004". In addition, the Institute published the results of its conference "Deadly Neighbors" in one issue of the journal "Mittelweg 36. The Journal of the Hamburg Institute for Social Research."
There are numerous publications of associate members of the Institute dealing with the current history of Germany and the relationship between Jews and Non-Jews in Germany, Europe and Israel.
