= Stefan Ihrig =

Historian

- Occupations: Professor, historian
- Spouse: Roni Malkai Ihrig
- Parent(s): Johann and Beate Ihrig

Academic background
- Education: Queen Mary University (BA); Free University of Berlin (MA); University of Cambridge (PhD)
- Doctoral advisor: Richard J. Evans

Academic work
- Notable works: Atatürk in the Nazi Imagination (2014); Justifying Genocide: Germany and the Armenians from Bismarck to Hitler (2016)
- Website: www.stefanihrig.com

Stefan Ihrig is an academic, author, and speaker. He is professor of history at the University of Haifa and director of the Haifa Center for German and European Studies. His research interests are European and Middle Eastern history, with a focus on media and political and social discourse. His 2014 and 2016 books dealing with German-Turkish history and entanglement have elicited critical praise. He is also an editor of the Journal of Holocaust Research published by the University of Haifa and has contributed articles for HuffPost, Tablet, Haaretz, and History Today, among other publications.

== Early life and education ==
Ihrig is the son of Johann and Beate Ihrig. He earned his bachelor's degree in law and politics at Queen Mary University, London. He received his master's degree in history, Turcology, and political science from the Free University of Berlin. He completed his PhD in history at the University of Cambridge. His doctoral thesis on German-Turkish relations in the 20th century was supervised by Sir Richard J. Evans.

== Academic career ==
Before joining the University of Haifa, Ihrig was a Polonsky Fellow at the Van Leer Jerusalem Institute, a lecturer at the University of Regensburg and the Free University of Berlin, and a researcher at the Georg Eckert Institute in Braunschweig.

== Research and publications ==
Ihrig's first individually-authored book, published in 2008, was Wer sind die Moldawier? Rumänismus versus Moldowanismus in Historiographie und Geschichtsschulbüchern der Republik Moldova ("Who are the Moldovans? Romanianism versus Moldovanism in Historiography and History Textbooks of the Republic of Moldova"). Reviewer Matthew H. Ciscel states that the book is "broadly detailed and well-written" and Dietmar Müller describes it as "an impressive study on historiography and history politics in the Republic of Moldova based on a wide range of sources".

Ihrig's recent research has focused on the reception of the Ottoman Empire and Turkey in Germany, and he has published two books on the subject: Atatürk in the Nazi Imagination (2014) and Justifying Genocide: Germany and the Armenians from Bismarck to Hitler (2016), both published by Harvard University Press. According to Ihrig, there was a Nazi "fandom" of Atatürk, the founder of the Republic of Turkey, and the Nazis admired the "postgenocidal paradise" of Atatürk's New Turkey and sought to emulate it. Ihrig states that the Armenian genocide has been held hostage by the politics of Armenian genocide denial and Armenian genocide recognition, which has prevented the event from being integrated into twentieth-century world history. Ihrig states that the Armenian genocide was the "double original sin" of the twentieth century, explaining:

Putting the Armenian genocide in its rightful place in the history of the world and of Europe is not an easy task and must lead to a radical revision of the twentieth century. The Armenian genocide was a very important alarm that the world has not heeded. The world knew but it was the wrong people who drew the right conclusions: that you can get away with oppression, violence and mass murder with impunity.

== Other activities ==
Ihrig is one of the editors of the Journal of Holocaust Research published by the University of Haifa. He has also contributed articles for HuffPost, Tablet magazine, Haaretz, and History Today, among other publications.

== Awards and honors ==
Ihrig's 2014 book Atatürk in the Nazi Imagination earned an official commendation in the 2013 Fraenkel Prize Competition sponsored by the Wiener Library for the Study of the Holocaust and Genocide in London. His 2016 work Justifying Genocide: Germany and the Armenians from Bismarck to Hitler won the 2017 Sona Aronian Book Prize for Excellence in Armenian Studies from the National Association for Armenian Studies and Research.

== Personal life ==
Ihrig's wife, Roni Malkai Ihrig, is an attorney and CEO of the Israeli Public Forum for Youth Villages and Boarding Schools for Children at Risk.

== Bibliography ==
=== Books ===
- Carnevale, R.; Ihrig, S.; Weiss, C. (2005). Europa am Bosporus (er-)finden? Die Diskussion um den Beitritt der Türkei zur Europäischen Union in den britischen, deutschen, französischen und italienischen Zeitungen – Eine Presseanalyse. Peter Lang.
- Ihrig, Stefan (2008). Wer sind die Moldawier? Rumänismus versus Moldowanismus in Historiographie und Geschichtsschulbüchern der Republik Moldova, 1991-2006. Ibidem Press. ISBN 978-3-89821-466-7
- Ihrig, Stefan (2012). Nazi Perceptions of the New Turkey, 1919-1945 (PhD thesis). University of Cambridge.
- Ihrig, Stefan (2014). Atatürk in the Nazi Imagination. Harvard University Press. ISBN 978-0-674-74485-1.
- Ihrig, Stefan (2016). Justifying Genocide: Germany and the Armenians from Bismarck to Hitler. Harvard University Press. ISBN 978-0-674-50479-0.
- Ihrig Stefan (2023), Giustificare il Genocidio. La Germania, gli Armeni e gli Ebrei da Bismarck a Hitler, Guerini e Associati, edizione italiana a cura di Antonia Arslan, ISBN 978-88-6250-865-0

=== Selected articles and book chapters ===
- "Rediscovering History, Rediscovering Ultimate Truth History, Textbooks, Identity and Politics in Moldova". Reports from the International Symposium Held at Komaba Campus, the University of Tokyo (November 12th, 2005). Center for German and European Studies. n.d. CiteSeerX 10.1.1.556.1788.
- "The Hyperreality of the Empty Page: Disappeared Ethnic Minorities in the History Textbooks of Turkey and of the Republic of Moldova". Annals of the Young Historians Association of Moldova. 2005.
- Ihrig, Stefan (2007). "Democracy (Dis)Connected - Discourses Of Democracy And Of The Inter-War Period As (Mis)Guiding Lights In The History Textbooks Moldova and Romania". Ceu Political Science Journal (1). Central European University Political Science Journal: 27–43.
- "No more Eastern Questions asked – Southeastern Europe as just another European periphery in British history textbooks". Studien zur internationalen Schulbuchforschung [Studies on International Textbook Research]. Vol. 118. Hahn. 2007. pp. 121–143. ISBN 978-3-88304-318-0.
- "(Un)civic discourses and their discontents – Moldovanist and Romanianist concepts of the nation and its citizens in the current history textbooks and historiography of the Republic of Moldova (1991-2006)". Gesellschaften und Staaten im Epochenwandel [Societies and States in the Change of Epochs]. Vol. 16. Lang. 2008. pp. 149–163. ISBN 978-3-631-57671-7.
- Dimou, Augusta, ed. (2009). "Moldavian Nightmares or 'Historical deadlock at birth': History, identity and history teaching in the Republic of Moldavia (1991–2008)". Transition‹ and the Politics of History Education in Southeast Europe. Vandenhoeck & Ruprecht. ISBN 9783862340668.
- Ihrig, Stefan (2011). "The History of European Fascism - Origins, Foreign Relations and (Dis)Entangled Histories". European History Quarterly. 41 (2): 278–290. doi:10.1177/0265691411402440. S2CID 145177101.
- Ihrig, Stefan (2018). "Germany and the 1890s Armenian massacres: Questions of Morality in Foreign Policy". Études arméniennes contemporaines (11): 75–92. doi:10.4000/eac.1871.
