= Armenian genocide =

Systematic campaign in the Ottoman Empire

- Part of World War I
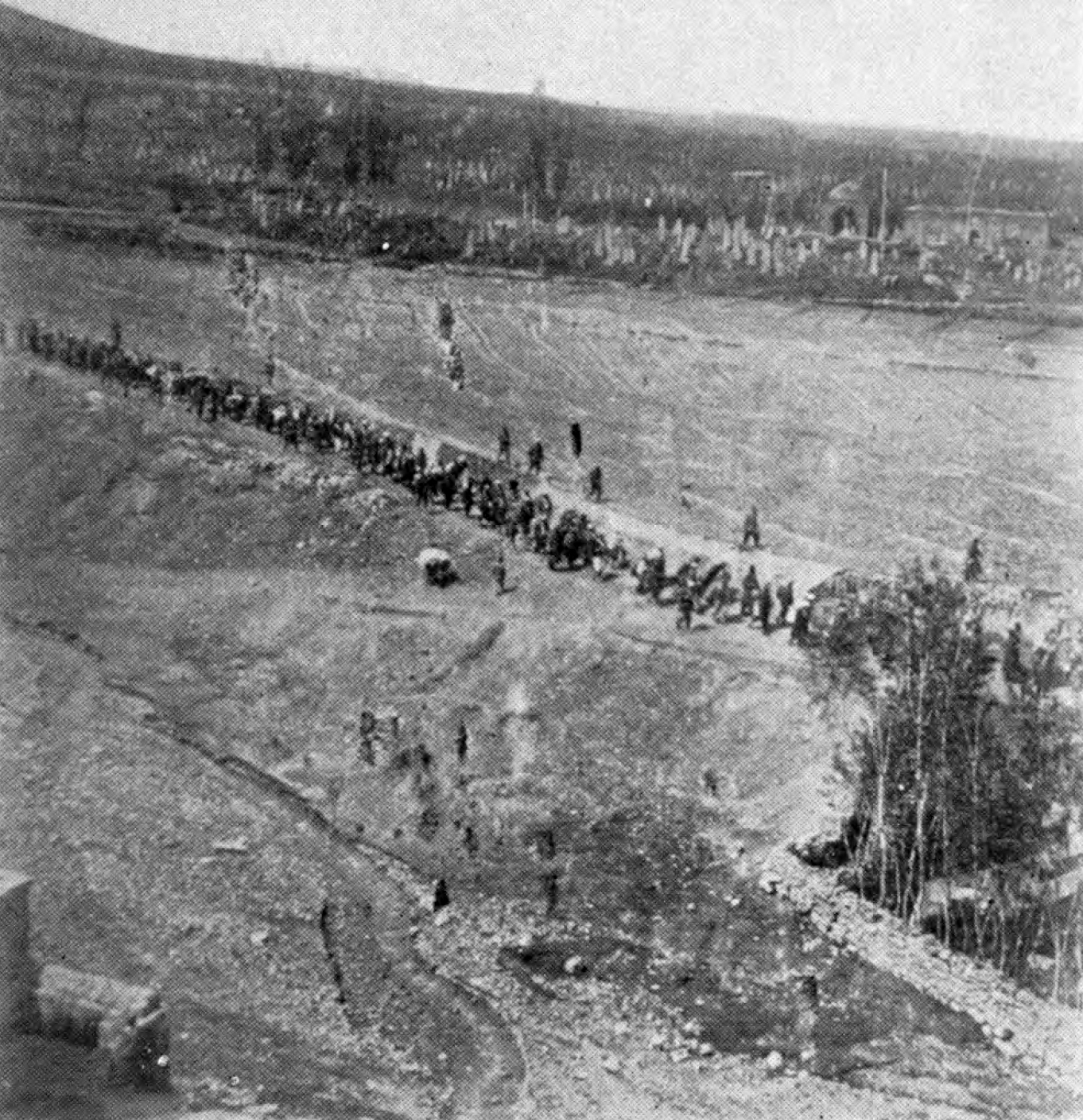
- Column of Armenian deportees guarded by gendarmes in Harput vilayet
- Location: Ottoman Empire
- Date: 1915–1917
- Target: Ottoman Armenians
- Attack type: Genocide, death march, Islamization
- Deaths: 600,000–1.5 million
- Perpetrator: Committee of Union and Progress

The Armenian genocide (Note: Also known by other names.) was the systematic destruction of the Armenian people and identity in the Ottoman Empire during World War I. Spearheaded by the ruling Committee of Union and Progress (CUP), it was implemented primarily through the mass murder of around one million Armenians during death marches from the Turkish-dominated Anatolia to the Syrian desert and the forced Islamization of others, primarily women and children. Alongside the concurrent Assyrian and Greek genocides, the Armenian genocide enabled the creation of an ethnonationalist Turkish state, the Republic of Turkey.

Before World War I, Armenians occupied a somewhat protected, but subordinate, place in Ottoman society. Large-scale massacres of Armenians had occurred in the 1890s and 1909. The Ottoman Empire suffered a series of military defeats and territorial losses, especially during the 1912–1913 Balkan Wars. CUP leaders turned to radical Turkish nationalism to preserve the empire and grew paranoid that Armenians, whose homeland in Anatolia they considered the Turkish nation's last refuge, would seek independence. During their invasion of Russian and Persian territory in 1914, Ottoman paramilitaries massacred local Armenians. Authorities took isolated instances of Armenian resistance as evidence of a widespread rebellion and decided to permanently forestall the possibility of Armenian autonomy or independence.

On 24 April 1915, Ottoman authorities arrested and deported hundreds of Armenian intellectuals and leaders from Constantinople. At the orders of Talaat Pasha, an estimated 800,000 to 1.2 million Armenians were sent on death marches to the Syrian desert in 1915 and 1916. Driven forward by paramilitary escorts, the deportees were deprived of food and water and subjected to robbery, rape, and massacres; survivors were dispersed into concentration camps. In 1916, another wave of massacres was ordered, leaving about 200,000 deportees alive by the end of the year. Around 100,000 to 200,000 Armenian women and children were forcibly converted to Islam and integrated into Muslim households, while Armenian properties were confiscated to build a national economy. State-sponsored killings mostly ceased by early 1917, though Turkish nationalists continued massacres and ethnic cleansing of survivors through the Turkish War of Independence after World War I.

Regarded as "the apex of horrors conceivable" before World War II, the genocide destroyed more than two thousand years of Armenian civilization in eastern Anatolia. Efforts to prosecute the perpetrators were largely unsuccessful and ended after the Treaty of Lausanne established Turkey's borders in 1923. While almost all historians and scholars outside of Turkey accept the genocide as a historical fact, the Turkish government maintains that the deportation of Armenians was a legitimate action that cannot be described as genocide and lobbies against recognition. As of 2026, 36 countries have recognized the genocide, concurring with the academic consensus.

== Background ==
=== Armenians in the Ottoman Empire ===
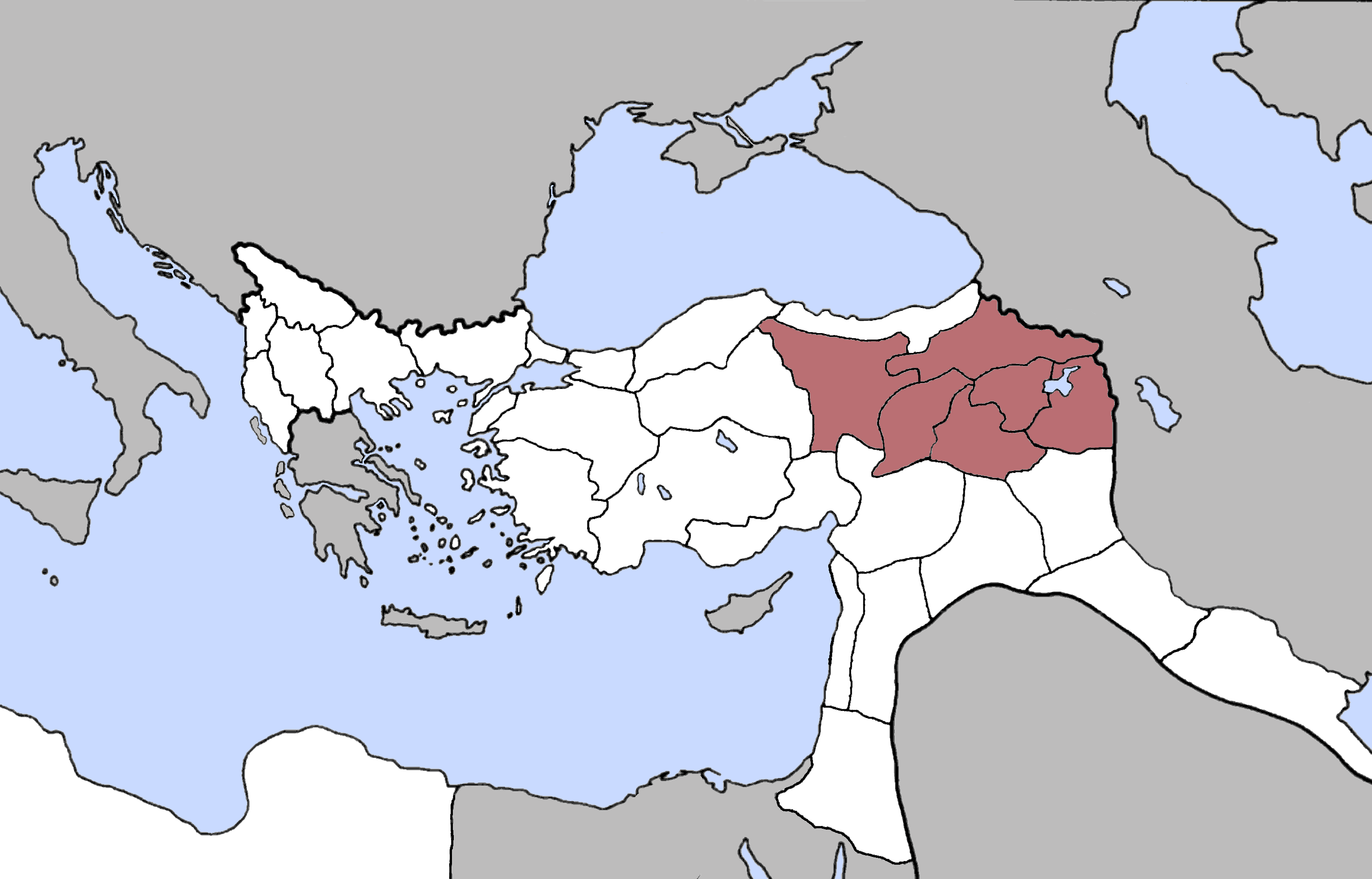
The Six Vilayets: Bitlis, Diyarbekir, Erzerum, Harput, Sivas and Van. Most villages populated by Armenians were in these provinces.

The presence of Armenians in Anatolia has been documented since the sixth century BCE, about 1,500 years before the arrival of Turkmens under the Seljuk dynasty. The Kingdom of Armenia adopted Christianity as its national religion in the fourth century CE, establishing the Armenian Apostolic Church. Following the end of the Byzantine Empire in 1453, two Islamic empires—the Ottoman Empire and the Iranian Safavid Empire—contested Western Armenia, which was permanently separated from Eastern Armenia (held by the Safavids) by the 1639 Treaty of Zuhab. The Ottoman Empire was multiethnic and multireligious, and its millet system offered non-Muslims a subordinate but protected place in society. Sharia law encoded Islamic superiority but guaranteed property rights and freedom of worship to non-Muslims (dhimmis) in exchange for a special tax.

On the eve of World War I in 1914, around two million Armenians lived in Ottoman territory, mostly in Anatolia, a region with a total population of 15–17.5 million. According to the Armenian Patriarchate's estimates for 1913–1914, there were 2,925 Armenian towns and villages in the Ottoman Empire, of which 2,084 were in the Armenian highlands adjacent to the Russian border. Armenians were a minority in most places where they lived, alongside Turkish and Kurdish Muslim and Greek Orthodox Christian neighbors. According to the Patriarchate's figure, 215,131 Armenians lived in urban areas, especially Constantinople, Smyrna, and Eastern Thrace. Although most Ottoman Armenians were peasant farmers, they were overrepresented in commerce. As middleman minorities, despite the wealth of some Armenians, their overall political power was low, making them especially vulnerable.

=== Land conflict and reforms ===
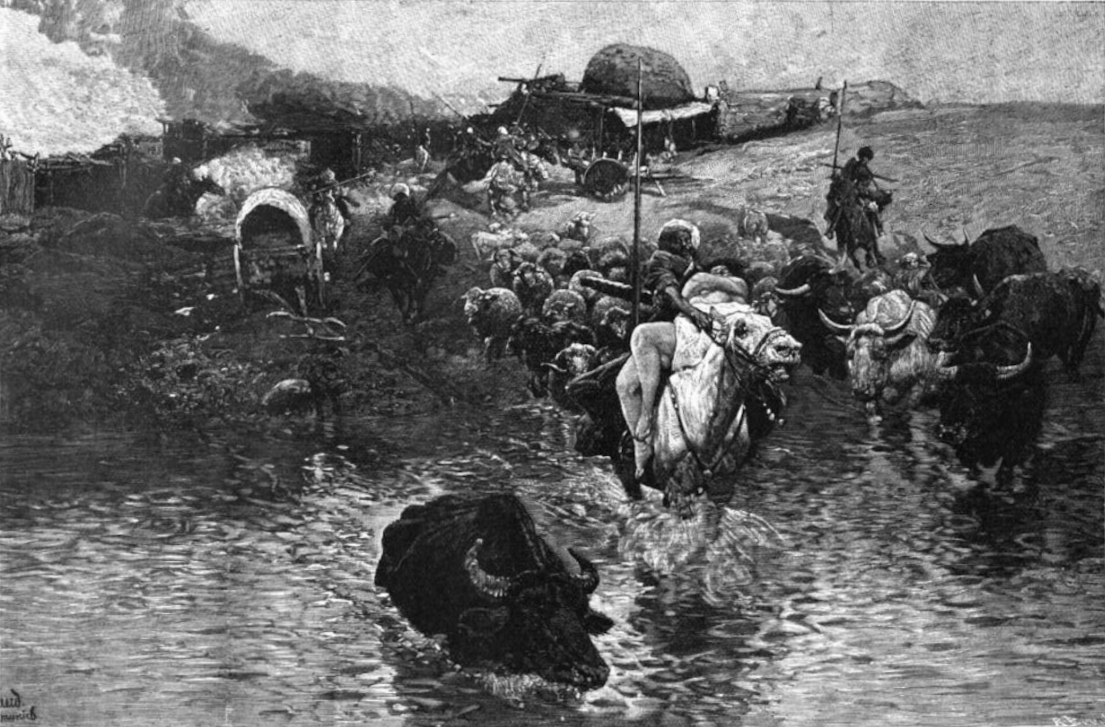
"Looting of an Armenian village by the Kurds", 1898 or 1899

Armenians in the eastern provinces lived in semi-feudal conditions and commonly encountered forced labor, illegal taxation, and unpunished crimes against them including robberies, murders, and sexual assaults. Beginning in 1839, the Ottoman government issued a series of reforms to centralize power and equalize the status of Ottoman subjects regardless of religion. The reforms to equalize the status of non-Muslims were strongly opposed by Islamic clergy and Muslims in general, and remained mostly theoretical. Because of the abolition of the Kurdish emirates in the mid-nineteenth century, the Ottoman government began to directly tax Armenian peasants who had previously paid taxes only to Kurdish landlords. The latter continued to exact levies illegally.

From the mid-nineteenth century, Armenians faced large-scale land usurpation as a consequence of the sedentarization of Kurdish tribes and the arrival of Muslim refugees and immigrants (mainly Circassians) following the Russo-Circassian War. In 1876, when Sultan Abdul Hamid II came to power, the state began to confiscate Armenian-owned land in the eastern provinces and give it to Muslim immigrants as part of a systematic policy to reduce the Armenian population of these areas. This policy lasted until World War I. These conditions led to a substantial decline in the population of the Armenian highlands; 300,000 Armenians left the empire, and others moved to towns. Some Armenians joined revolutionary political parties, of which the most influential was the Armenian Revolutionary Federation (ARF), founded in 1890. These parties primarily sought reform within the empire and found only limited support from Ottoman Armenians.

Russia's decisive victory in the 1877–1878 war forced the Ottoman Empire to cede parts of eastern Anatolia, the Balkans, and Cyprus. Under international pressure at the 1878 Congress of Berlin, the Ottoman government agreed to carry out reforms and guarantee the physical safety of its Armenian subjects, but there was no enforcement mechanism; conditions continued to worsen. The Congress of Berlin marked the emergence of the Armenian question in international diplomacy as Armenians were for the first time used by the Great Powers to interfere in Ottoman politics. Although Armenians had been called the "loyal millet" in contrast to Greeks and others who had previously challenged Ottoman rule, the authorities began to perceive Armenians as a threat after 1878. In 1891, Abdul Hamid created the Hamidiye regiments from Kurdish tribes, allowing them to act with impunity against Armenians. From 1895 to 1896 the empire saw widespread massacres; at least 100,000 Armenians were killed primarily by Ottoman soldiers and mobs let loose by the authorities. Many Armenian villages were forcibly converted to Islam. The Ottoman state bore ultimate responsibility for the killings, whose purpose was violently restoring the previous social order in which Christians would unquestioningly accept Muslim supremacy, and forcing Armenians to emigrate, thereby decreasing their numbers.

=== Young Turk Revolution ===
Abdul Hamid's despotism prompted the formation of an opposition movement, the Young Turks, which sought to overthrow him and restore the 1876 Constitution of the Ottoman Empire, which he had suspended in 1877. One faction of the Young Turks was the secret and revolutionary Committee of Union and Progress (CUP), based in Salonica, from which the charismatic conspirator Mehmed Talaat (later Talaat Pasha (Note: Talaat previously had the title "Bey", and so was known as "Talaat Bey" until he gained the title "Pasha" in 1917.)) emerged as a leading member. Although skeptical of a growing, exclusionary Turkish nationalism in the Young Turk movement, the ARF decided to ally with the CUP in December 1907. In 1908, the CUP came to power in the Young Turk Revolution, which began with a string of CUP assassinations of leading officials in Macedonia. Abdul Hamid was forced to reinstate the 1876 constitution and restore the Ottoman parliament, which was celebrated by Ottomans of all ethnicities and religions. Security improved in parts of the eastern provinces after 1908 and the CUP took steps to reform the local gendarmerie, although tensions remained high. Despite an agreement to reverse the land usurpation of the previous decades in the 1910 Salonica Accord between the ARF and the CUP, the latter made no efforts to carry this out.

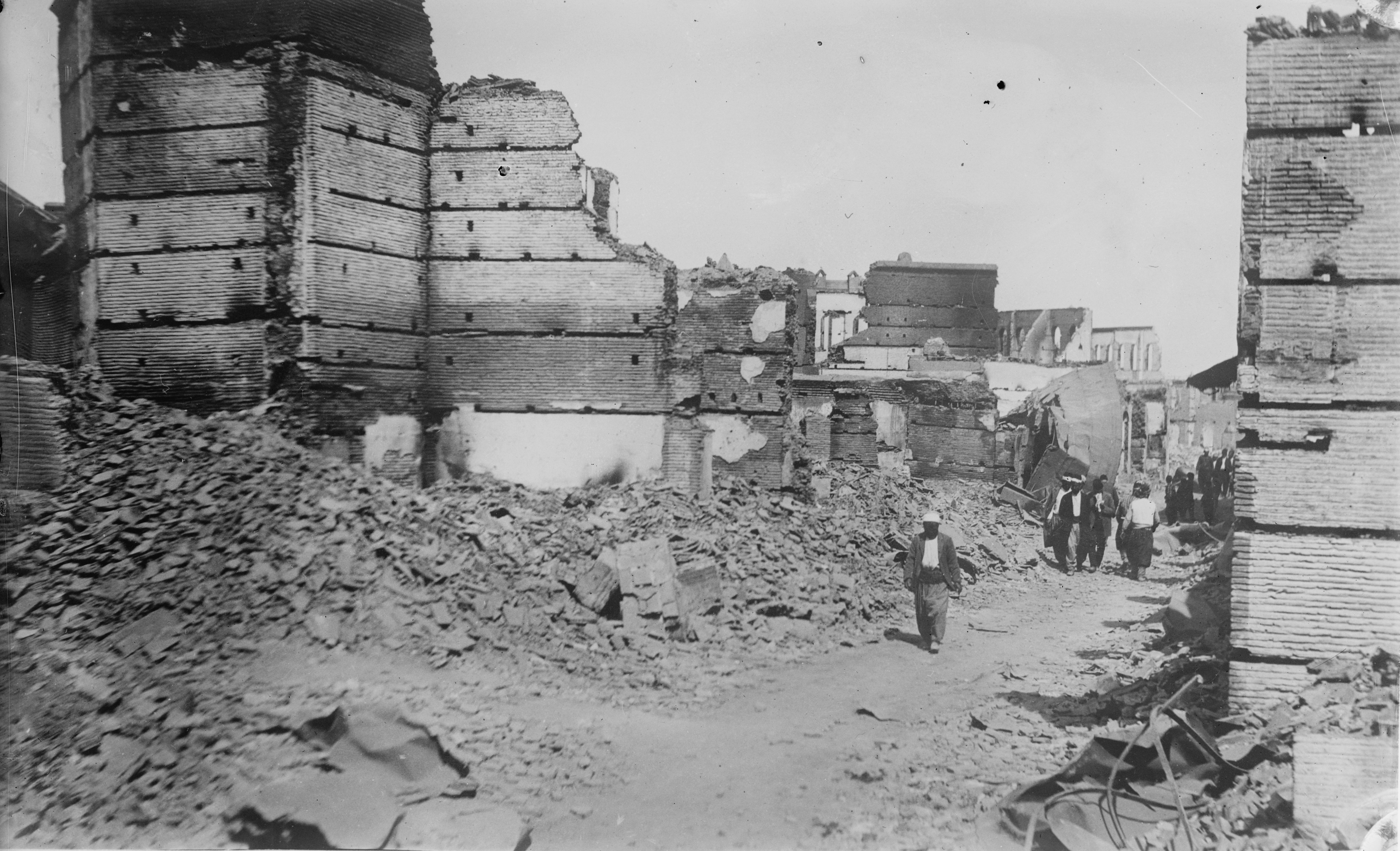
The Armenian quarter of Adana after the 1909 massacres

In early 1909 an unsuccessful countercoup was launched by conservatives and some liberals who opposed the CUP's increasingly repressive governance. When news of the countercoup reached Adana, armed Muslims attacked the Armenian quarter and Armenians returned fire. Ottoman soldiers did not protect Armenians and instead armed the rioters. Between 20,000 and 25,000 people, mostly Armenians, were killed in Adana and nearby towns. Unlike the 1890s massacres, the events were not organized by the central government but instigated by local officials, intellectuals, and Islamic clerics, including CUP supporters in Adana. Although the massacres went unpunished, the ARF continued to hope that reforms to improve security and restore lands were forthcoming, until late 1912, when they broke with the CUP and appealed to the European powers. On 8 February 1914, the CUP reluctantly agreed to reforms brokered by Germany that provided for the appointment of two European inspectors for the entire Ottoman east and putting the Hamidiye regiments in reserve. CUP leaders feared that these reforms, which were never implemented, could lead to partition and cited them as a reason for the elimination of the Armenian population in 1915.

=== Balkan Wars ===
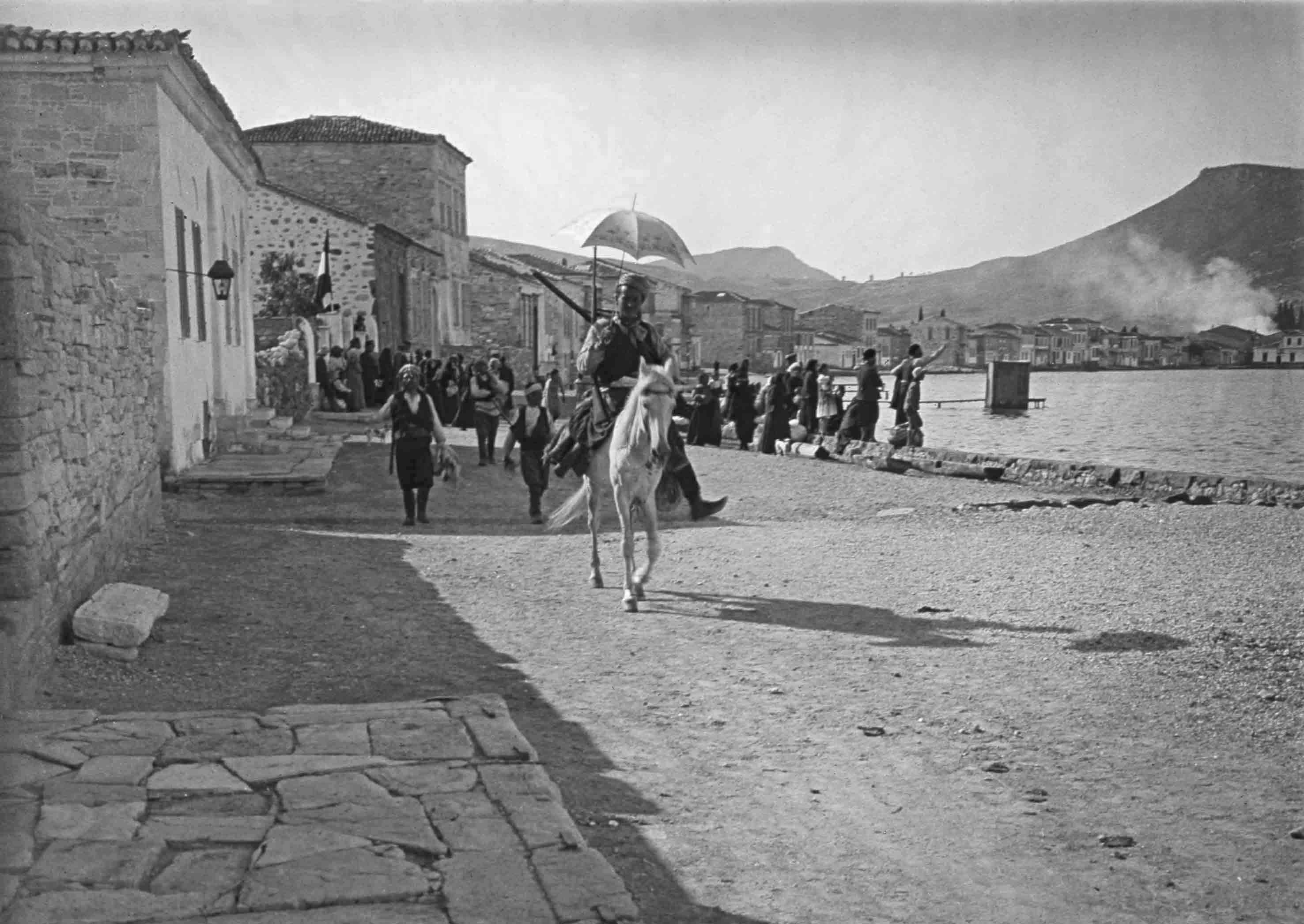
Muslim bandits parading with loot in Phocaea (modern-day Foça, Turkey) on 13 June 1914. In the background are Greek refugees and burning buildings.

The 1912 First Balkan War resulted in the loss of almost all of the empire's European territory and the mass expulsion of Muslims from the Balkans. Ottoman Muslim society was incensed by the atrocities committed against Balkan Muslims, intensifying anti-Christian sentiment and leading to a desire for revenge. Blame for the loss was assigned to all Christians, including the Ottoman Armenians, many of whom had fought on the Ottoman side. The Balkan Wars put an end to the Ottomanist movement for pluralism and coexistence; instead, the CUP turned to an increasingly radical Turkish nationalism to preserve the empire. CUP leaders such as Talaat and Enver Pasha came to blame non-Muslim population concentrations in strategic areas for many of the empire's problems, concluding by mid-1914 that they were internal tumors to be excised. Of these, Ottoman Armenians were considered the most dangerous, because CUP leaders feared that their homeland in Anatolia—claimed as the last refuge of the Turkish nation—would break away from the empire as the Balkans had.

In January 1913, the CUP launched another coup, installed a one-party state, and strictly repressed all real or perceived internal enemies. After the coup, the CUP shifted the demography of border areas by resettling Balkan Muslim refugees while coercing Christians to emigrate; immigrants were promised property that had belonged to Christians. When parts of Eastern Thrace were reoccupied by the Ottoman Empire during the Second Balkan War in mid-1913, there was a campaign of looting and intimidation against Greeks and Armenians, forcing many to emigrate. Around 150,000 Greek Orthodox from the Aegean coast were forcibly deported in May and June 1914 by Muslim bandits, who were secretly backed by the CUP and sometimes joined by the regular army. Historian Matthias Bjørnlund states that the perceived success of the Greek deportations allowed CUP leaders to envision even more radical policies "as yet another extension of a policy of social engineering through Turkification".

== Ottoman entry into World War I ==
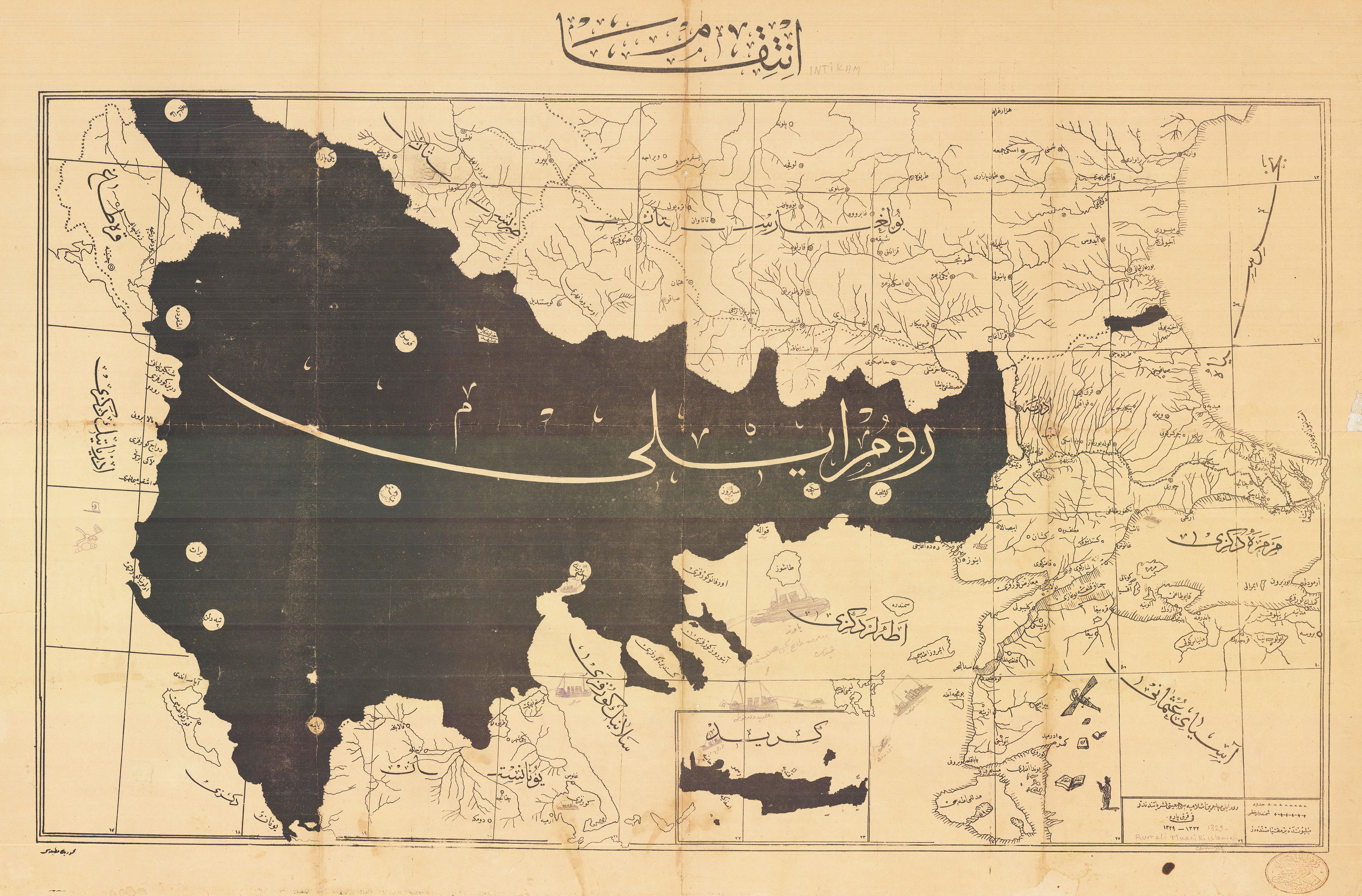
"Revenge" (Ottoman Turkish: انتقام) map highlighting territory lost during and after the Balkan Wars in black

A few days after the outbreak of World War I, the CUP concluded an alliance with Germany on 2 August 1914. The same month, CUP representatives went to an ARF conference demanding that, in the event of war with Russia, the ARF incite Russian Armenians to intervene on the Ottoman side. Instead, the delegates resolved that Armenians should fight for the countries of their citizenships. During its war preparations, the Ottoman government recruited thousands of prisoners to join the paramilitary Special Organization, which initially focused on stirring up revolts among Muslims behind Russian lines beginning before the empire officially entered the war. On 29 October 1914, the empire entered World War I on the side of the Central Powers by launching a surprise attack on Russian ports in the Black Sea. Many Russian Armenians were enthusiastic about the war, but Ottoman Armenians were more ambivalent, afraid that supporting Russia would bring retaliation. Organization of Armenian volunteer units by Russian Armenians, later joined by some Ottoman Armenian deserters, further increased Ottoman suspicions against their Armenian population.

Wartime requisitions were often corrupt and arbitrary, and disproportionately targeted Greeks and Armenians. Armenian leaders urged young men to accept conscription into the army, but many soldiers of all ethnicities and religions deserted due to difficult conditions and concern for their families. At least ten percent of Ottoman Armenians were mobilized, leaving their communities bereft of fighting-age men and therefore largely unable to organize armed resistance to deportation in 1915. During the Ottoman invasion of Russian and Persian territory, Caucasus, General Myshlayevsky, ordered the evacuation of Urmia and Tabriz. Ottoman and Kurdish forces led by the tribal leader Agha Simko Shikak filled the vacuum in January 1915 and massacred the local Armenians and Assyrian/Syriac Christians. Beginning in November 1914, provincial governors of Van, Bitlis, and Erzerum sent many telegrams to the central government pressing for more severe measures against the Armenians, both regionally and throughout the empire. These requests were endorsed by the central government already before 1915. Armenian civil servants were dismissed from their posts in late 1914 and early 1915. In February 1915, the CUP leaders decided to disarm Armenians serving in the army and transfer them to labor battalions. The Armenian soldiers in labor battalions were systematically executed, although many skilled workers were spared until 1916.

== Onset ==
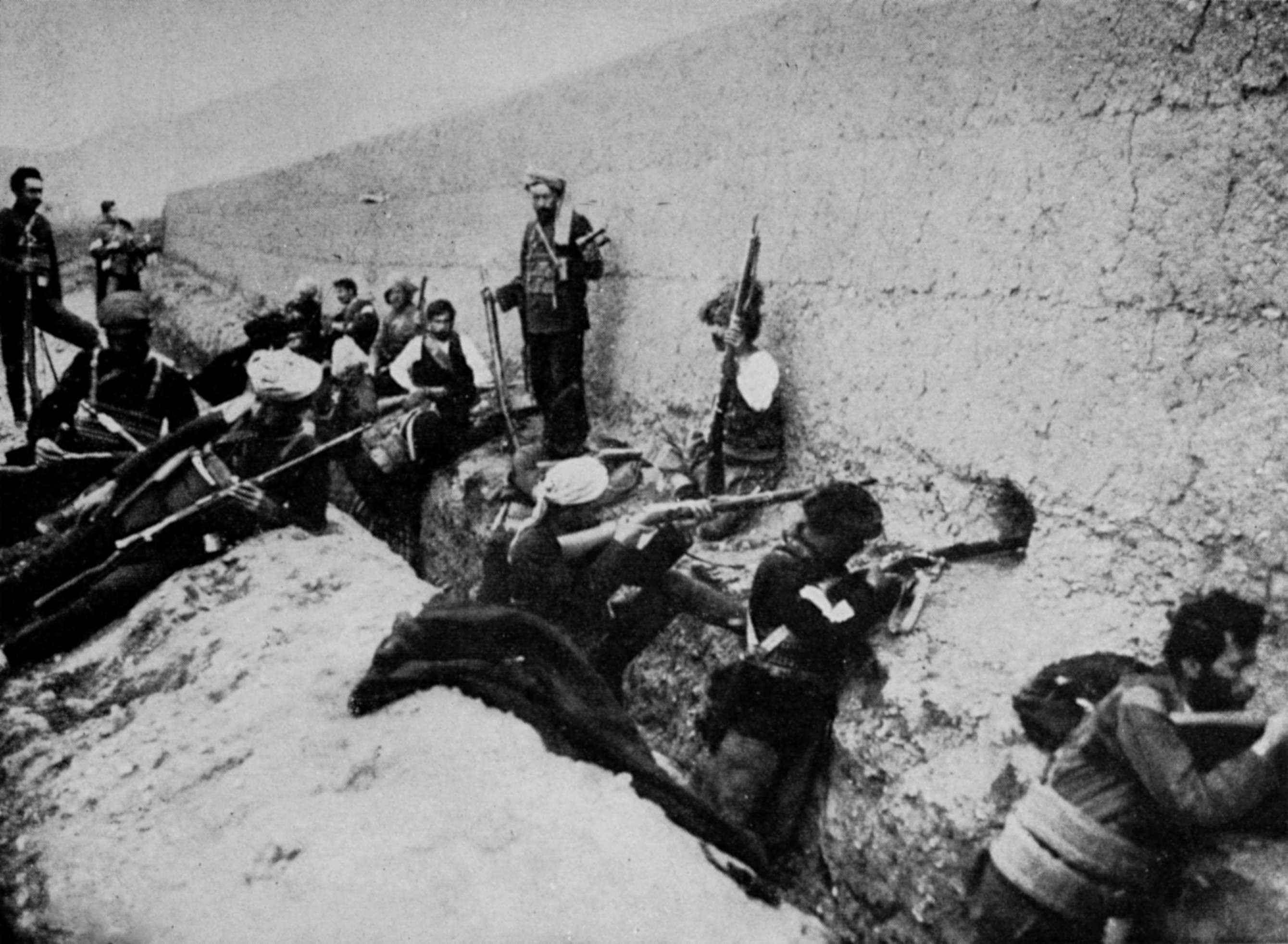
Armenian defenders in Van, 1916

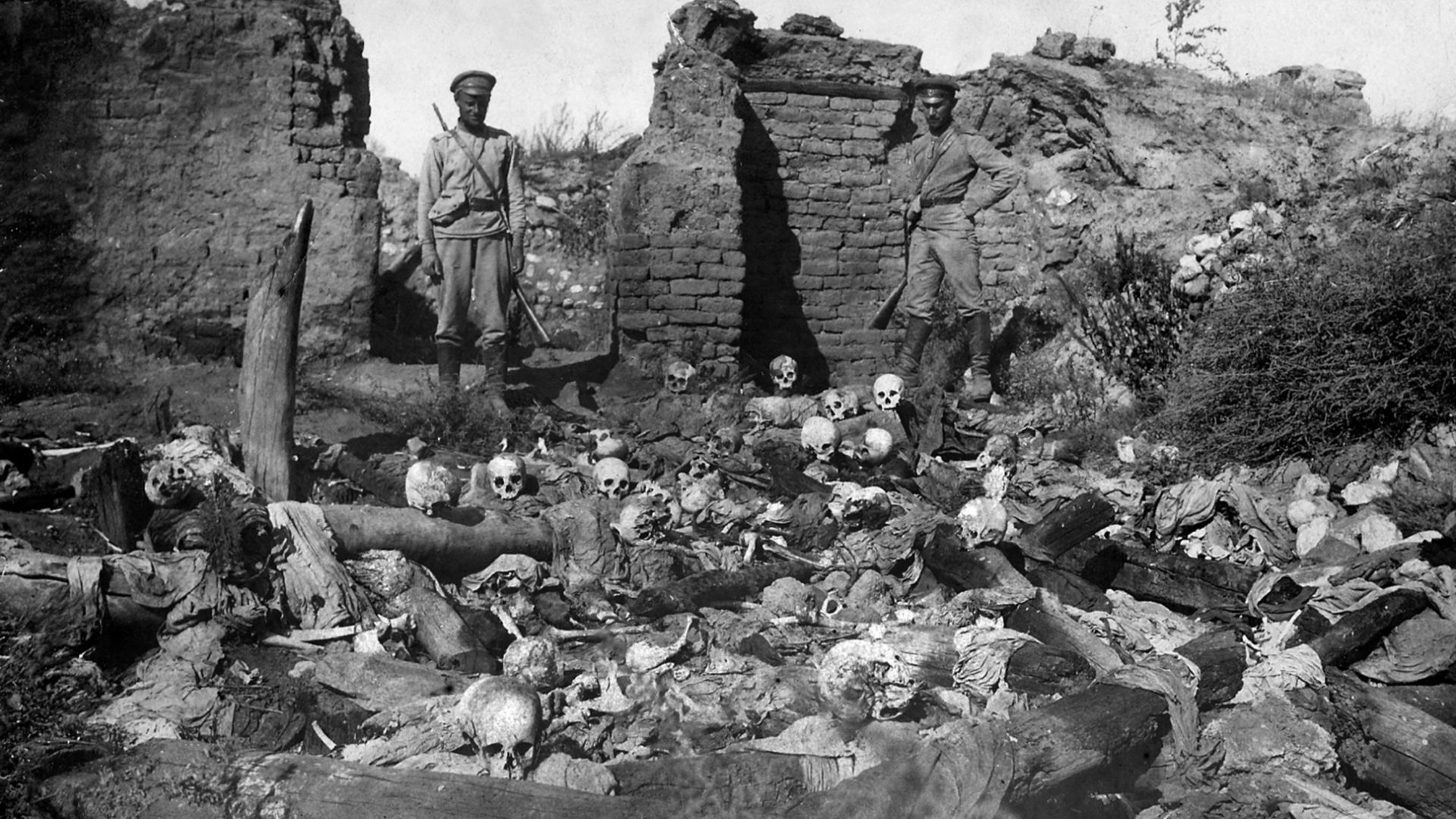
Russian soldiers pictured in the former Armenian village of Sheykhalan near Mush, 1915

Minister of War Enver Pasha took over command of the Ottoman armies for the invasion of Russian territory, and tried to encircle the Russian Caucasus Army at the Battle of Sarikamish, fought from December 1914 to January 1915. Unprepared for the harsh winter conditions, his forces were routed, losing more than 60,000 men. The retreating Ottoman army destroyed dozens of Ottoman Armenian villages in Bitlis vilayet, massacring their inhabitants. Enver publicly blamed his defeat on Armenians who he claimed had actively sided with the Russians, a theory that became a consensus among CUP leaders. Reports of local incidents such as weapons caches, severed telegraph lines, and occasional killings confirmed preexisting beliefs about Armenian treachery and fueled paranoia among CUP leaders that a coordinated Armenian conspiracy was plotting against the empire. Discounting contrary reports that most Armenians were loyal, the CUP leaders decided that the Armenians had to be eliminated to save the empire.

Massacres of Armenian men were occurring in the vicinity of Başkale in Van vilayet from December 1914. ARF leaders attempted to keep the situation calm, warning that even justifiable self-defense could lead to escalation of killing. The governor, Djevdet Bey, ordered the Armenians of Van to hand over their arms on 18 April 1915, creating a dilemma: If they obeyed, the Armenians expected to be killed, but if they refused, it would provide a pretext for massacres. Armenians fortified themselves in Van and repelled the Ottoman attack that began on 20 April. During the siege, Armenians in surrounding villages were massacred at Djevdet's orders. Russian forces captured Van on 18 May, finding 55,000 corpses in the province—about half its prewar Armenian population. Djevdet's forces proceeded to Bitlis and attacked Armenian and Assyrian/Syriac villages; the men were killed immediately, many women and children were kidnapped by local Kurds, and others marched away to be killed later. By the end of June, there were only a dozen Armenians in the vilayet.

The first deportations of Armenians were proposed by Djemal Pasha, the commander of the Fourth Army, in February 1915 and targeted Armenians in Cilicia (specifically Alexandretta, Dörtyol, Adana, Hadjin, Zeytun, and Sis) who were relocated to the area around Konya in central Anatolia. In late March or early April, the CUP Central Committee decided on the large-scale removal of Armenians from areas near the front lines. During the night of 23–24 April 1915 hundreds of Armenian political activists, intellectuals, and community leaders were rounded up in Constantinople and across the empire. This order from Talaat, intended to eliminate the Armenian leadership and anyone capable of organizing resistance, eventually resulted in the murder of most of those arrested. The same day, Talaat banned all Armenian political organizations and ordered that the Armenians who had previously been removed from Cilicia be deported again, from central Anatolia—where they would likely have survived—to the Syrian desert.

== Systematic deportations ==
=== Aims ===
We have been blamed for not making a distinction between guilty and innocent Armenians. [To do so] was impossible. Because of the nature of things, one who was still innocent today could be guilty tomorrow. The concern for the safety of Turkey simply had to silence all other concerns.

— Talaat Pasha in Berliner Tageblatt, 4 May 1916

During World War I, the CUP—whose central goal was to preserve the Ottoman Empire—came to identify Armenian civilians as an existential threat. CUP leaders held Armenians—including women and children—collectively guilty for betraying the empire, a belief that was crucial to deciding on genocide in early 1915. At the same time, the war provided an opportunity to enact what Talaat called the "definitive solution to the Armenian Question". The CUP wrongly believed that the Russian Empire sought to annex eastern Anatolia, and ordered the genocide in large part to prevent this eventuality. The genocide was intended to permanently eliminate any possibility that Armenians could achieve autonomy or independence in the empire's eastern provinces. Ottoman records show the government aimed to reduce Armenians to no more than five percent of the local population in the sources of deportation and ten percent in the destination areas. This goal could not be accomplished without mass murder.

The deportation of Armenians and resettlement of Muslims in their lands was part of a broader project intended to permanently restructure the demographics of Anatolia. Armenian homes, businesses, and land were preferentially allocated to Muslims from outside the empire, nomads, and the estimated 800,000 (largely Kurdish) Ottoman subjects displaced because of the war with Russia. Resettled Muslims were spread out (typically limited to 10 percent in any area) among larger Turkish populations so that they would lose their distinctive characteristics, such as non-Turkish languages or nomadism. These migrants were exposed to harsh conditions and, in some cases, violence or restriction from leaving their new villages. The ethnic cleansing of Anatolia—the Armenian genocide, Assyrian genocide, and expulsion of Greeks after World War I—paved the way for the formation of an ethno-national Turkish state. In September 1918, Talaat emphasized that regardless of losing the war, he had succeeded at "transforming Turkey to a nation-state in Anatolia".

Deportation amounted to a death sentence; the authorities planned for and intended the death of the deportees. Deportation was only carried out behind the front lines, where no active rebellion existed, and was only possible in the absence of widespread resistance. Armenians who lived in the war zone were instead killed in massacres. Although ostensibly undertaken for security reasons, the deportation and murder of Armenians did not grant the empire any military advantage and actually undermined the Ottoman war effort. The empire faced a dilemma between its goal of eliminating Armenians and its practical need for their labor; those Armenians retained for their skills, in particular for manufacturing in war industries, were indispensable to the logistics of the Ottoman Army. By late 1915, the CUP had extinguished Armenian existence from eastern Anatolia.

Map of the Armenian genocide in 1915

=== Administrative organization ===
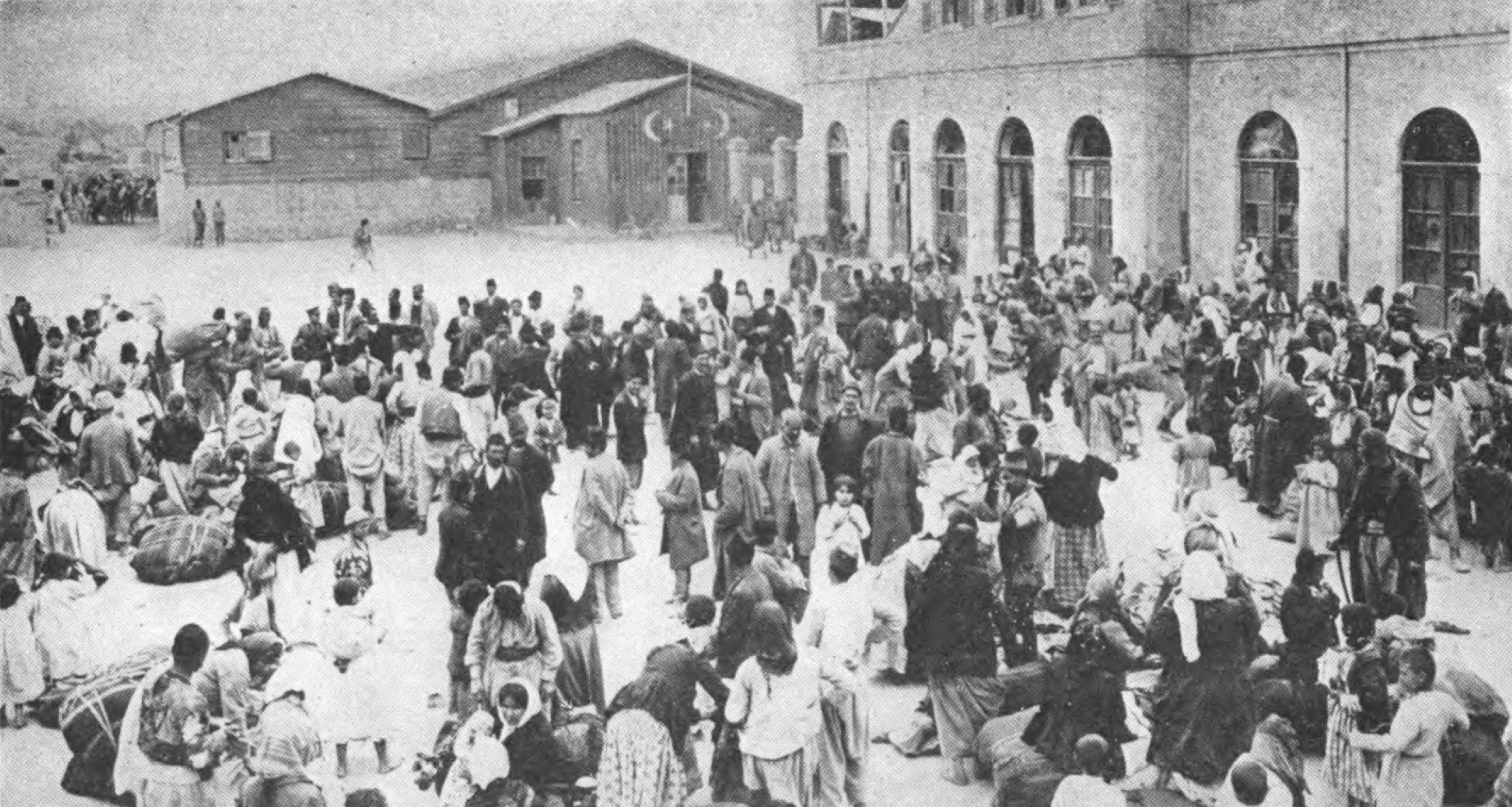
Armenians gathered in a city prior to deportation. They were murdered outside the city.

On 23 May 1915, Talaat ordered the deportation of all Armenians in Van, Bitlis, and Erzerum. To grant a cover of legality to the deportation, already well underway in the eastern provinces and Cilicia, the Council of Ministers approved the Temporary Law of Deportation, which allowed authorities to deport anyone deemed suspect. On 21 June, Talaat ordered the deportation of all Armenians throughout the empire, even Adrianople, 2,000 kilometers (1,200 mi) from the Russian front. Following the elimination of the Armenian population in eastern Anatolia, in August 1915, the Armenians of western Anatolia and European Turkey were targeted for deportation. Some areas with a very low Armenian population and some cities, including Constantinople, were partially spared.

Overall, national, regional, and local levels of governance cooperated with the CUP in the perpetration of genocide. The Directorate for the Settlement of Tribes and Immigrants (IAMM) coordinated the deportation and the resettlement of Muslim immigrants in the vacant houses and lands. The IAMM, under the control of Talaat's Ministry of the Interior, and the Special Organization, which took orders directly from the CUP Central Committee, all closely coordinated their activities. A dual-track system was used to communicate orders: those for the deportation of Armenians were communicated to the provincial governors through official channels, but orders of a criminal character, such as those calling for annihilation, were sent through party channels and destroyed upon receipt. Deportation convoys were mostly escorted by gendarmes or local militia. The killings near the front lines were carried out by the Special Organization, and those farther away also involved local militias, bandits, gendarmes, or Kurdish tribes depending on the area. Within the area controlled by the Third Army, which held eastern Anatolia, the army was only involved in genocidal atrocities in the vilayets of Van, Erzerum, and Bitlis.

Many perpetrators came from the Caucasus (Chechens and Circassians), who identified the Armenians with their Russian oppressors. Nomadic Kurds committed many atrocities during the genocide, but settled Kurds only rarely did so. Perpetrators had several motives, including ideology, revenge, desire for Armenian property, and careerism. To motivate perpetrators, state-appointed imams encouraged the killing of Armenians and killers were entitled to a third of Armenian movable property (another third went to local authorities and the last to the CUP). Embezzling beyond that was punished. Ottoman politicians and officials who opposed the genocide were dismissed or assassinated. The government decreed that any Muslim who harbored an Armenian against the will of the authorities would be executed.

=== Death marches ===
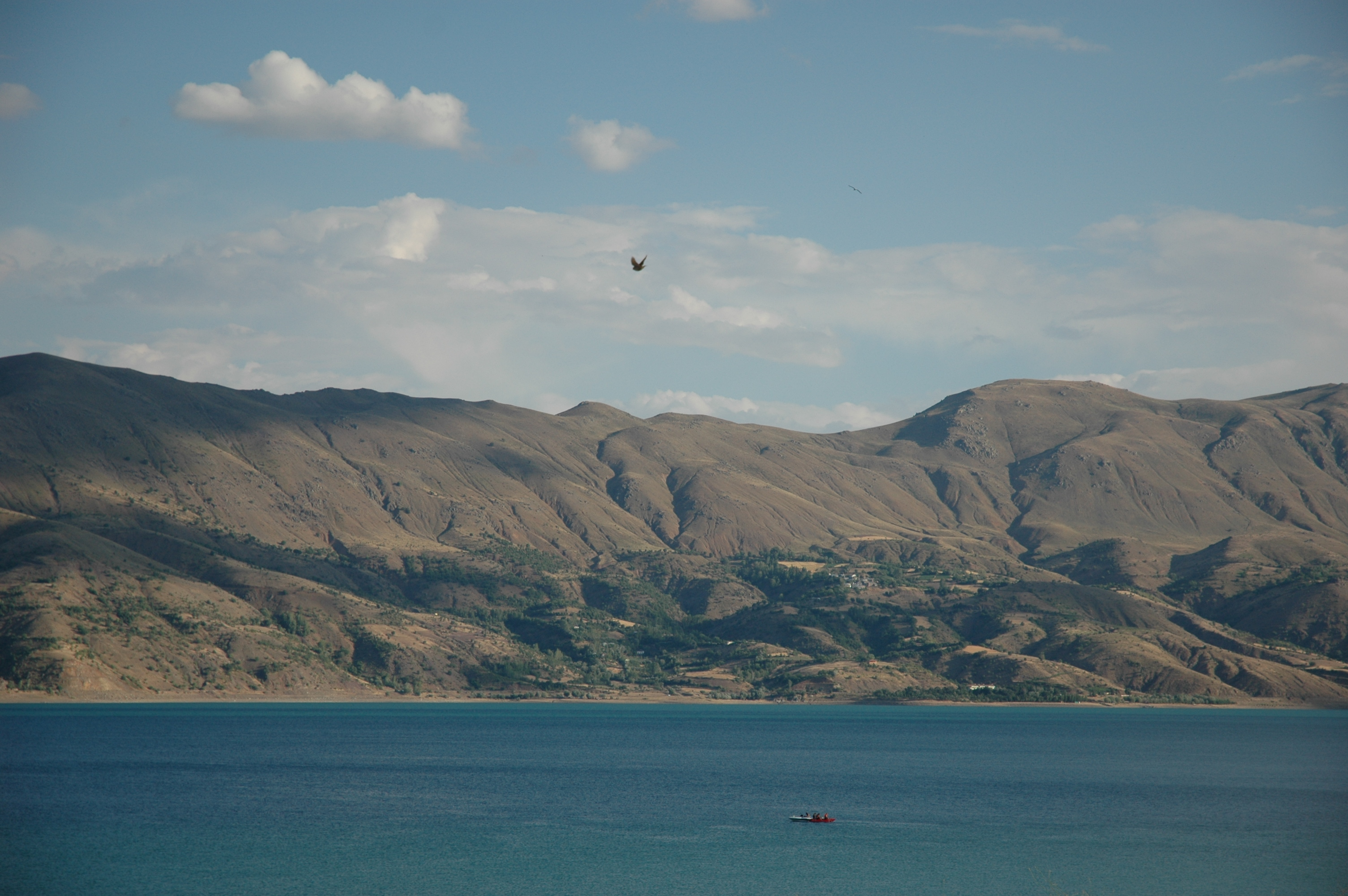
On 24 September 1915, United States consul Leslie Davis visited Lake Hazar and found hundreds of corpses in the water and in nearby gorges.

Although the majority of able-bodied Armenian men had been conscripted into the army, others deserted, paid the exemption tax, or fell outside the age range of conscription. Unlike the earlier massacres of Ottoman Armenians, in 1915 Armenians were not usually killed in their villages, to avoid destruction of property or unauthorized looting. Instead, the men were usually separated from the rest of the deportees during the first few days and executed. Few resisted, believing it would put their families in greater danger. Boys above the age of twelve (sometimes fifteen) were treated as adult men. Execution sites were chosen for proximity to major roads and for rugged terrain, lakes, wells, or cisterns to facilitate the concealment or disposal of corpses. The convoys would stop at a nearby transit camp, where the escorts would demand a ransom from the Armenians. Those unable to pay were murdered. Units of the Special Organization, often wearing gendarme uniforms, were stationed at the killing sites; escorting gendarmes often did not participate in killing.

At least 150,000 Armenians passed through Erzindjan from June 1915, where a series of transit camps were set up to control the flow of victims to the killing site at the nearby Kemah gorge. Thousands of Armenians were killed near Lake Hazar, pushed by paramilitaries off the cliffs. More than 500,000 Armenians passed through the Firincilar plain south of Malatya, one of the deadliest areas during the genocide. Arriving convoys, having passed through the plain to approach the Kahta highlands, would have found gorges already filled with corpses from previous convoys. Many others were held in tributary valleys of the Tigris, Euphrates, or Murat and systematically executed by the Special Organization. Armenian men were often drowned by being tied together back-to-back before being thrown in the water, a method that was not used on women.

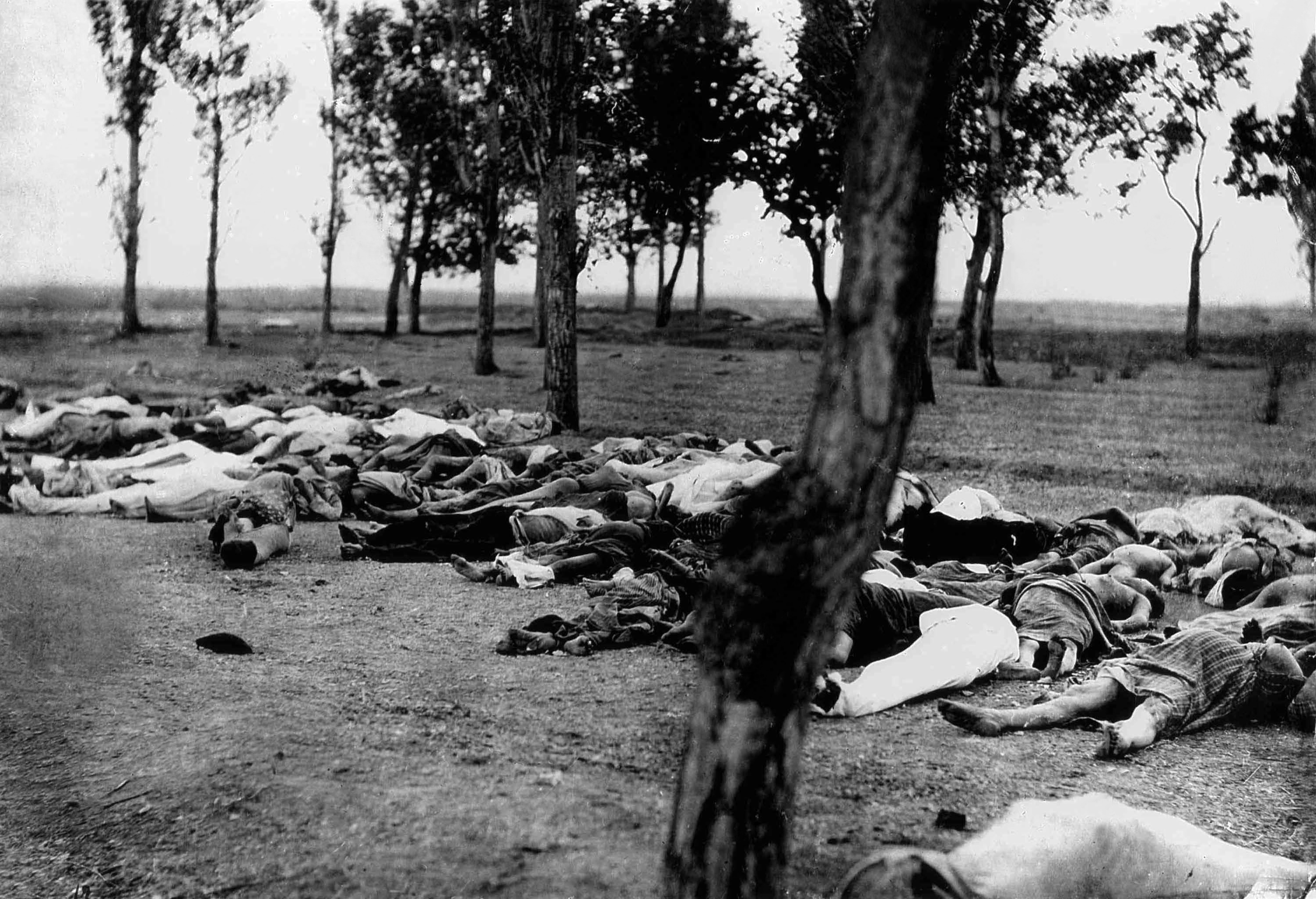
The corpses of Armenians beside a road, a common sight along deportation routes

Authorities viewed disposal of bodies through rivers as a cheap and efficient method, but it caused widespread pollution downstream. So many bodies floated down the Tigris and Euphrates that they sometimes blocked the rivers and needed to be cleared with explosives. Other rotting corpses became stuck to the riverbanks, and still others traveled as far as the Persian Gulf. The rivers remained polluted long after the massacres, causing epidemics downstream. Tens of thousands of Armenians died along the roads and their bodies were buried hastily or, more often, simply left beside the roads. The Ottoman government ordered the corpses to be cleared as soon as possible to prevent both photographic documentation and disease epidemics, but these orders were not uniformly followed.

Women and children, who made up the great majority of deportees, were usually not executed immediately, but subjected to hard marches through mountainous terrain without food and water. Those who could not keep up were left to die or shot. During 1915, some were forced to walk as far as 1,000 kilometers (620 mi) in the summer heat. Some deportees from western Anatolia were allowed to travel by rail. There was a distinction between the convoys from eastern Anatolia, which were eliminated almost in their entirety, and those from farther west, which made up most of those surviving to reach Syria. For example, around 99 percent of Armenians deported from Erzerum did not reach their destination.

=== Islamization ===
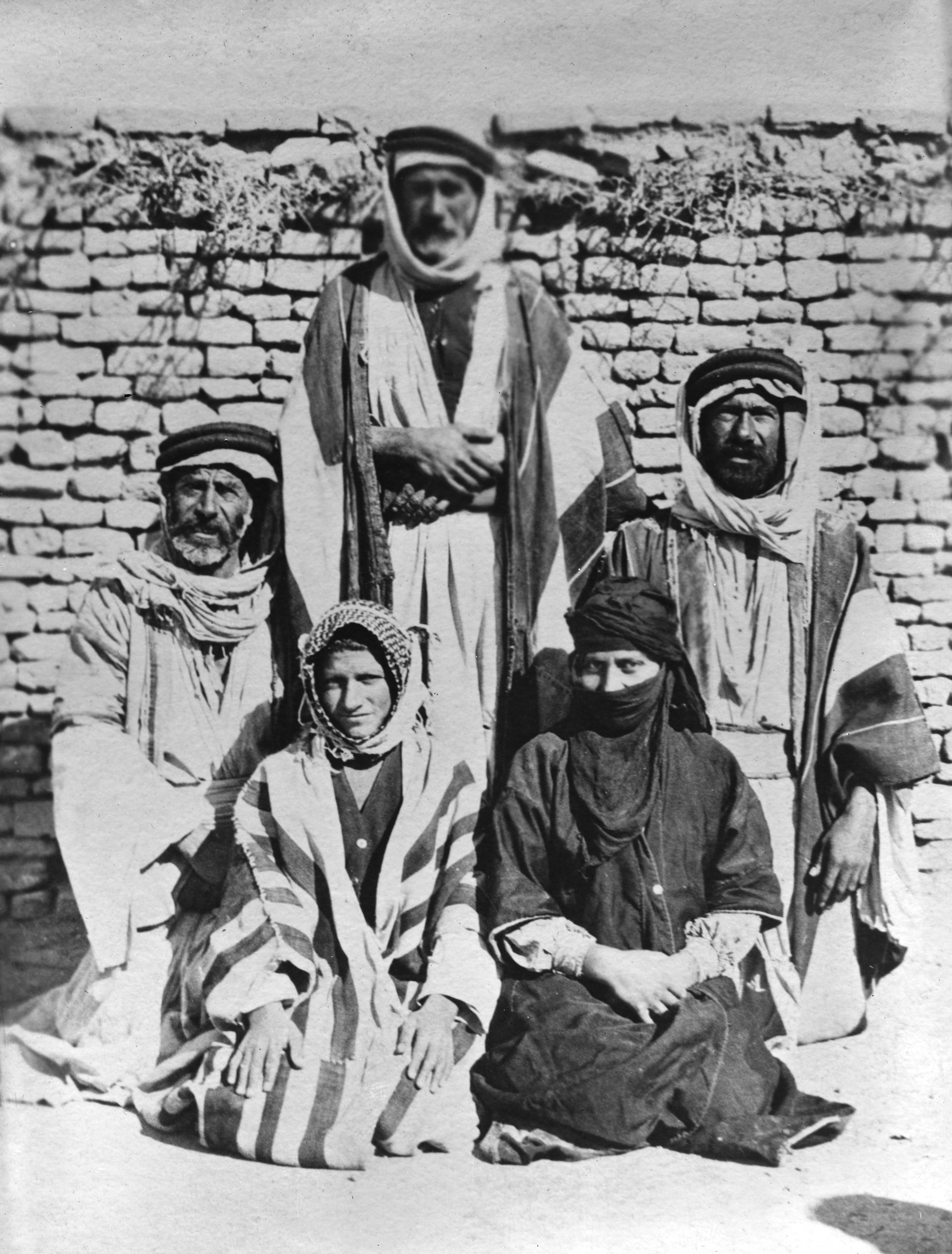
Islamized Armenians who were "rescued from Arabs" after the war

The Islamization of Armenians, carried out as a systematic state policy involving the bureaucracy, police, judiciary, and clergy, was a major structural component of the genocide. An estimated 100,000 to 200,000 Armenians were Islamized, and it is estimated that as many as two million Turkish citizens in the early 21st century may have at least one Armenian grandparent. Some Armenians were allowed to convert to Islam and evade deportation, but the regime insisted on their destruction wherever their numbers exceeded the five to ten percent threshold, or there was a risk of them being able to preserve their nationality and culture. Talaat Pasha personally authorized conversion of Armenians and carefully tracked the loyalty of converted Armenians until the end of the war. Although the first and most important step was conversion to Islam, the process also required the eradication of Armenian names, language, and culture, and for women, immediate marriage to a Muslim. Although Islamization was the most feasible opportunity for survival, it also transgressed Armenian moral and social norms.

The CUP allowed Armenian women to marry into Muslim households, as these women would lose their Armenian identity. Young women and girls were often appropriated as house servants or sex slaves. Some boys were abducted to work as forced laborers for Muslim individuals. Some children were forcibly seized, while others were sold or given up by their parents to save their lives. Special state-run orphanages were also set up with strict procedures intending to deprive their charges of an Armenian identity. Most Armenian children who survived the genocide endured exploitation, hard labor without pay, forced conversion to Islam, and physical and sexual abuse. Armenian women captured during the journey ended up in Turkish or Kurdish households; those who were Islamized during the second phase of the genocide found themselves in an Arab or Bedouin environment.

The rape, sexual abuse, and prostitution of Armenian women were all very common. Although Armenian women tried to avoid sexual violence, suicide was often the only alternative. Deportees were displayed naked in Damascus and sold as sex slaves in some areas, constituting an important source of income for accompanying gendarmes. Some were sold in Arabian slave markets to Muslim Hajj pilgrims and ended up as far away as Tunisia or Algeria.

=== Confiscation of property ===
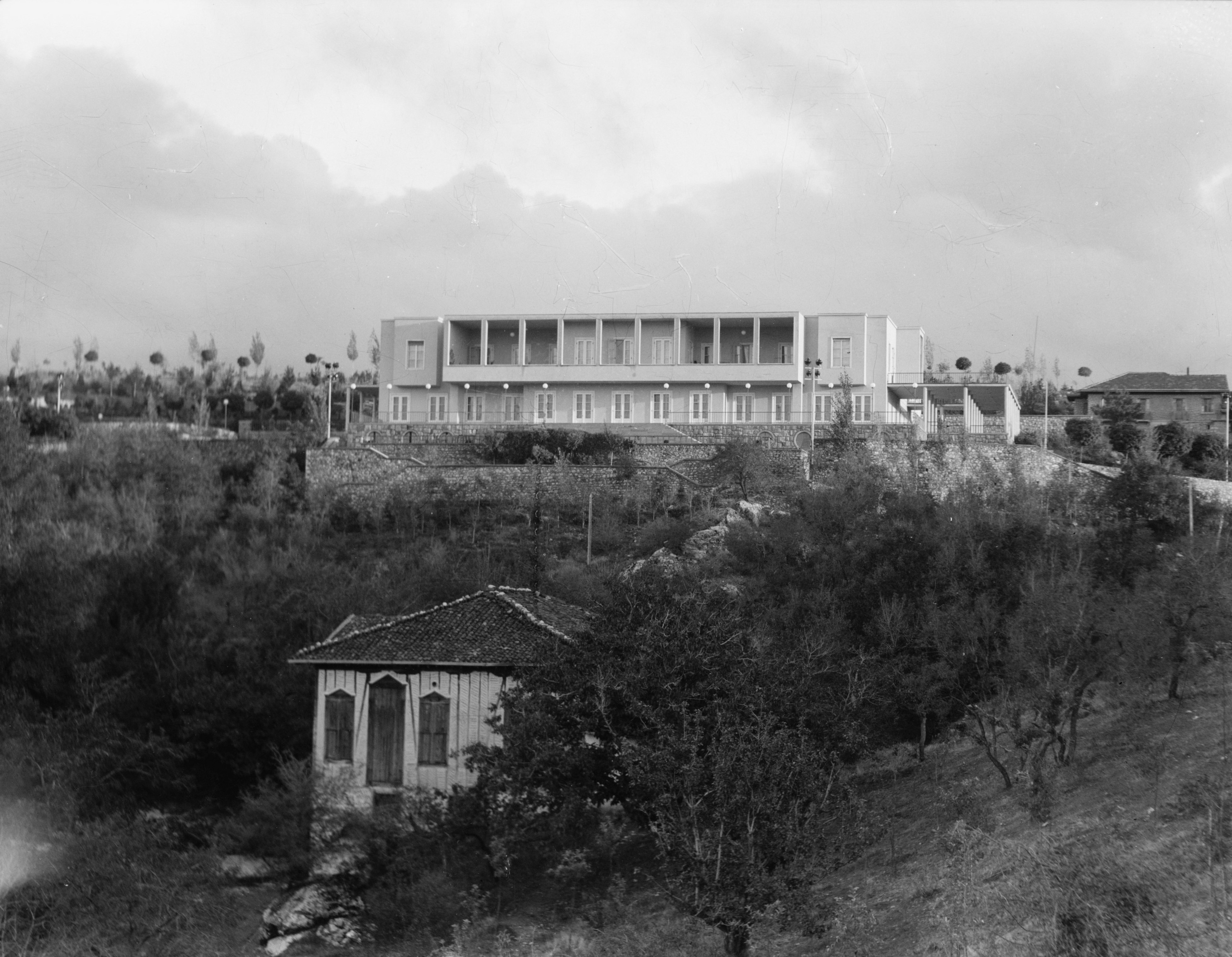
Çankaya Mansion, the official residence of the president of Turkey, was confiscated from Ohannes Kasabian, an Armenian businessman, in 1915.

A secondary motivation for genocide was the destruction of the Armenian bourgeoisie to make room for a Turkish and Muslim middle class and build a statist national economy controlled by Muslim Turks. The campaign to Turkify the economy began in June 1914 with a law that obliged many non-Muslim merchants to hire Muslims. Following the deportations, the businesses of the victims were taken over by Muslims who were often incompetent, leading to economic difficulties. The genocide had catastrophic effects on the Ottoman economy; Muslims were disadvantaged by the deportation of skilled professionals and entire districts fell into famine following their farmers' deportation. The Ottoman and Turkish governments passed a series of Abandoned Properties Laws to manage and redistribute property confiscated from Armenians. Although the laws maintained that the state was simply administering the properties on behalf of the absent Armenians, there was no provision to return them to the owners—it was presumed that they had ceased to exist.

Historians Taner Akçam and Ümit Kurt argue that "[t]he Republic of Turkey and its legal system were built, in a sense, on the seizure of Armenian cultural, social, and economic wealth, and on the removal of the Armenian presence." The proceeds from the sale of confiscated property was often used to fund the deportation of Armenians and resettlement of Muslims, as well as for army, militia, and other government spending. Ultimately this formed much of the basis of the industry and economy of the post-1923 republic, endowing it with capital. The dispossession and exile of Armenian competitors enabled many lower-class Turks (i.e. peasantry, soldiers, and laborers) to rise to the middle class. Confiscation of Armenian assets continued into the second half of the twentieth century, and in 2006 the National Security Council ruled that property records from 1915 must be kept closed to protect national security. Outside Istanbul, the traces of Armenian existence in Turkey, including churches and monasteries, libraries, khachkars, and animal and place names, have been systematically erased, beginning during the war and continuing for decades afterward.

== Destination ==
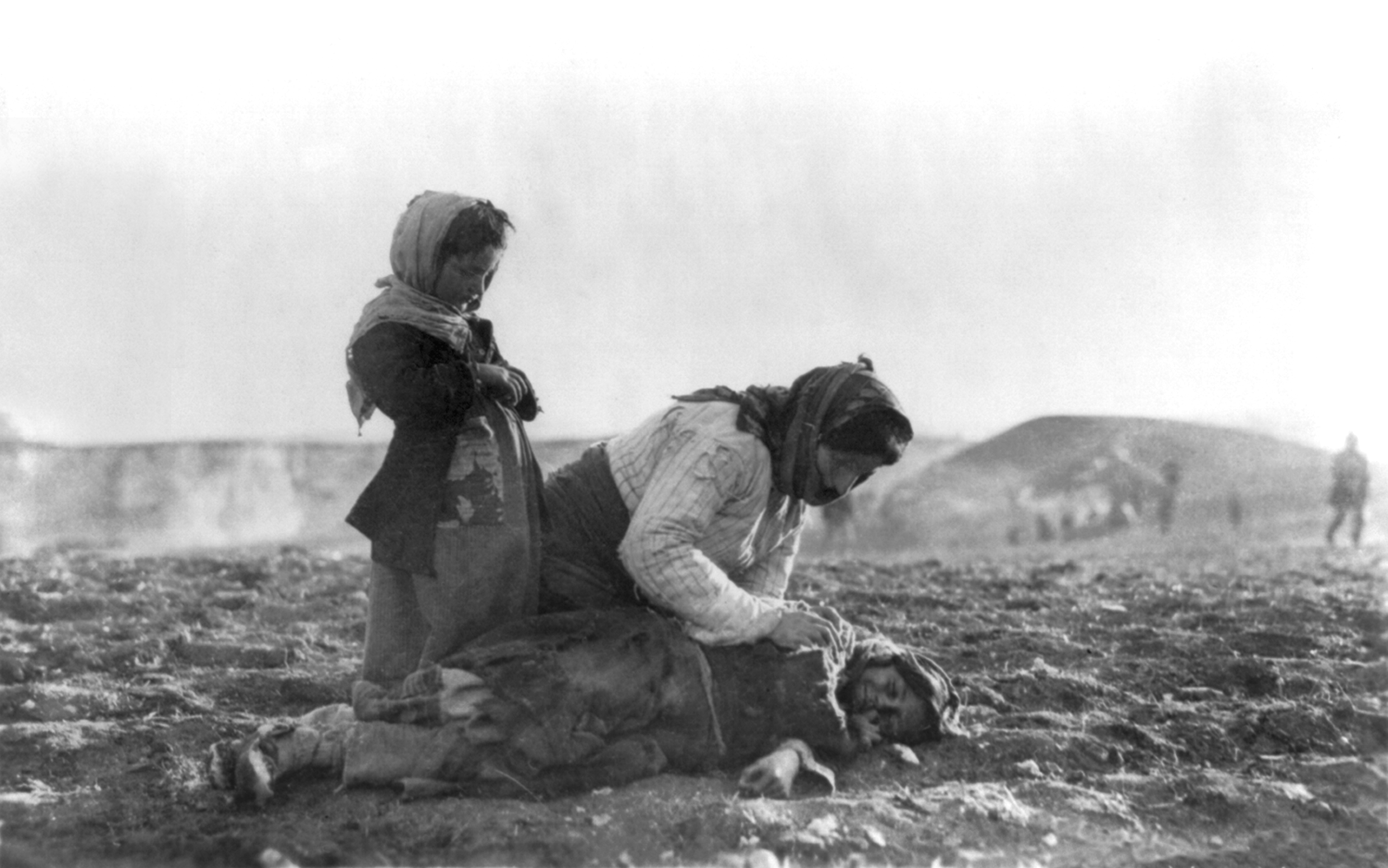
An Armenian woman kneeling beside a dead child in a field outside Aleppo

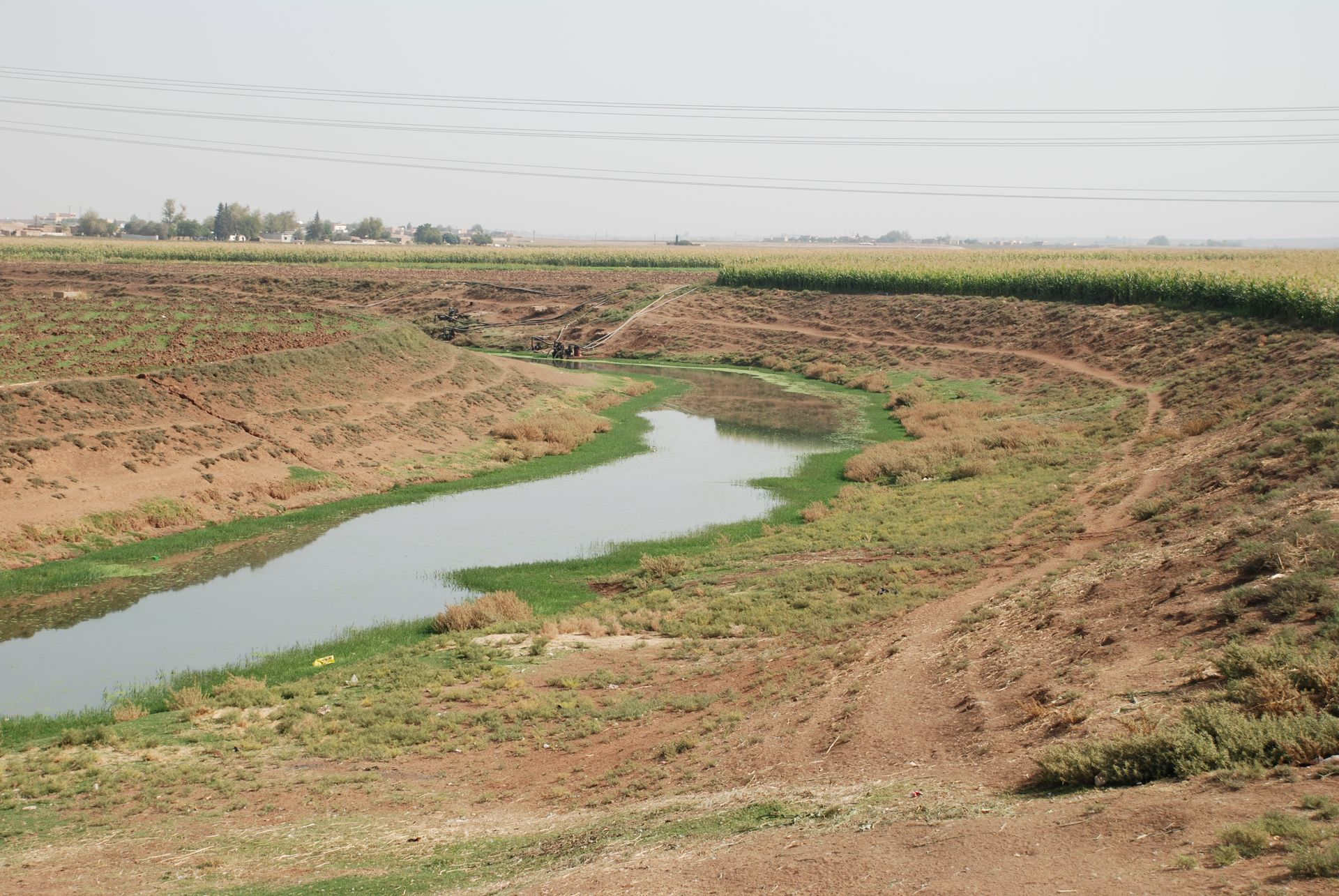
Khabur near Ras al-Ayn

The first arrivals in mid-1915 were accommodated in Aleppo. From mid-November, the convoys were denied access to the city and redirected along the Baghdad Railway or the Euphrates towards Mosul. The first transit camp was established at Sibil, east of Aleppo; one convoy would arrive each day while another would depart for Meskene or Deir ez-Zor. Dozens of concentration camps were set up in Syria and Upper Mesopotamia. By October 1915, some 870,000 deportees had reached Syria and Upper Mesopotamia. Most were repeatedly transferred between camps, being held in each camp for a few weeks, until there were very few survivors. This strategy physically weakened the Armenians and spread disease, so much that some camps were shut down in late 1915 due to the threat of disease spreading to the Ottoman military. In late 1915, the camps around Aleppo were liquidated and the survivors were forced to march to Ras al-Ayn; the camps around Ras al-Ayn were closed in early 1916 and the survivors sent to Deir ez-Zor.

In general, Armenians were denied food and water during and after their forced march to the Syrian desert; many died of starvation, exhaustion, or disease, especially dysentery, typhus, and pneumonia. Some local officials gave Armenians food; others took bribes to provide food and water. Aid organizations were officially barred from providing food to the deportees, although some circumvented these prohibitions. Survivors testified that some Armenians refused aid as they believed it would only prolong their suffering. The guards raped female prisoners and also allowed Bedouins to raid the camps at night for looting and rape; some women were forced into marriage. Thousands of Armenian children were sold to childless Turks, Arabs, and Jews, who would come to the camps to buy them from their parents. In the western Levant, governed by the Ottoman Fourth Army under Djemal Pasha, there were no concentration camps or large-scale massacres, rather Armenians were resettled and recruited to work for the war effort. They had to convert to Islam or face deportation to another area.

The ability of the Armenians to adapt and survive was greater than the perpetrators expected. A loosely organized, Armenian-led resistance network based in Aleppo succeeded in helping many deportees, saving Armenian lives. At the beginning of 1916 some 500,000 deportees were alive in Syria and Mesopotamia. Afraid that surviving Armenians might return home after the war, Talaat Pasha ordered a second wave of massacres in February 1916. Another wave of deportations targeted Armenians remaining in Anatolia. More than 200,000 Armenians were killed between March and October 1916, often in remote areas near Deir ez-Zor and on parts of the Khabur valley, where their bodies would not create a public health hazard. The massacres killed most of the Armenians who had survived the camp system.

== International reaction ==
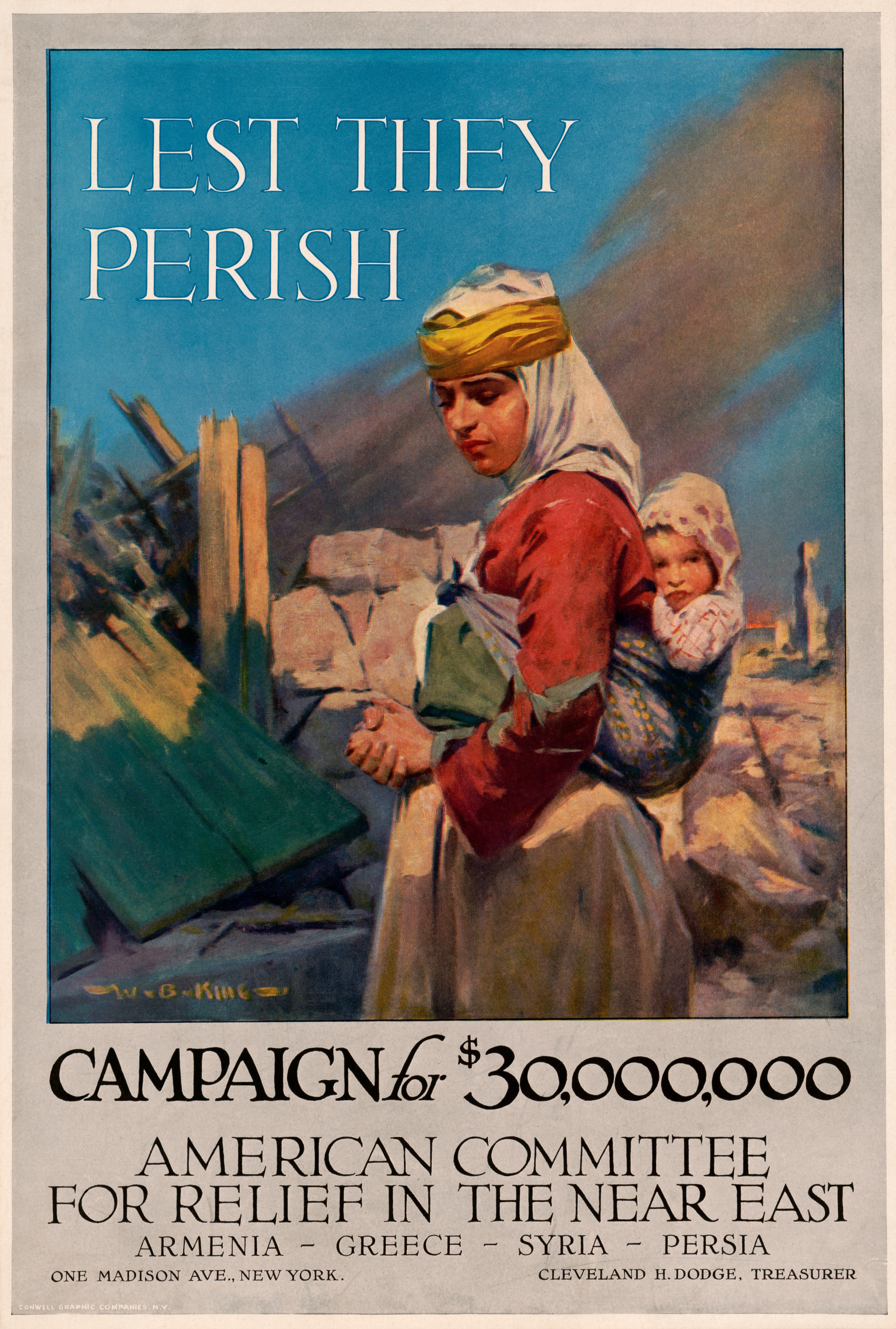
Fundraising poster for Near East Relief

The Ottoman Empire tried to prevent journalists and photographers from documenting the atrocities, threatening them with arrest. Nevertheless, substantiated reports of mass killings were widely covered in Western newspapers. On 24 May 1915, the Triple Entente (Russia, Britain, and France) formally condemned the Ottoman Empire for "crimes against humanity and civilization", and threatened to hold the perpetrators accountable. Witness testimony was published in books such as The Treatment of Armenians in the Ottoman Empire (1916) and Ambassador Morgenthau's Story (1918), raising public awareness of the genocide.

The German Empire was a military ally of the Ottoman Empire during World War I. German diplomats approved limited removals of Armenians in early 1915, and took no action against the genocide, which has been a source of controversy.

Relief efforts were organized in dozens of countries to raise money for Armenian survivors. By 1925, people in 49 countries were organizing "Golden Rule Sundays" during which they consumed the diet of Armenian refugees, to raise money for humanitarian efforts. Between 1915 and 1930, Near East Relief raised $110 million ($2.1 billion adjusted for inflation) for refugees from the Ottoman Empire.

== End of World War I ==
Percent of prewar Armenian population unaccounted for in 1917 based on Talaat Pasha's record. Black indicates that 100 percent of Armenians have disappeared. Resettlement zone is displayed in red.

Intentional, state-sponsored killing of Armenians mostly ceased by the end of January 1917, although sporadic massacres and starvation continued. Both contemporaries and later historians have estimated that around 1 million Armenians died during the genocide, with figures ranging from 600,000 to 1.5 million deaths. Between 800,000 and 1.2 million Armenians were deported, and contemporaries estimated that by late 1916 only 200,000 were still alive. As the British Army advanced in 1917 and 1918 northwards through the Levant, they liberated around 100,000 to 150,000 Armenians working for the Ottoman military under abysmal conditions, not including those held by Arab tribes.

As a result of the Bolshevik Revolution and the subsequent separate peace with the Central Powers, the Russian army withdrew and Ottoman forces advanced into eastern Anatolia. The First Republic of Armenia was proclaimed in May 1918, at which time 50 percent of its population were refugees and 60 percent of its territory was under Ottoman occupation. Ottoman troops withdrew from parts of Armenia following the October 1918 Armistice of Mudros. From 1918 to 1920, Armenian militants committed revenge killings of thousands of Muslims, which have been cited as a retroactive excuse for genocide. In 1918, at least 200,000 people in Armenia, mostly refugees, died from starvation or disease, in part due to a Turkish blockade of food supplies and the deliberate destruction of crops in eastern Armenia by Turkish troops, both before and after the armistice.

Armenians organized a coordinated effort known as vorpahavak (lit. 'the gathering of orphans') that reclaimed thousands of kidnapped and Islamized Armenian women and children. Armenian leaders abandoned traditional patrilineality to classify children born to Armenian women and their Muslim captors as Armenian. An orphanage in Alexandropol held 25,000 orphans, the largest number in the world. In 1920, the Armenian Patriarchate of Constantinople reported it was caring for 100,000 orphans, estimating that another 100,000 remained captive.

=== Trials ===
Following the armistice, Allied governments championed the prosecution of Armenian genocide perpetrators. Grand Vizier Damat Ferid Pasha publicly recognized that 800,000 Ottoman citizens of Armenian origin had died as a result of state policy and stated that "humanity, civilizations are shuddering, and forever will shudder, in face of this tragedy". The postwar Ottoman government held the Ottoman Special Military Tribunal, by which it sought to pin the Armenian genocide onto the CUP leadership while exonerating the Ottoman Empire as a whole, therefore avoiding partition by the Allies. The court ruled that "the crime of mass murder" of Armenians was "organized and carried out by the top leaders of CUP". Eighteen perpetrators (including Talaat, Enver, and Djemal) were sentenced to death, of whom only three were ultimately executed as the remainder had fled and were tried in absentia. The 1920 Treaty of Sèvres, which awarded Armenia a large area in eastern Anatolia, eliminated the Ottoman government's purpose for holding the trials. Prosecution was hampered by a widespread belief among Turkish Muslims that the actions against the Armenians were not punishable crimes. Increasingly, the genocide was considered necessary and justified to establish a Turkish nation-state.

On 15 March 1921, Talaat was assassinated in Berlin as part of a covert operation of the ARF to kill the perpetrators of the Armenian genocide. The trial of his admitted killer, Soghomon Tehlirian, focused on Talaat's responsibility for genocide. Tehlirian was acquitted by a German jury.

=== Turkish War of Independence ===
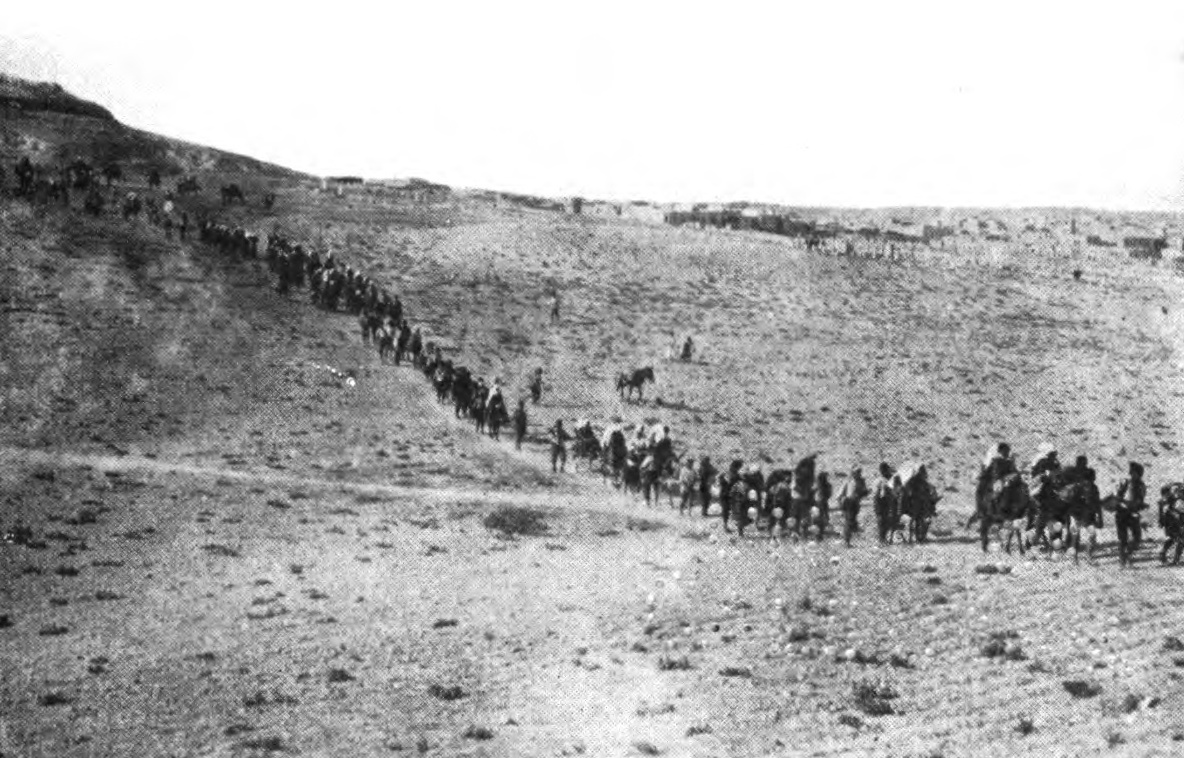
Children evacuated from Harput by Near East Relief in 1922 or 1923

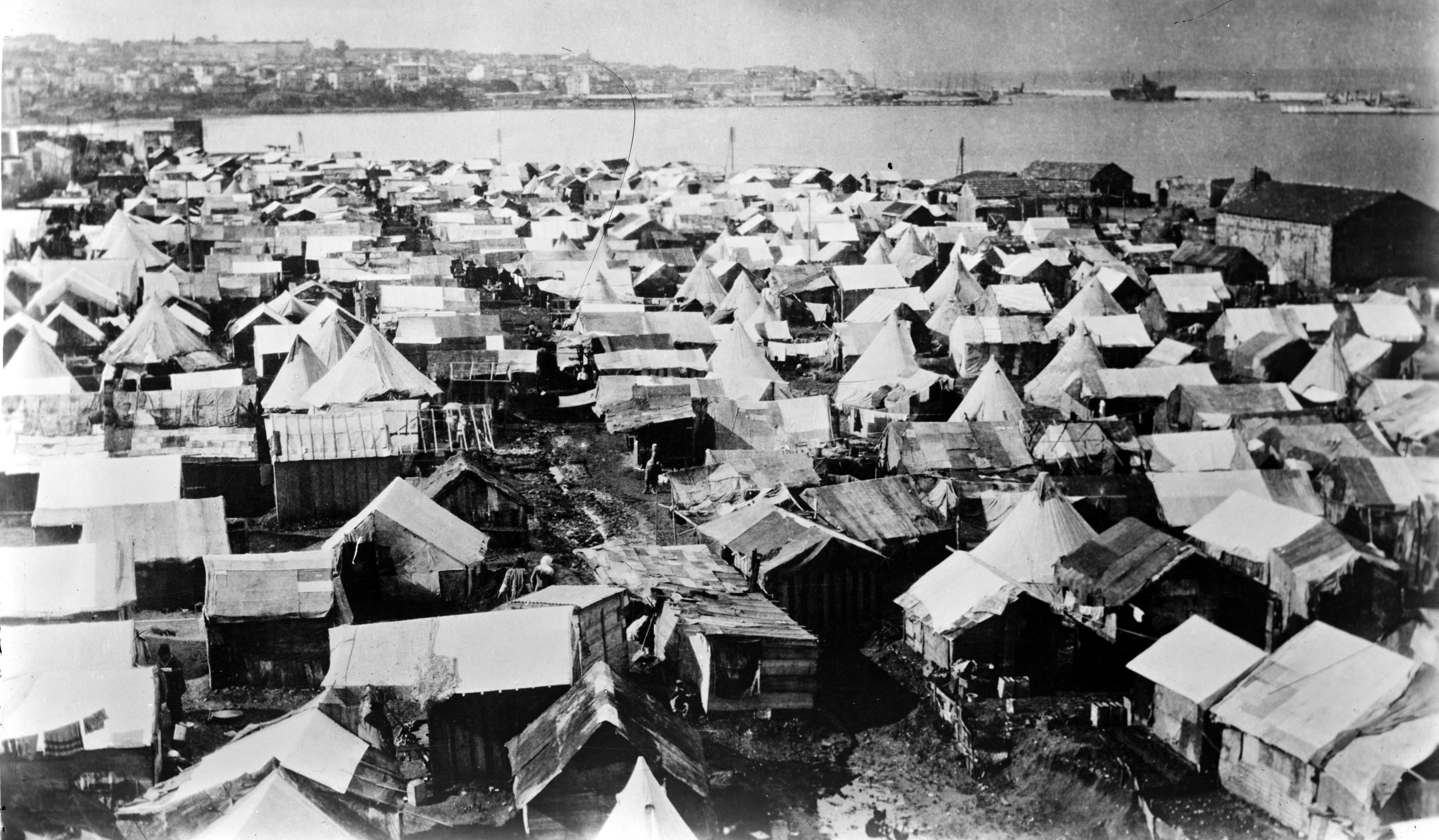
Refugee camp in Beirut, early 1920s

The CUP regrouped as the Turkish nationalist movement to fight the Turkish War of Independence, relying on the support of perpetrators of the genocide and those who had profited from it. This movement saw the return of Armenian survivors as a mortal threat to its nationalist ambitions and the interests of its supporters. The return of survivors was therefore impossible in most of Anatolia and thousands of Armenians who tried were murdered. Historian Raymond Kévorkian states that the war of independence was "intended to complete the genocide by finally eradicating Armenian, Greek, and Syriac survivors". In 1920 Kâzım Karabekir, a Turkish general, invaded Armenia with orders "to eliminate Armenia physically and politically". Nearly 100,000 Armenians were massacred in Transcaucasia by the Turkish army and another 100,000 fled from Cilicia during the French withdrawal. According to Kévorkian, only the Soviet occupation of Armenia prevented another genocide.

The victorious nationalists subsequently declared the Republic of Turkey in 1923. CUP war criminals were granted immunity and later that year, the Treaty of Lausanne established Turkey's current borders and provided for the Greek population's expulsion. Its protection provisions for non-Muslim minorities had no enforcement mechanism and were disregarded in practice.

Armenian survivors were left mainly in three locations. About 295,000 Armenians had fled to Russian-controlled territory during the genocide and ended up mostly in Soviet Armenia. An estimated 200,000 Armenian refugees settled in the Middle East, forming a new wave of the Armenian diaspora. In the Republic of Turkey, about 100,000 Armenians lived in Constantinople and another 200,000 lived in the provinces, largely women and children who had been forcibly converted. Though Armenians in Constantinople faced discrimination, they were allowed to maintain their cultural identity, unlike those elsewhere in Turkey who continued to face forced Islamization and kidnapping of girls after 1923. Between 1922 and 1929, the Turkish authorities eliminated surviving Armenians from southern Turkey, expelling thousands to French-mandate Syria.

== Legacy ==
According to historian Margaret Lavinia Anderson, the Armenian genocide reached an "iconic status" as "the apex of horrors conceivable" before World War II. It was described by contemporaries as "the murder of a nation", "race extermination", "the greatest crime of the ages", and "the blackest page in modern history". According to historian Stefan Ihrig, in Germany, the Nazis viewed post-1923 Turkey as a post-genocidal paradise and, "incorporated the Armenian genocide, its 'lessons', tactics, and 'benefits', into their own worldview".

=== Turkey ===
In the 1920s, Kurds and Alevis replaced Armenians as the perceived internal enemy of the Turkish state. Militarism, weak rule of law, lack of minority rights, and especially the belief that Turkey is constantly under threat—thus justifying state violence—are among the main legacies of the genocide in Turkey. In postwar Turkey, the perpetrators of the genocide were hailed as martyrs of the national cause. Turkey's official denial of the Armenian genocide continues to rely on the CUP's justification of its actions. The Turkish government maintains that the mass deportation of Armenians was a legitimate action to combat an existential threat to the empire, but that there was no intention to exterminate the Armenian people. The government's position is supported by the majority of Turkish citizens. Many Kurds, who themselves have suffered political repression in Turkey, have recognized and condemned the genocide.

The Turkish state perceives open discussion of the genocide as a threat to national security because of its connection with the foundation of the republic, and strictly censored it for decades. In 2002, after the AK Party came to power, censorship was relaxed to a certain extent, though the issue was raised following the 2007 assassination of Hrant Dink, a Turkish-Armenian journalist known for his advocacy of reconciliation. Although the AK Party softened the state denial rhetoric, describing Armenians as part of the Ottoman Empire's war losses, repression and censorship once again increased during the 2010s. Turkey's century-long effort to prevent any recognition or mention of the genocide in foreign countries has included millions of dollars in lobbying, as well as intimidation and threats.

=== Armenia and Azerbaijan ===
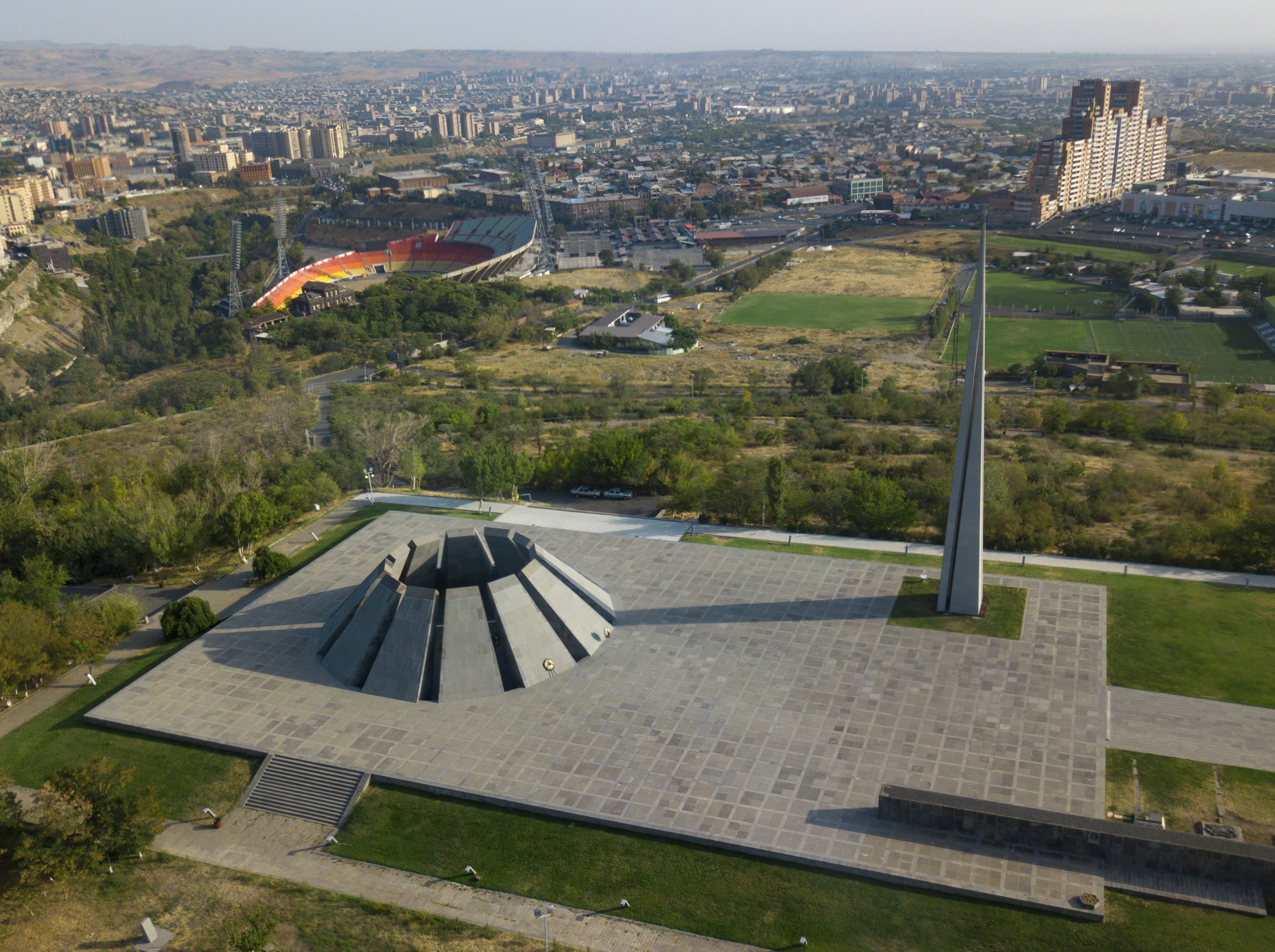
Aerial view of the Armenian Genocide memorial complex on a hill above Yerevan

Armenian Genocide Remembrance Day is commemorated on 24 April each year in Armenia and abroad, the anniversary of the deportation of Armenian intellectuals. On 24 April 1965, 100,000 Armenians protested in Yerevan, and diaspora Armenians demonstrated across the world in favor of recognition of the genocide and annexing land from Turkey. A memorial was completed two years later, at Tsitsernakaberd above Yerevan.

Since 1988, Armenians and Turkic Azeris have been involved in a conflict over Nagorno-Karabakh, an Armenian enclave internationally recognized as part of Azerbaijan. Initially involving peaceful demonstrations by Armenians, the conflict turned violent and has featured massacres by both sides, resulting in the displacement of more than half a million people. During the conflict, the Azerbaijani and Armenian governments have regularly accused each other of plotting genocide. Azerbaijan has also joined the Turkish effort to deny the Armenian genocide.

=== International recognition ===
National legislatures that have passed resolutions recognizing the Armenian genocide States that explicitly deny the Armenian genocide

In response to continuing denial by the Turkish state, many Armenian diaspora activists have lobbied for international formal recognition of the Armenian genocide, an effort that has become a central concern of the Armenian diaspora. Since the 1970s, many countries have avoided recognition in order to preserve diplomatic relations with Turkey. As of 2026, 35 UN member states have formally recognised the genocide, along with the Holy See and the European Parliament.

=== Cultural depictions ===
After meeting Armenian survivors in the Middle East, Austrian–Jewish writer Franz Werfel wrote The Forty Days of Musa Dagh, a fictionalized retelling of the successful Armenian uprising in Musa Dagh, as a warning of the dangers of Nazism. According to Ihrig, the book, released in 1933, is among the most important works of twentieth-century literature to address genocide and "is still considered essential reading for Armenians worldwide". The genocide became a central theme in English-language Armenian-American literature. The first film about the Armenian genocide, Ravished Armenia, was released in 1919 as a fundraiser for Near East Relief, based on the survival story of Aurora Mardiganian, who played herself. Since then more films about the genocide have been made, although it took several decades for any of them to reach a mass-market audience. The abstract expressionist paintings of Arshile Gorky were influenced by his experience of the genocide. More than 200 memorials have been erected in 32 countries to commemorate the event.

=== Archives and historiography ===
The genocide is extensively documented in the archives of Germany, Austria, the United States, Russia, France, and the United Kingdom, as well as the Ottoman archives, despite systematic purges of incriminating documents by Turkey. There are also thousands of eyewitness accounts from Western missionaries and Armenian survivors. Polish-Jewish lawyer Raphael Lemkin, who coined the term genocide in 1944, became interested in war crimes after reading about the 1921 trial of Soghomon Tehlirian for the assassination of Talaat Pasha. Lemkin recognized the fate of the Armenians as one of the most significant genocides in the twentieth century. Almost all historians and scholars outside Turkey, and an increasing number of Turkish scholars, recognize the destruction of Armenians in the Ottoman Empire as genocide.

== See also ==
- Bibliography of the Armenian genocide
- Mustafa Kemal Atatürk's statements on the Armenian genocide
- Outline of the Armenian genocide
