= Casualties of the Armenian genocide =

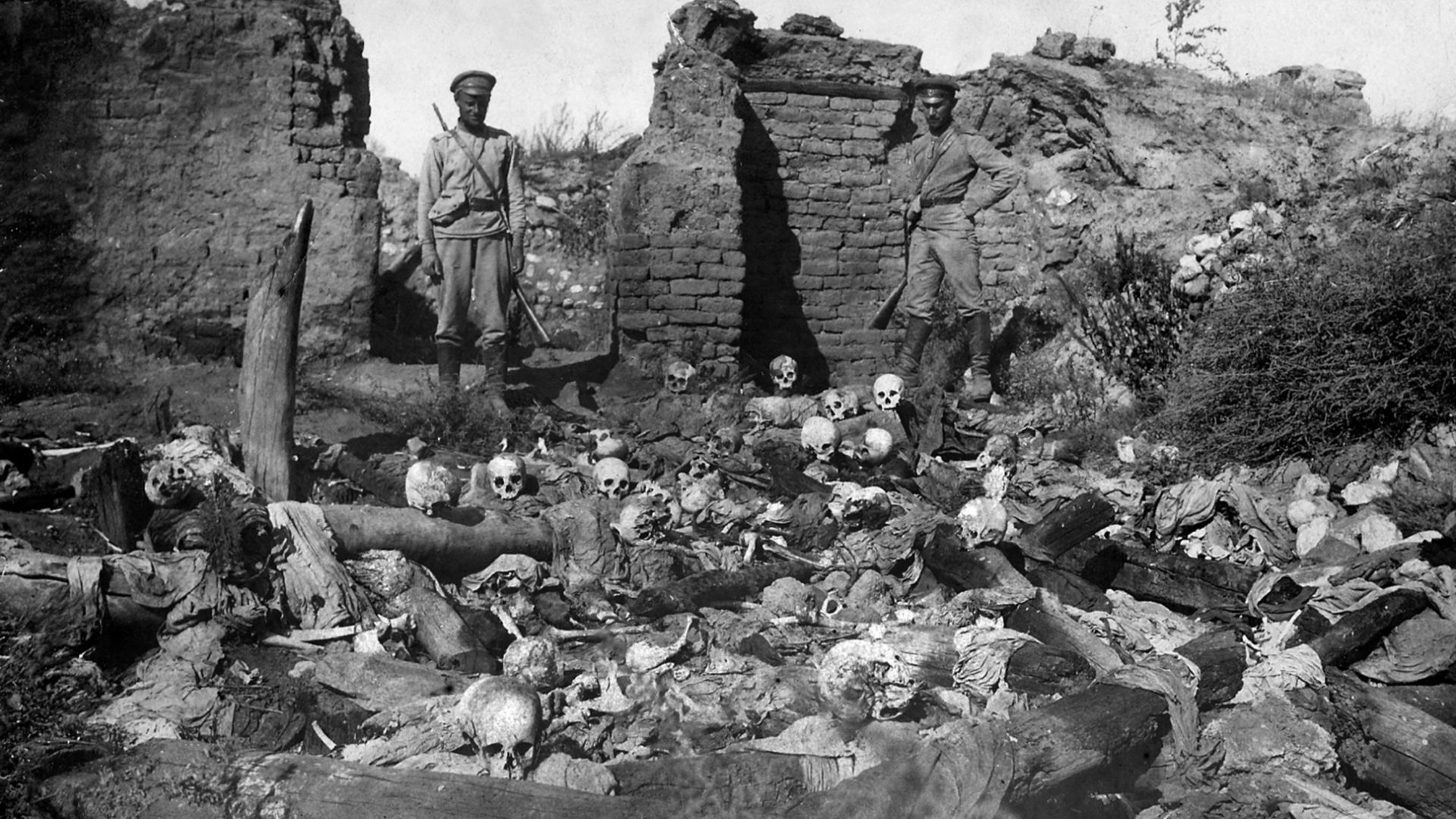
Russian soldiers in the former Armenian village of Sheykhalan, 1915

The number of deaths of Armenians in the Ottoman Empire occurred between 1914 and 1923, the period of the Armenian genocide. Most estimates of Armenian deaths between 1915 and 1918 range from 1.3 million to 1.5 million, which corresponds to roughly one-third to over half of the Armenian population at the time.

== Prewar estimates ==
There is no agreement among historians how many Armenians lived in the empire prior to the genocide. The official census reported 1.1 million Armenians living in the empire in 1912. This is considered an underestimate, and the Armenian Patriarchate of Constantinople reported 2.1 million Armenians.

The majority of historians estimate that between 1.5 and 2.1 million Armenians lived inside the Ottoman Empire in 1914. Of these, the Ottoman Empire expelled approximately 1.5 million Armenians from its territories.

== Armenian casualties from 1915 to 1917–18 ==
=== Ottoman and Turkish estimates ===
==== The statistics provided by Djemal ====
Map of Armenian casualties
- The destruction of Armenians in Ottoman Empire in 1914-17 The data in this map is from Talaat Pasha's own report on the Armenian genocide, as found and translated by the historian Ara Sarafian from the Ottoman Archives of Istanbul.

The official Ottoman statistics compiled for the period between 1915 and 1917–18 were of 800,000 killed. This figure originates from Djemal's bureau. The results were published in the official Ottoman gazette.

It was allegedly the result of a commission formed by the interior minister Mustafa Arif. It is said that they relied on reports and statistics they had compiled in a period of two months; on March 14, 1919, the results were made public by Djemal. This same figure was mentioned in Rauf Orbay's own memoirs. The initial results apparently represented those who were "massacred" during the deportation, without any indication as to the total number of people who perished. Mustafa Kemal, during a conversation with Major General Harbord, the chief of the American Military Mission to Armenia, in September 1919, repeated the same number. The figure of 800,000 excludes Armenian soldiers in the Ottoman army liquidated in the early stages of the genocide, as well as the number of women and male and female children assimilated into Turkish families.

However, following the dissolution of the military tribunal, those figures were reinterpreted. The Turkish author Taner Akçam refers to a Turkish military estimate published by Lt. Col. Nihat in 1928, in which the figure of 800,000 no longer represented those "massacred" or "killed", but simply those who perished. Then the historian Bayur in a famous work wrote: "800,000 Armenians and 200,000 Greeks died as a result of deportations or died in labor brigades." Bayur concluded: "According to our official sources, these numbers are correct."

==== The Remaining Documents of Talaat Pasha ====
Percentage of prewar Armenian population "unaccounted for" in 1917 based on Talat Pasha's record. Black means 100 percent of the prewar population is gone; red is the "resettlement" zone.

According to documents that once belonged to Talaat Pasha, more than 970,000 Ottoman Armenians disappeared from official population records from 1915 through 1916. In 1983, Talaat's widow, Hayriye Talaat Bafralı, gave the documents and records to Turkish journalist Murat Bardakçı, who published them in a book titled The Remaining Documents of Talat Pasha (also known as "Talat Pasha's Black Book"). According to the documents, the number of Armenians living in the Ottoman Empire before 1915 stood at 1,256,000. It was presumed, however, in a footnote by Talaat Pasha himself, that the Armenian population was undercounted by thirty percent. Furthermore, the population of Protestant Armenians was not taken into account. Therefore, according to the historian Ara Sarafian, the population of Armenians should have been approximately 1,700,000 prior to the start of the war. However, that number had plunged to 284,157 two years later in 1917.

==== Other Ottoman sources ====
While the official figures were of 800,000 killed, there were many unofficial numbers presented during the war by some Ottoman authorities—Talat, for instance, presented the figure of 300,000—but there is no indication as to how those figures were obtained. This figure is currently the one used often by the Turkish government officials.

=== Ottoman allies estimates ===
==== Germany ====
German sources gave the highest estimates of Armenian losses during the war even though they were the Ottoman Empire's ally. Some speculate that it was due to their access to murder sites. German major Endres, who served in the Turkish army, estimated the number of Armenian deaths as 1.2 million. The same figure was mentioned during the Yozgat trial, and before the Permanent Peoples' Tribunal and is often cited elsewhere.

==== Austria-Hungary ====
The Austrian consul at Trabzon and Samsun, Dr. Kwatkiowski on March 13, 1918, reported to Vienna, restricting himself to the six eastern provinces, Trabzon and Samsun district, that of the million deported, most died, while Austria-Hungary's Adrianople (Edirne) consul Dr. Nadamlenzki reported that for the entire Ottoman Empire 1.5 million had already been deported. The Austrian Vice Marshal Joseph Pomiankowski estimated the Armenian losses at about a million.

=== The allies and neutral parties ===
==== Arnold J. Toynbee ====
Arnold J. Toynbee, an intelligence officer of the British Foreign Office during World War I, estimated a death toll of 600,000 from a population of 1,800,000 Armenians who lived in Anatolia but excluded most of 1916 and the following years, as Robert Melson writes:

Toynbee's description and analysis stop with the winter of 1915 and the spring of 1916, by which time the bulk of the Armenian population has been killed or deported. As valuable as it is, this work cannot take into account what subsequently happened to the deportees in 1916, nor can it take into account the Armenians who were deported from some of the major urban areas after 1916.

==== The King Crane Commission ====
The King Crane Commission estimated a million for wartime losses, but also stated that the Hamidian massacres had been included. Whether or not the Armenian casualties were being deliberately understated to increase the Armenian population to support Armenian independence is still a matter of debate. The Armenian wartime losses of a million, the Adana massacres, and Hamidian massacres had been combined for the sake of what the commission at one point called "justice," in what appears to have been an attempt to maximize the population count. The Armenian estimates showed the same tendency. At times, they were even reduced to 500,000 when the high Armenian death count endangered the possibility of an Armenian state including Ottoman territory, and in other instances raised to over a million. The United States figures for the period between 1915 and 1917 vary widely, but most figures approach a million or more.

==== League of Nations ====
The League of Nations estimated one million dead.

== Armenian casualties, 1917–18 to 1923 ==
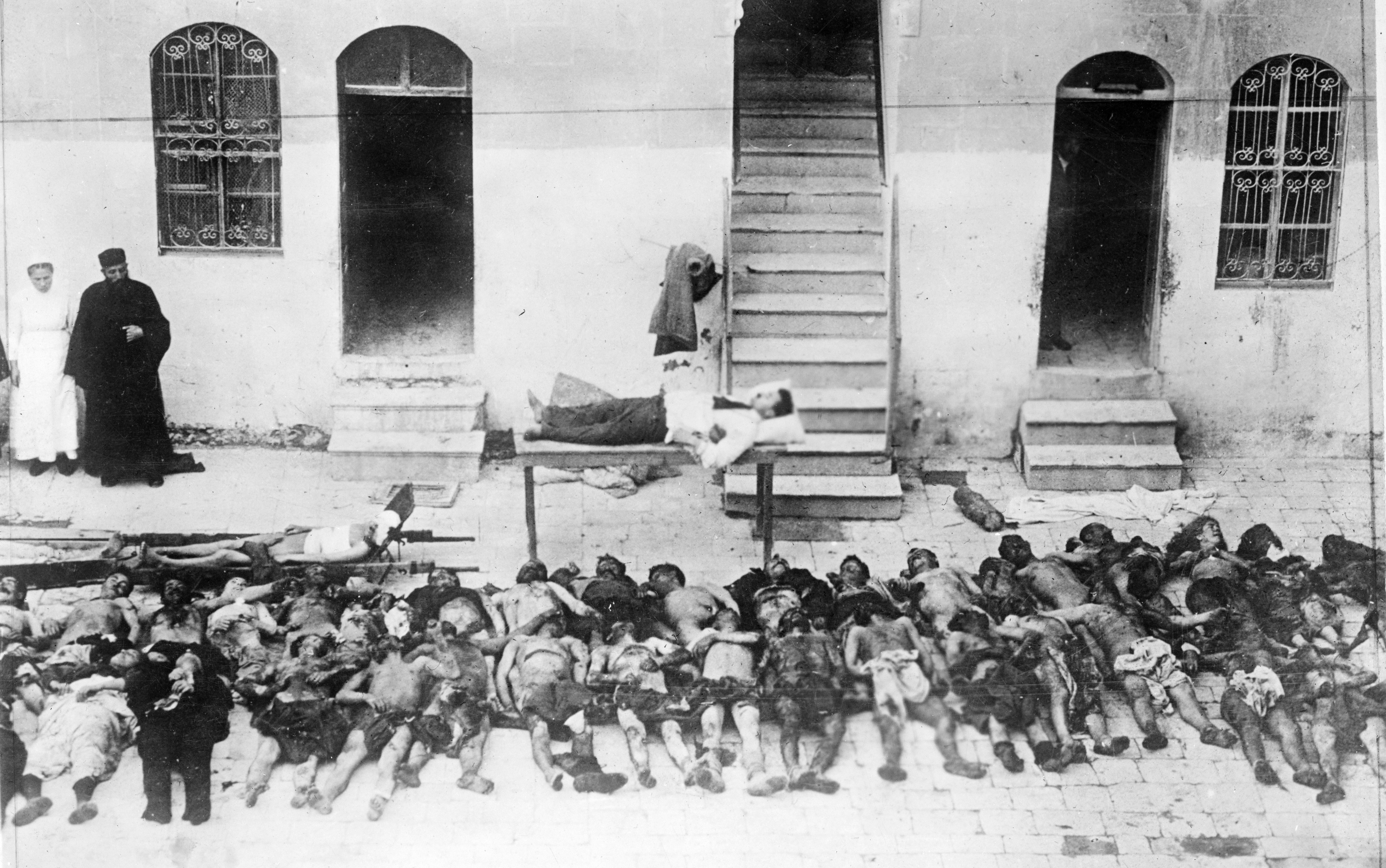
Forty Armenians massacred in February 1919, after the armistice

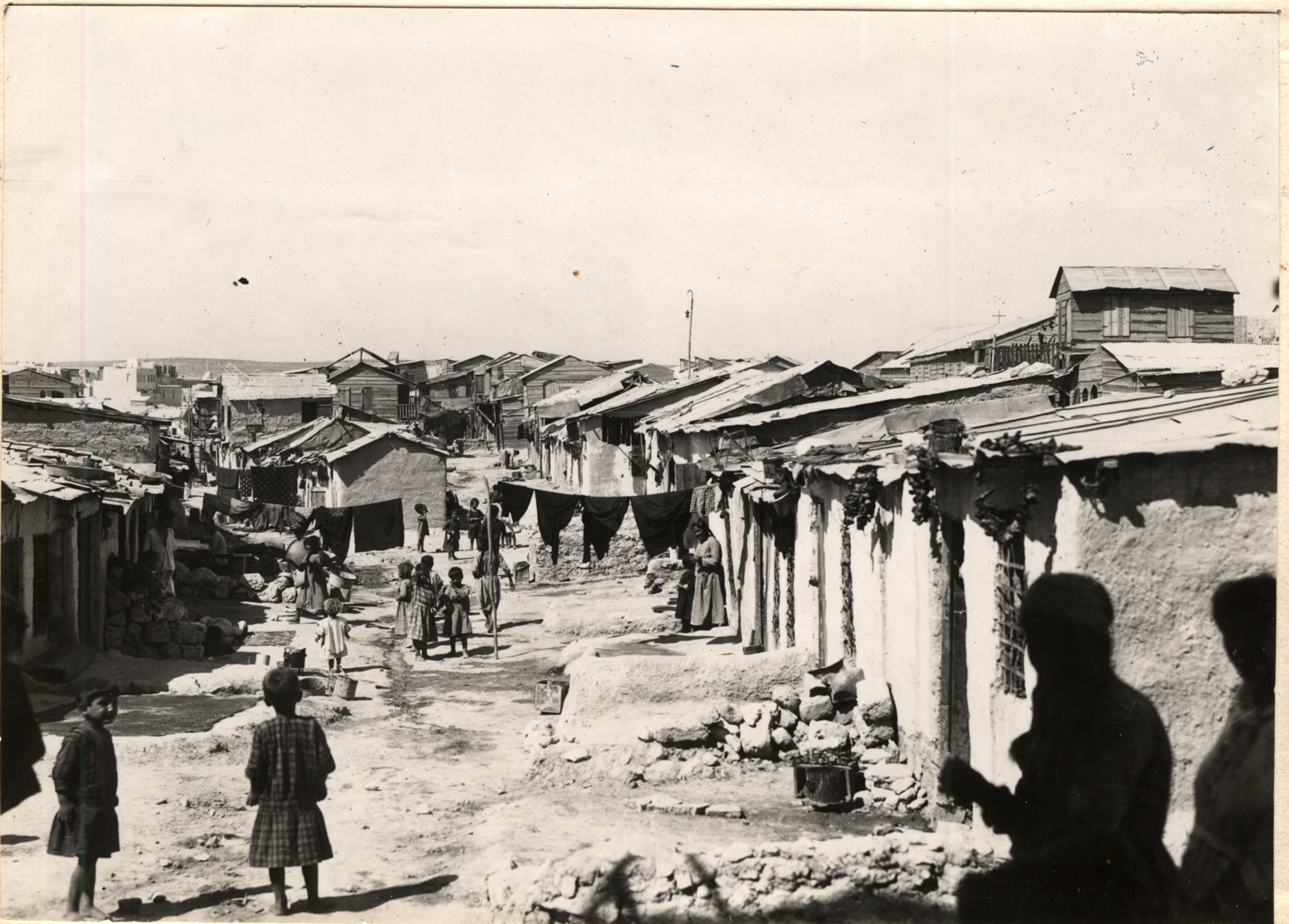
Armenian refugee camp in Aleppo, Syria, 1905. Photograph by Bodil Biørn

While the Ottoman official statistics covered 1917–18, and some of German figures, most other figures excluded them. Another problem remains, as to the availability of the sources for what followed 1917. More recent scholars have called this period the second phase of the Armenian genocide. Melson, for instance, provide' a rough estimate of 500,000. On the other hand, those estimates have no archival grounds, for this reason some researchers considers any such figures could be near to the actual casualty figures or far from it.

=== Armenian casualties outside of the Ottoman borders during Ottoman invasion ===
Few commissions were formed though, such as the investigations for Kars and Alexandropol. The Alexandropol investigation by its nature is seen as the most serious such endeavor. It presented 60,000 as directed killed, in a total of 150,000 victims which condition would have ultimately led to their death sentences. But the investigation apparently came to an end abruptly. The Germans on the other hand, not presenting any numbers, have reported Russian Armenia condition, in what they considered as an Ottoman attempt to destroy it. Without taking in account the Ottoman excursion of what was considered as Persian Armenia. An American source states that when the Ottomans invaded Northern Iran between 1915 and 1918, which was historically part of the Kingdom of Armenia forming the provinces of Parskahayk and the eastern part of Vaspurakan, they killed about 80,000 Armenians, and when they invaded the Russian-controlled Transcaucasia between 1918 and 1923 they killed about 175,000 Armenians.

=== Ottoman Armenian casualties ===
Most of the victims could be counted in Cilicia, as well as the Eastern zone, and in Smyrna (İzmir) during what was reported as massacres and what followed with the burning of the Armenian and Greek quarters of the city (see Great Fire of Smyrna). While the total of casualties in this category is estimated to tens of thousands to over hundred of thousand, the number of victims is not well established.

== Recent estimates ==
According to Armenian-American historian Richard G. Hovannisian, the range of the death toll is between 600,000 and 2 million. However, recent scholarship give figures of around 800,000 to 1.2 million Armenians that were deported in 1915–1916. It's estimated that only 200,000 of these were still alive by the end of 1916.

== Denialist and Turkish-affiliated estimates ==
Justin McCarthy's figures are often cited, particularly in works that support the Turkish government's claims that the Armenian massacres do not constitute genocide. Although a Western academic, McCarthy's statistics on Armenian casualties and fatalities are derived from his statistics of Armenian population, which, in turn, were derived from Ottoman records (by applying correction values). Some scholars (including Aviel Roshwald) consider his figures to be an Ottoman source rather than a Western one. "

McCarthy calculated an estimate of the pre-war Armenian population, then subtracted his estimate of survivors, arriving at a figure of a little less than 600,000 for Armenian casualties for the period 1914 to 1922. As in the cases of his population, his statistics are controversial. In a more recent essay, he projected that if the Armenian records of 1913 were accurate, 250,000 more deaths should be added, for a total of 850,000. McCarthy is also criticized for overestimating the number of survivors. Historical researcher Frédéric Paulin goes as far as to compare his methodology with Rassinier's method in calculating the European Jewry losses during World War II.

In 1991, Levon Marashlian (arriving at a figure of 1.2 million) argued that McCarthy's approach suffers from a fatal methodological flaw: in basing his results on inaccurate records. Marashlian maintains there was a reciprocal undercounting on the Ottoman's government's part on the one hand, and underreporting by Armenians, on the other.
