= Land usurpation =

Appropriation of land

Land usurpation is the appropriation of land from the previous or lawful owner.
