= Bab Ali demonstration =

- Part of Hamidian massacres
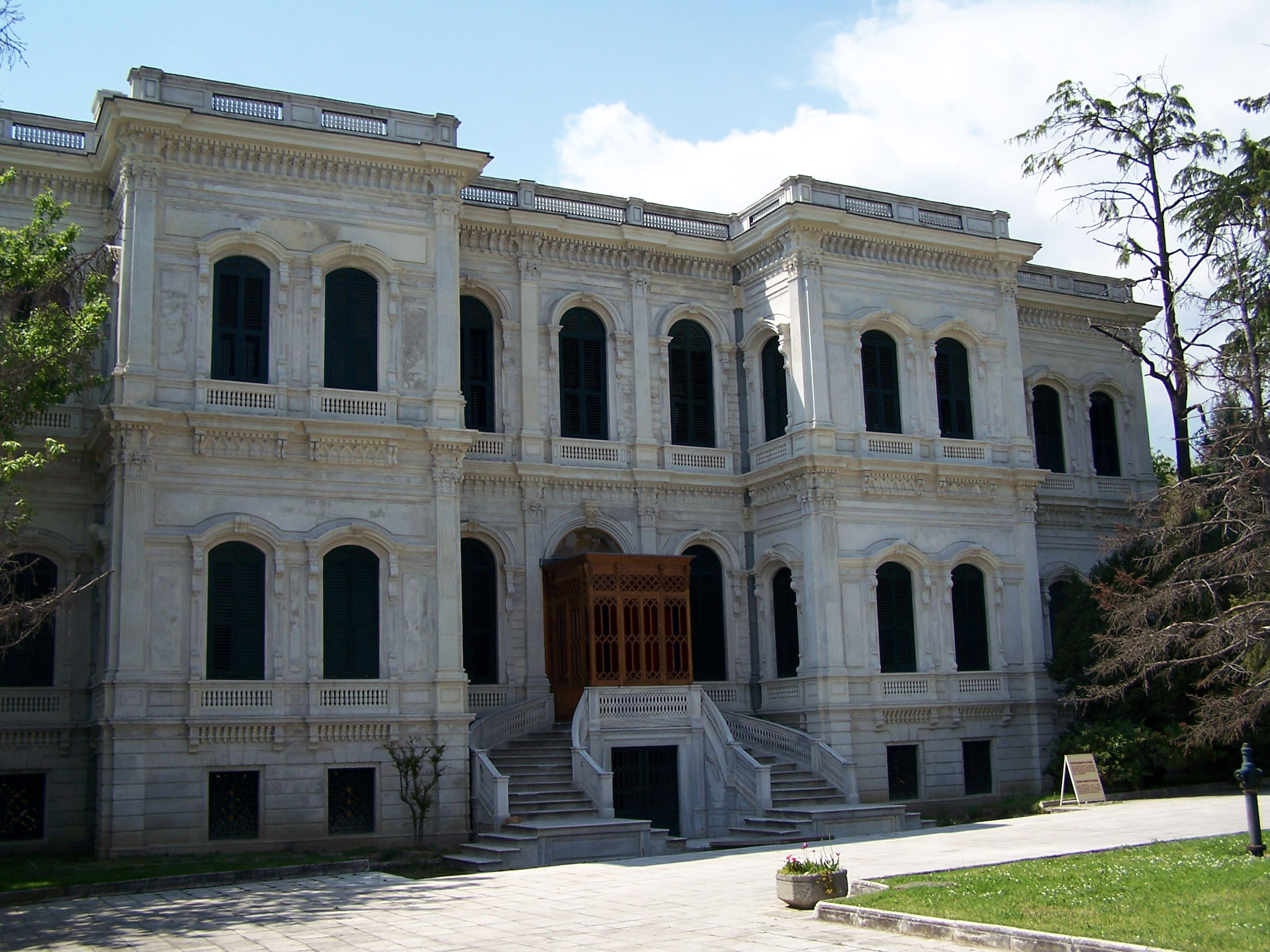
- The Yıldız Palace, main residence of the Ottoman sultan
- Date: 30 September 1895
- Location: Sublime Porte, Constantinople, Ottoman Empire
- Caused by: Armenian demands for reforms, persecution of Armenians
- Goals: Implementation of reforms, protection from violence, equal rights
- Methods: Peaceful protest, petition delivery
- Result: Massacre of protesters, escalation of the Hamidian massacres

Parties
Hunchak activists Armenian demonstrators	(Ottoman Empire) Ottoman government (Ottoman Empire) Ottoman military

Lead figures
Garo Sahakian	Abdul Hamid II

Number
Protestors: 2000-4000	

Casualties
- Deaths: 2000
- Injuries: Several hundred
- Arrested: Several hundred

The Bab Ali demonstration (Note: Armenian: Բաբը Ալիի ցույց, Turkish: Bâb-ı Âli Gösterisi) was a peaceful protest by Armenian activists in Constantinople, Ottoman Empire, demanding reforms and an end to persecution. The demonstration, organized by the Hunchak party, culminated in a violent crackdown by Ottoman authorities. The event was part of the Hamidian massacres.

In September 1895 the Hunchak party organised a demonstration in front of the Bab-i Ali (the seat of the government) in order to induce the European powers, who had been charged by the Treaty of San Stefano of 1878 with ensuring reform was implemented, to address the failure of the Ottoman government to carry out reforms.

According to historian Richard Hovannisian, in September 1895, the Social Democrat Hunchakian Party notified the European powers of their intention to organize a peaceful demonstration in Constantinople to protest the Sasun massacre. The demonstrators carried petitions demanding civil liberties, the right to bear arms, the rehabilitation of the Sasun region, an end to Kurdish migration into Armenian-populated areas, and the recruitment of Armenians into the Ottoman police force.

== Background ==
Background and Diplomatic Context

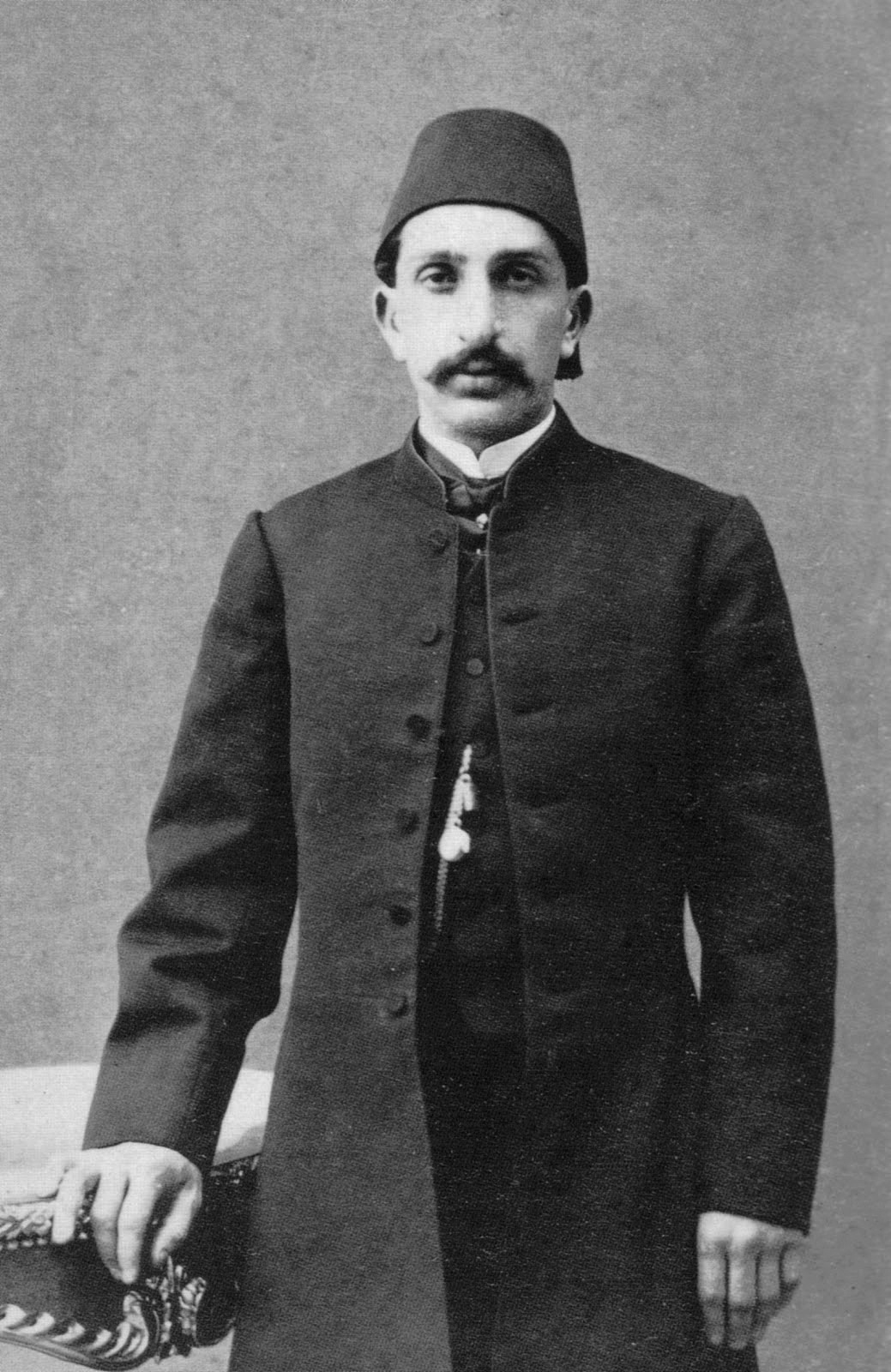
Abdul Hamid in 1868.

In the late 19th century, Armenians in the Ottoman Empire faced systemic discrimination, land confiscations, and violence from Kurdish tribes and local authorities. The demonstration, occurred amid protracted negotiations between the Great Powers and the Ottoman Empire over proposed reforms in the Armenian-populated provinces of the empire. These reforms, intended to address longstanding grievances of Ottoman Armenians, were part of a broader diplomatic initiative led by European powers, particularly the United Kingdom, France, and Russia. By the summer of 1895, Ottoman authorities had begun resisting the proposed measures, seeking either to block their implementation entirely or significantly dilute their scope. British Foreign Secretary Lord Salisbury attempted to assuage Ottoman concerns, assuring the Turkish ambassador that the reforms did not aim to grant autonomy or exclusive privileges to Armenians but rather to ensure "measures of justice and equal treatment" within the existing imperial framework. Armenian political organizations, such as the Armenian Revolutionary Federation (ARF) and the Hunchak party, emerged to advocate for rights through petitions and, later, armed resistance.

=== Hunchakian Mobilization and Ultimatum ===
Frustrated by the stagnation of reform efforts, the Social Democrat Hunchakian Party, a leading Armenian revolutionary organization, escalated its activism. On September 28, 1895, the group dispatched a letter to Sultan Abdul Hamid II and the Great Powers, announcing plans for a peaceful demonstration in Constantinople to demand immediate implementation of the reforms. The letter explicitly warned against Ottoman interference:

Your Excellency, the Armenians of Constantinople have decided to make shortly a demonstration, of a strictly peaceful character, in order to give expression to their wishes with regard to the reforms to be introduced in the Armenian provinces. As it is not intended that this demonstration shall be in any way aggressive, the intervention of the police and military for the purpose of preventing it may have regrettable consequences, for which we disclaim before hand all responsibility. Organizing Committee

This ultimatum underscored the Hunchakists' resolve to leverage public pressure while attempting to preempt accusations of provocation. The demonstration, planned to march toward the Sublime Porte (Bab Ali) in advance to the European embassies and the police, the seat of Ottoman government, marked a critical moment in the escalating tensions between Armenian reformists and the imperial administration. On 30 September 1895, approximately 2,000–4,000 Armenians gathered in Constantinople's Kumkapı district and marched toward the Sublime Porte. The event was derisively termed the "Stupid Demonstration" in English official reports.

== The Demonstration ==
On 28 September 1895, two days before the planned protest, the Hunchak Party alerted foreign embassies in Constantinople to their intention to hold a peaceful demonstration at Bâb-ı Âli, emphasizing that any violence would stem from Ottoman authorities. The executive committee chose three men to supervise the demonstration after receiving the order from the board of directors. The leader was Garo Sahakian. At the request of Patriarch Izmirlian and with the approval of the Hunchak governing body, it was decided that the demonstration would be peaceful, a brief letter regarding this would be sent to the consulates, and a complaint and request letter written by Mihran Damadian would be submitted to the Sublime Porte. Garo, leader of the demonstration, was to present the sultan a petition on behalf of the Armenians of the six provinces and Constantinople. On September 30, 1895, a demonstration organized by the Social Democrat Hunchakian Party in Constantinople, aimed at presenting reform demands to Sultan Abdul Hamid II, prompted a significant response from the Committee of Union and Progress (CUP). Their petition demanded equal civil rights, equitable taxation, guarantees for security of life, property, and honor, an end to Kurdish raids, and Armenian rights to bear arms if Kurdish forces were not disarmed. It was the first time in the history of the Ottoman Empire that a demonstration against the government had taken place in Constantinople. The CUP, viewing the protest as a challenge to Ottoman authority, publicly condemned what it termed "Armenian impudence." The group distributed flyers across Istanbul urging Muslims to resist the perceived affront, declaring: "Muslims and our most beloved Turkish compatriots! The Armenians have become so bold as to assault the Sublime Porte, which is our country’s greatest place and which is respected and recognized by all Europeans. They have shaken the very foundations of our capital. We are greatly distressed at these impudent actions by our Armenian compatriots…" This marked the CUP's first organized public mobilization, signaling its emergence as a political force opposed to Armenian nationalist activities. The police, acting on "secret orders emanating from the Palace," equipped Muslim mobs with "secret weapons, especially thick cudgels." Attackers murdered hundreds of the Armenian marchers. Ottoman police, army units, and troops violently suppressed the protest, killing approximately 2,000 Armenians. The massacre triggered further anti-Armenian pogroms across the capital. Eyewitness accounts describe indiscriminate killings, with soldiers and mobs attacking Armenians in the streets. However reports of these events, often exaggerated or inaccurate. The violence quickly spread to other neighborhoods, including Galata and Pera, where Armenian businesses and homes were looted.

Initially, the CUP sought structured collaboration with Armenian revolutionary groups abroad. Early efforts included meetings in London facilitated by Mizanci Murat, a prominent CUP ideologue. Though these discussions yielded no concrete agreements, Murat advocated for further coordination within the Ottoman Empire. Following his recommendations, clandestine contacts were established in Erzurum between CUP members and Armenian activists. However, these efforts were disrupted when Ottoman authorities intercepted compromising documents, leading to arrests. In reaction, the two groups organized their first joint demonstrations against Abdul Hamid II's regime, reflecting a brief, tenuous alliance amid growing anti-government sentiment.

The following account, written by an American eyewitness in Constantinople with direct access to verified facts, illustrates how the Sultan deliberately orchestrated conditions to justify violence against Christians:

It was remarkable that the Turks so stubbornly opposed the Armenians' attempt to present their petition to the Sublime Porte. Such resistance violated local custom and could only be interpreted as deliberate hostility—unless the Armenians had instigated violence first, which they firmly denied. When Grand Vizier Said Pasha informed the Sultan of the planned demonstration and sought his instructions, the Sultan entrusted the matter to the Grand Vizier and the Minister of the Interior, granting them full authority. They agreed to allow the petition, deploying troops discreetly nearby as a precaution. Yet, just as the Grand Vizier prepared to receive the Armenians, the Sultan abruptly reversed the decision, ordering his forces to disperse any gatherings. Thus, the responsibility for the ensuing bloodshed lay entirely with this rash and ill-advised intervention, which overruled the ministers' careful arrangements.

== Aftermath ==
Despite being violently suppressed by Ottoman forces, the Hunchaks claimed success when Sultan Abdul Hamid II signed the May reforms in October 1895 under European pressure, asserting their protest had compelled his concession. The party hailed the outcome as a “great victory” in public statements. However, the reforms were never implemented, and the demonstration instead. The massacre in Constantinople triggered a wave of anti-Armenian violence across the empire, particularly in eastern provinces such as Trabzon, Erzurum, Urfa when nearly 3,000 Armenians who had taken refuge in the cathedral of Urfa were burned alive, and Diyarbakır. The violence was terroristic, leading to hundreds of thousands of civilian fatalities. News reports, as well as dozens of books published at the time, describe immolations, flaying, rape, dismemberment, and massacre. Overwhelmingly, the vilayets in the east bore the brunt of the killings. The goal was to undermine Armenian support of the Russians in their perennial war with the Ottomans. Historian Vahakn Dadrian characterized this period as inaugurating a "culture of massacre" in Ottoman Asia Minor, establishing patterns of state-sanctioned violence against minority populations that persisted into the early 20th century. This framework, Dadrian argued, laid the groundwork for later genocidal policies during World War I. With the connivance of the government, massacres started in Constantinople during which about 6000 Armenians were killed. The Hamidian massacres thus mark a critical juncture in the escalation of ethno-religious tensions within the empire, foreshadowing the catastrophic events of the Armenian Genocide (1915–1917). Historians estimate that between 100,000 and 300,000 Armenians were killed in the Hamidian massacres (1894–1896). The Ottoman government employed irregular forces, including Hamidiye regiments, to carry out atrocities.

In the hope of calling attention to their cause, Armenian revolutionaries seized Istanbul's Ottoman Bank to protest; ensuing government-backed mob violence killed over 5,000 Armenians. The failure of reforms radicalized Armenian groups, leading to increased militant resistance. The massacres drew international outrage as news of the atrocities spread across Europe and the United States. Foreign governments and humanitarian organizations condemned the killings, with Western media branding Abdul Hamid as the "Bloody Sultan" or "Red Sultan" for his role in the systematic persecution.

== See also ==
- Kum Kapu demonstration
- 1895 Armenian reforms
