= Sasun Resistance =

The Sasun Resistance by the Armenian militia against the Ottoman Empire may refer to:

- Sasun Resistance (1894)
- Sasun Resistance (1904)
- Sasun Resistance (1915)
