= Armenian fedayi =

1880s–1920s Armenian militants formed in response to massacres

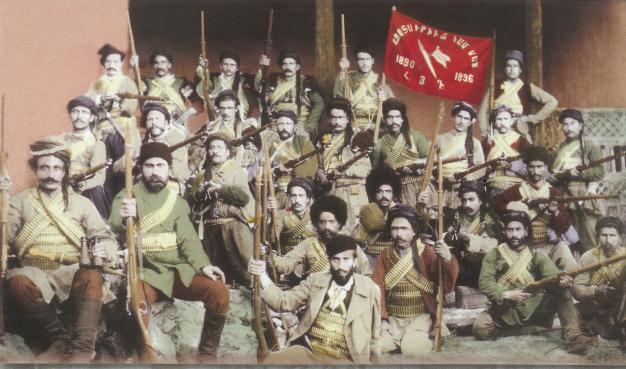
- A fedayi group fighting under the ARF banner. The banner reads Liberty or Death.
- Active: 1880s–1920s
- Country: Ottoman Empire; Russian Empire; Qajar Iran
- Allegiance: Armenians: Dashnak; Hunchak; Armenakan
- Type: Militia
- Size: 40,000 during the Armenian genocide
- Engagements: Armenian national movement Persian Constitutional Revolution; Resistance during the Armenian genocide

Commanders
- Before 1893: Arabo
- 1893–1899: Aghbiur Serob
- 1899–1904: Andranik
- 1904–1907: Kevork Chavush

Fedayi, (Note: Eastern Armenian: Ֆիդայի, romanized: Fidayi; Western Armenian: Ֆէտայի, Fedayi; Turkish: Ermeni milisleri, çeteleri, fedaileri; French: Fédaïs arméniens) also known as the Armenian irregular units, Armenian militia, or Armenian Hayduks were Armenian civilians who voluntarily left their families to form self-defense units and irregular armed-bands in reaction to the mass murder of Armenians and the pillage of Armenian villages by criminals, Turkish and Kurdish gangs, Ottoman forces, and Hamidian guards during the reign of Ottoman sultan Abdul Hamid II in the late 19th and early 20th centuries, known as the Hamidian massacres. Their ultimate goal was always to gain Armenian autonomy (for Armenakans) or independence (for Dashnaks and for Hunchaks)–depending on their ideology and the degree of oppression visited on Armenians.

The fedayi movement was especially active in Western Armenia (modern day Turkey) and declined after the 1904 Sasun uprising. Some of the key fedayi figures also participated in the Iranian Constitutional Revolution that commenced during the same period, upon agreement of the ARF leaders.

The Armenian term fedayi ultimately derives from the Arabic word fedayeen (فدائيون, fidā'īyūn), literally meaning 'those who sacrifice'. The term hayduk was also used interchangeably as well and derived from the Hungarian word hajduk, meaning "foot soldier".

== History ==
=== Goals and activities ===
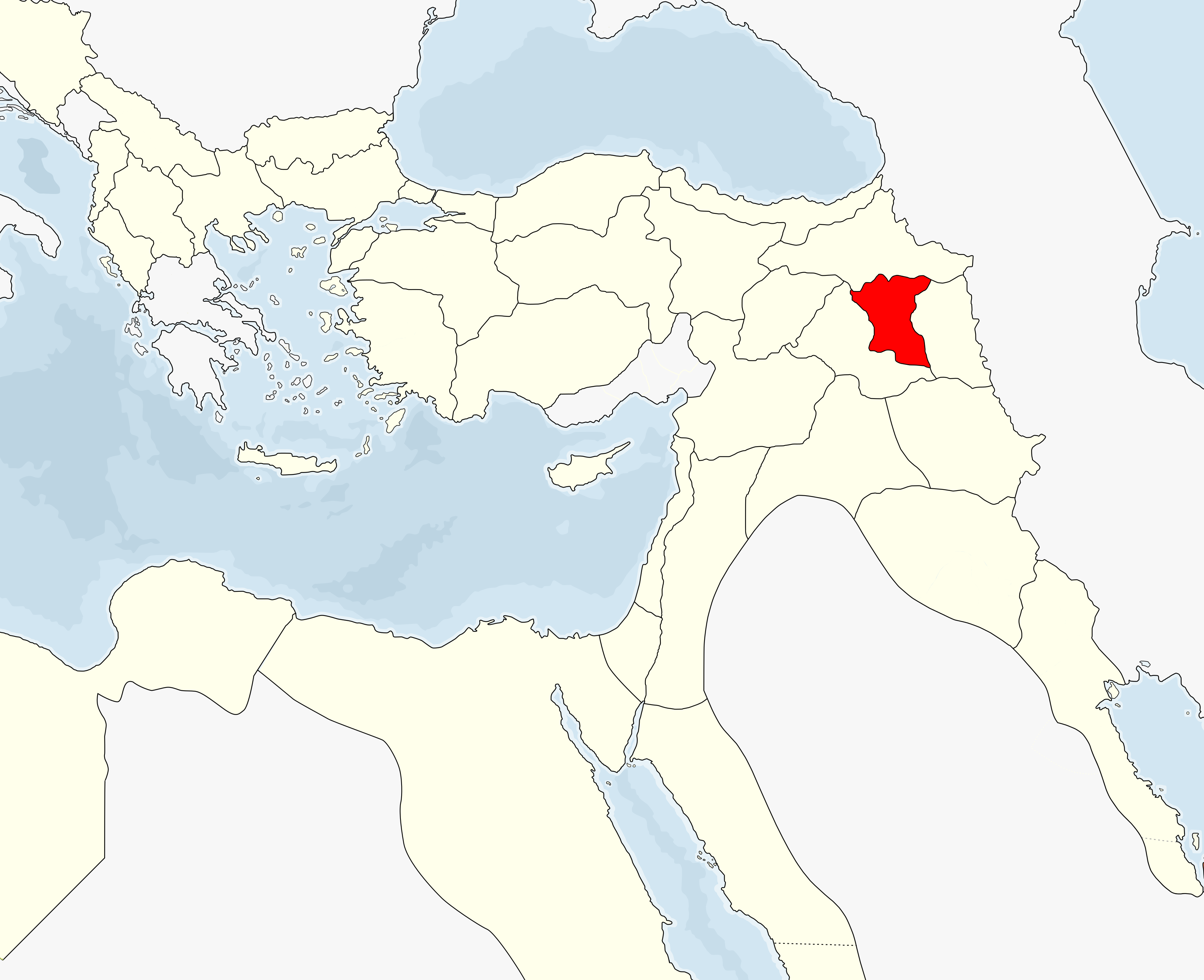
The Bitlis Vilayet (historic Taron) was the center of fedayi operations in the late 19th century and early 20th century.

Armenian fedayis' main goal was to defend Armenian villages in Western Armenia from persecution and at the same time, disrupt the Ottoman Empire's activities in Armenian populated regions. Armenian volunteers fought during the Hamidian massacres, Sasun Resistance (1894), Zeitun Rebellion (1895–1896), Defense of Van, and Khanasor Expedition. They were the leaders and members of the Armenian national movement. These bands sabotaged telegraph lines and raided army supplies. They also committed assassinations and counter-attacks on Muslim villages. They helped Armenians defend themselves during village purges by Ottoman officials. They were supported by Armenians and quickly gained fame, support and trust by them.

Their activities in the Ottoman Empire dissipated after the Second Constitutional Era of the Ottoman Empire, when the Committee of Union and Progress came into power and, for a time, granted the Empire's Armenian citizens the same rights as its Turkish and Kurdish citizens. Most fedayi groups then disbanded, their members returning to their families.

==== Persian Constitutional Revolution ====
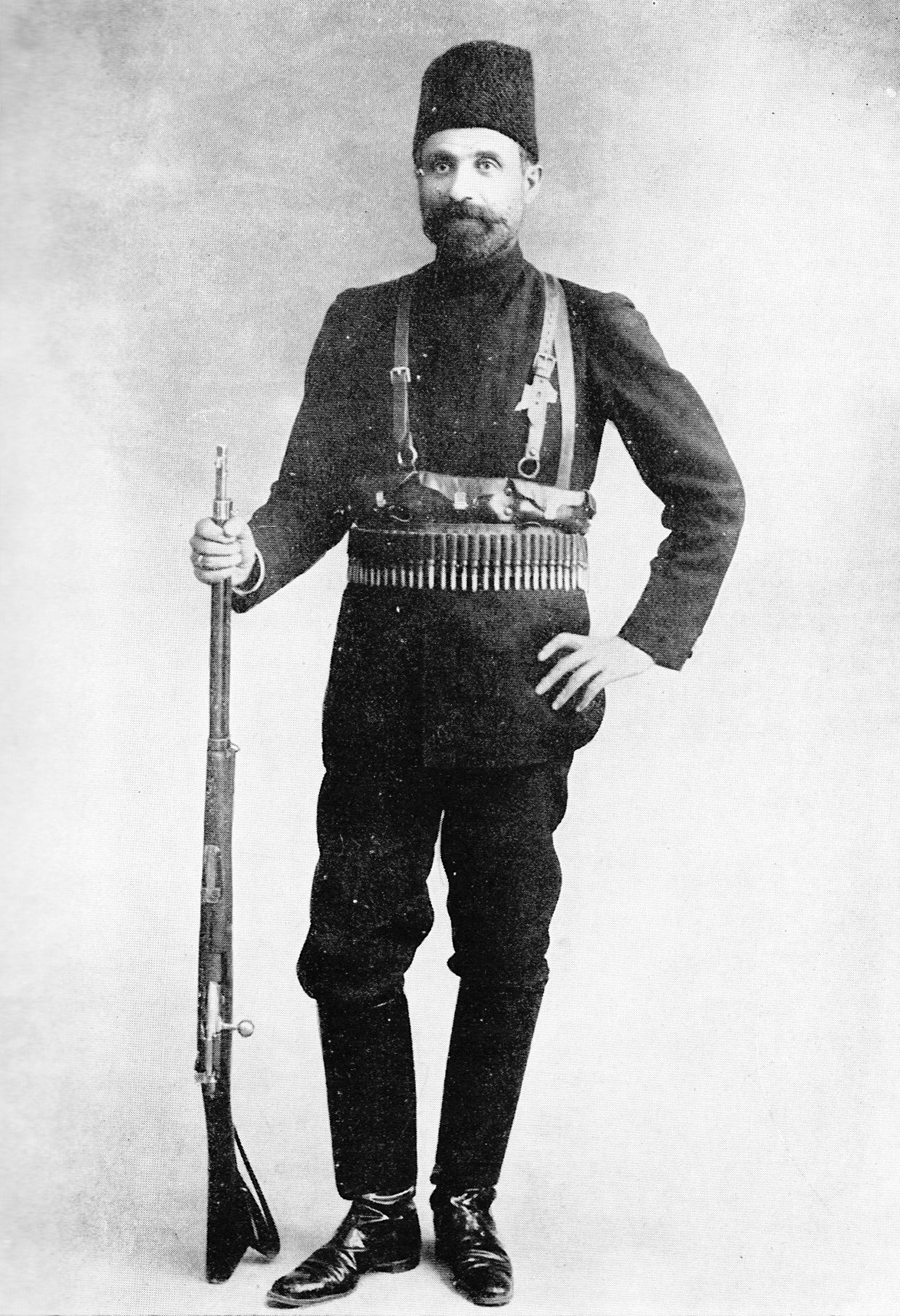
Yeprem Khan was a revolutionary leader of Iran and a key figure of the revolution

Several fedayi and ARF key figures such as Aram Manukian, Hamo Ohanjanyan and Stepan Stepanian agreed upon joining the ongoing Iranian Constitutional Revolution in neighboring Qajar Persia.

They established that the movement was one that had political, ideological and economic components and was thus aimed at establishing law and order, human rights and the interests of all working people. They also felt that it would work for the benefit and interest of Armenian-Iranians. The final vote was 25 votes in favour and one absentia.

==== World War I ====
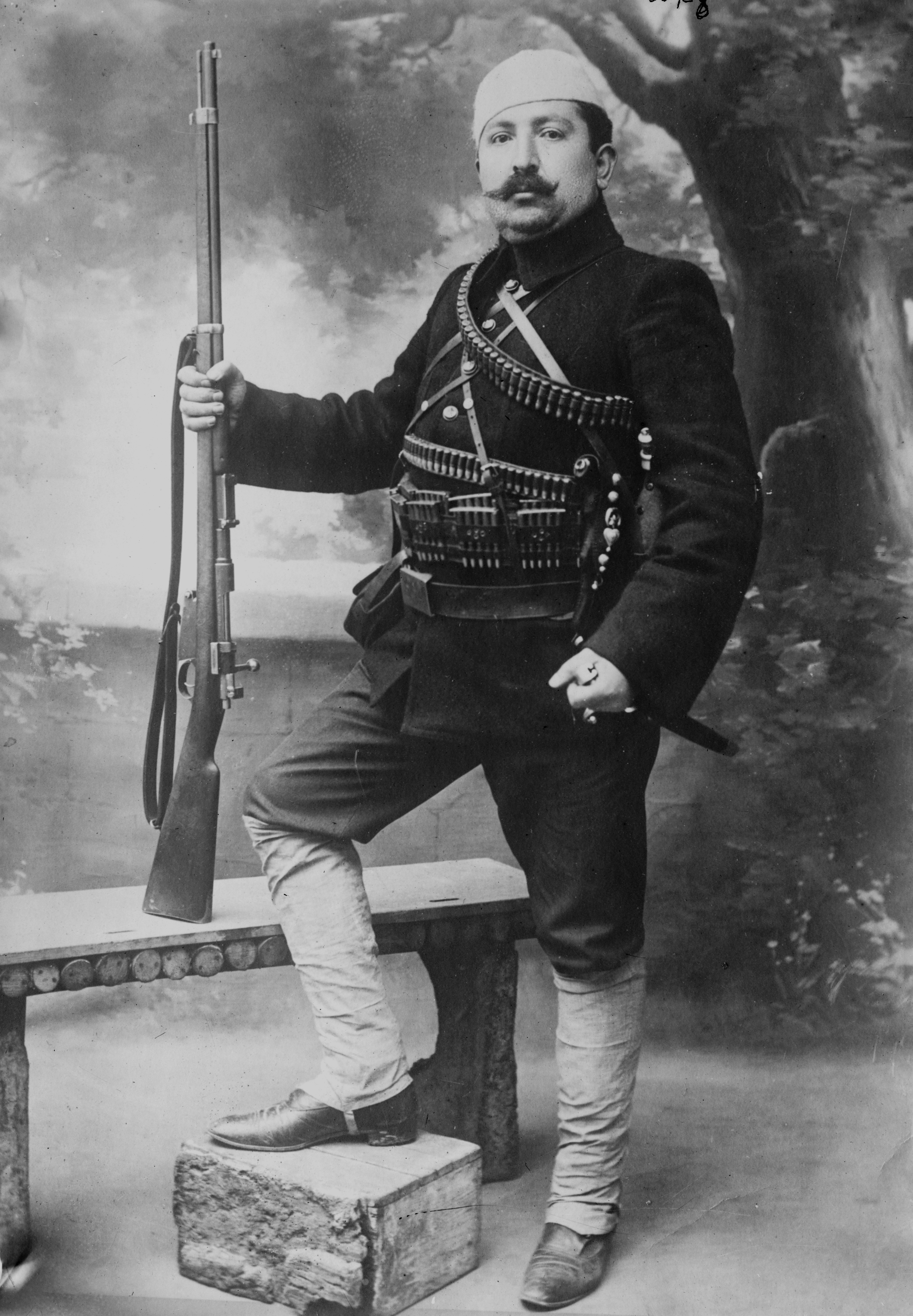
A photo of an Armenian volunteer from the Library of Congress

Some fedayi groups joined the Ottoman army after the Ottoman government passed a new law to support the war effort that required all enabled adult males up to the age of 45 to either be recruited in the Ottoman army or to pay special fees (which would be used in the war effort) to be excluded from service. As a result of this law, most able-bodied men were removed from their homes, leaving only the women, children, and elderly by themselves. Most of the Armenian recruits were later turned into road laborers, out of which many were executed.

The genocide, committed during World War I by the Ottoman Empire, gave way to the return of the fedayis, who reorganised themselves once again inside the borders of the Ottoman Empire. In turn, tens of thousands of Armenians volunteered to be drafted in several different armies. These Armenian volunteer units were formed inside the Russian army to fight against the Ottoman Empire.

The Russian Caucasus Front collapsed following the abdication of the Tsar. In 1917, the Armenian Congress of Eastern Armenians asked the Armenian soldiers and officers scattered throughout Russian occupied regions to gradually be brought together. The plan was to mobilize Armenians on the Caucasian front. With that purpose in view, an Armenian Military Committee was formed with General Bagradouni as its president. That year, the Armenian National Congress created the Armenian National Council, which established the First Republic of Armenia. These Armenian conscripts and volunteers from the Russian Army later established the core of the armed forces of the First Republic of Armenia. Armenian refugees from the Ottoman Empire were flooding the newly formed Armenian state. Further southeast, in Van, the fedayis helped the local Armenians resist the Turkish army until April 1918, but eventually were forced to evacuate and withdraw to Persia.

To consider emergency measures, the Western Armenian Administration sponsored a conference which adopted plans to form a 20,000-man militia under Andranik in December 1917. Civilian commissioner Dr. Hakob Zavriev promoted Andranik to Major General and he took the command of Armenia within the Ottoman Empire. They fought in numerous successful battles such as the Battle of Kara Killisse, the Battle of Bash Abaran and the Battle of Sardarapat, as fedayees merged with the Armenian army (Yerevan centered) under General Tovmas Nazarbekian.

The total number of guerrillas in these irregular bands was 40,000–50,000, according to Boghos Nubar, the president of the Armenian National Delegation in the Paris Peace Conference of 1919, who wrote:

In the Caucasus, where, without mentioning the 150,000 Armenians in the Imperial Russian Army, more than 40,000 of their volunteers helped to liberate part of the Armenian vilayets, and where, under the command of their leaders, Antranik and Nazerbekoff, they alone, among the peoples of the Caucasus, offered resistance to the Turkish armies, from the beginning of the Bolshevist withdrawal right up to the signing of an armistice."

Boghos Nubar, as part of the Armenian Delegation, intended to expand the independent First Republic of Armenia. Thus, he might have elevated the number of Armenian fedayees who were able to fight to show that the Armenians were capable of defending an eventually large Ottoman–Armenian border. In reality, their numbers at that time were much lower, considering that there were no more than a few handful of fedayees in most of the confrontations between them and Kurdish irregulars or Turkish soldiers, even according to foreign accounts. Moreover, many of the fedayees were the same and reappeared in various places and battles. One should also note that many Armenian irregular fighters died defending regions of Western Armenia during the Armenian genocide.

== Notable fedayis ==
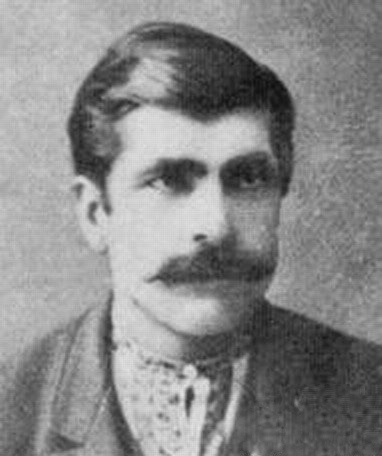
Arabo

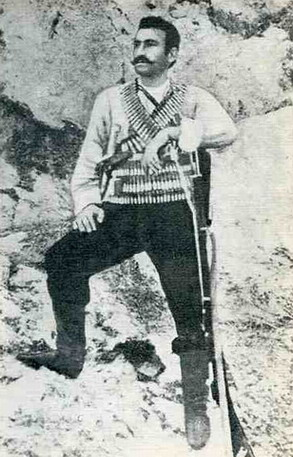
Kevork Chavush

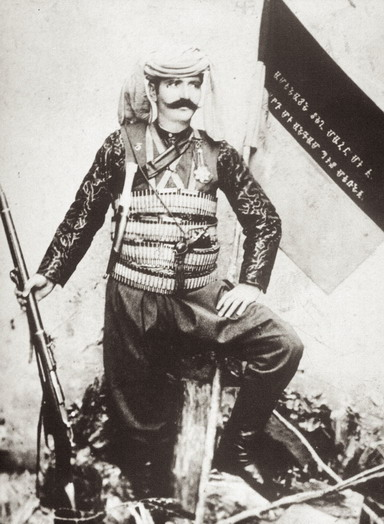
Andranik

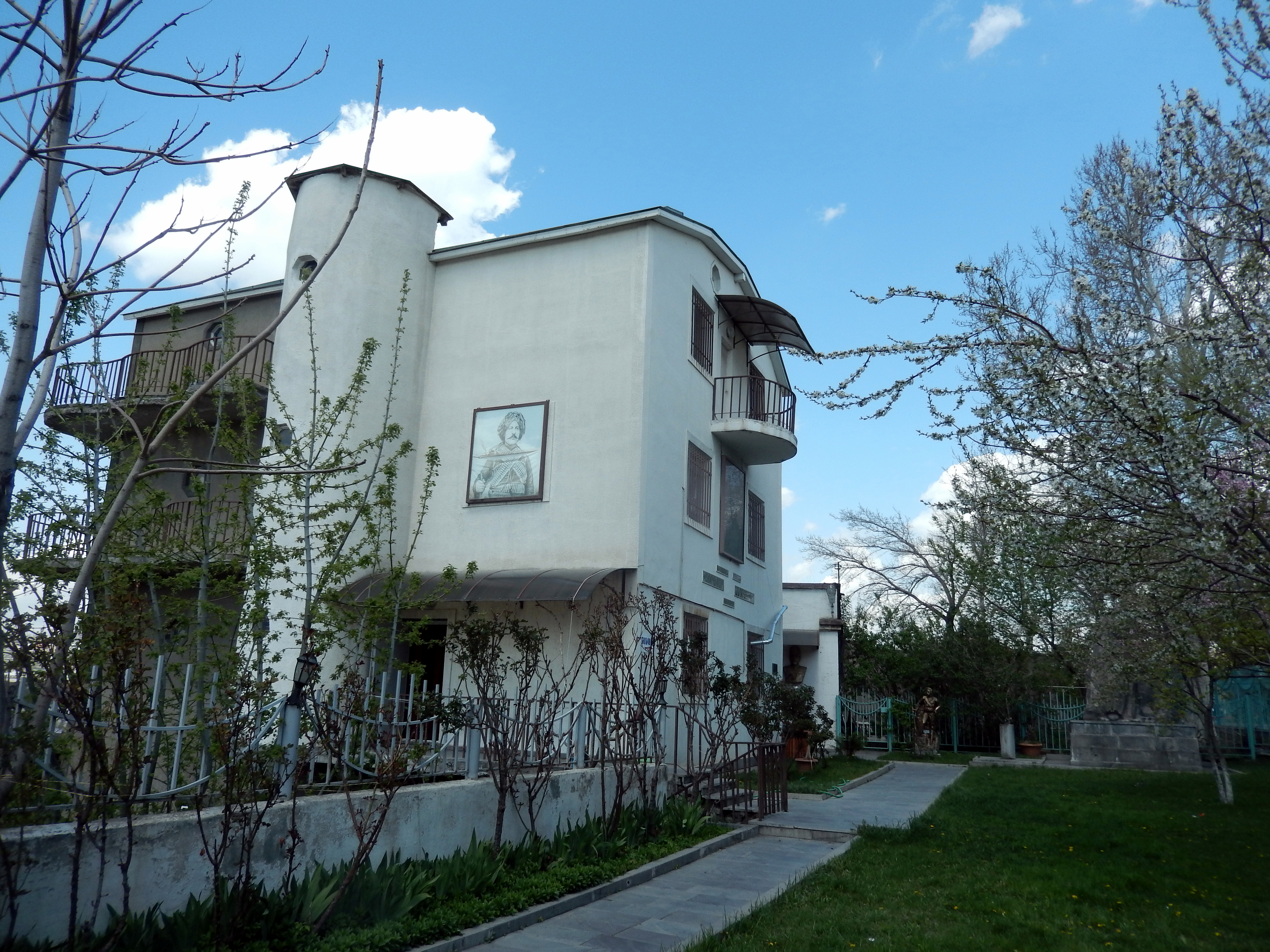
The Museum of Fedayis named after Andranik, Yerevan

Nom de guerre	Years active (as fedayees)	Operation location(s)	Political affiliation
Arabo	1880s–1893	Western Armenia	Dashnak
Girayr	1880s–1894	Western Armenia	Hunchak
Papken Siuni	–1896	Western Armenia, Constantinople	Dashnak
Aghbiur Serob	1891–1899	Western Armenia	Dashnak
Hrayr Dzhoghk	1880s–1904	Western Armenia	Hunchak, Dashnak
Kevork Chavush	1890–1907	Western Armenia	Hunchak, Dashnak
Sevkaretsi Sako	–1908	Western Armenia, Iran	Dashnak
Yeprem Khan	1880s–1912	Western Armenia, Iran	Dashnak
Nikol Duman	–1914	Western Armenia, Eastern Armenia	Dashnak
Medzn Mourad	1880s–1915	Western Armenia	Hunchak
Ishkhan	– 1915	Western Armenia	Dashnak
Paramaz	1890s–1915	Eastern Armenia	Hunchak
Keri	1880s–1916	Western Armenia, Iran, Eastern Armenia	Dashnak
Hovsep Arghutian	1889–1918	Western Armenia	Dashnak
Armenak Yekarian	1890s–1918	Western Armenia	Armenakan
Sebastatsi Murad	1890s–1918	Western Armenia, Eastern Armenia, Baku	Hunchak, Dashnak
Andranik	1895–1919	Western Armenia, Bulgaria, Zangezur	Hunchak, Dashnak
Aram Manukian	1903–1919	Western Armenia, Eastern Armenia	Dashnak
Sose Mayrig	1890s–1920	Western Armenia	Dashnak
Hamazasp	1890–1920	Western Armenia, Eastern Armenia	Dashnak
Dro	1914–1920	Western Armenia, Eastern Armenia	Dashnak
Vartan	1890–1920s	Western Armenia, Eastern Armenia	Dashnak
Garegin Nzhdeh	1908–1921	Iran, Balkans, Eastern Armenia (particularly Zangezur)	Dashnak
Makhluto	1880s–1921	Western Armenia, Eastern Armenia, Zangezur	Dashnak
Armen Garo	1895–1922	Western Armenia, Eastern Armenia	Dashnak
Tuman Tumyan	1901–1906	Western Armenia, Eastern Armenia	Dashnak
Sarkis Kukunian	1890–1910	Western Armenia, Eastern Armenia	Dashnak
Balabekh Karapet	1890s–1915	Western Armenia	Dashnak
Vazgen	1890s–1898	Western Armenia, Iran	Dashnak
Bulgharatsi Petros	1890s–1901	Western Armenia, Eastern Armenia, Iran	Dashnak

== See also ==
- Armenian genocide
- Armenian volunteer units
- ASALA
- Fedayeen

== Bibliography ==
- Vartanian, H.K. The Western Armenian Liberation Struggle Yerevan, 1967
- Translated from the Armenian: Mihran Kurdoghlian, Badmoutioun Hayots, C. hador [Armenian History, volume III], Athens, Greece, 1996, pg. 59–62.
