= Sebastatsi Murad =

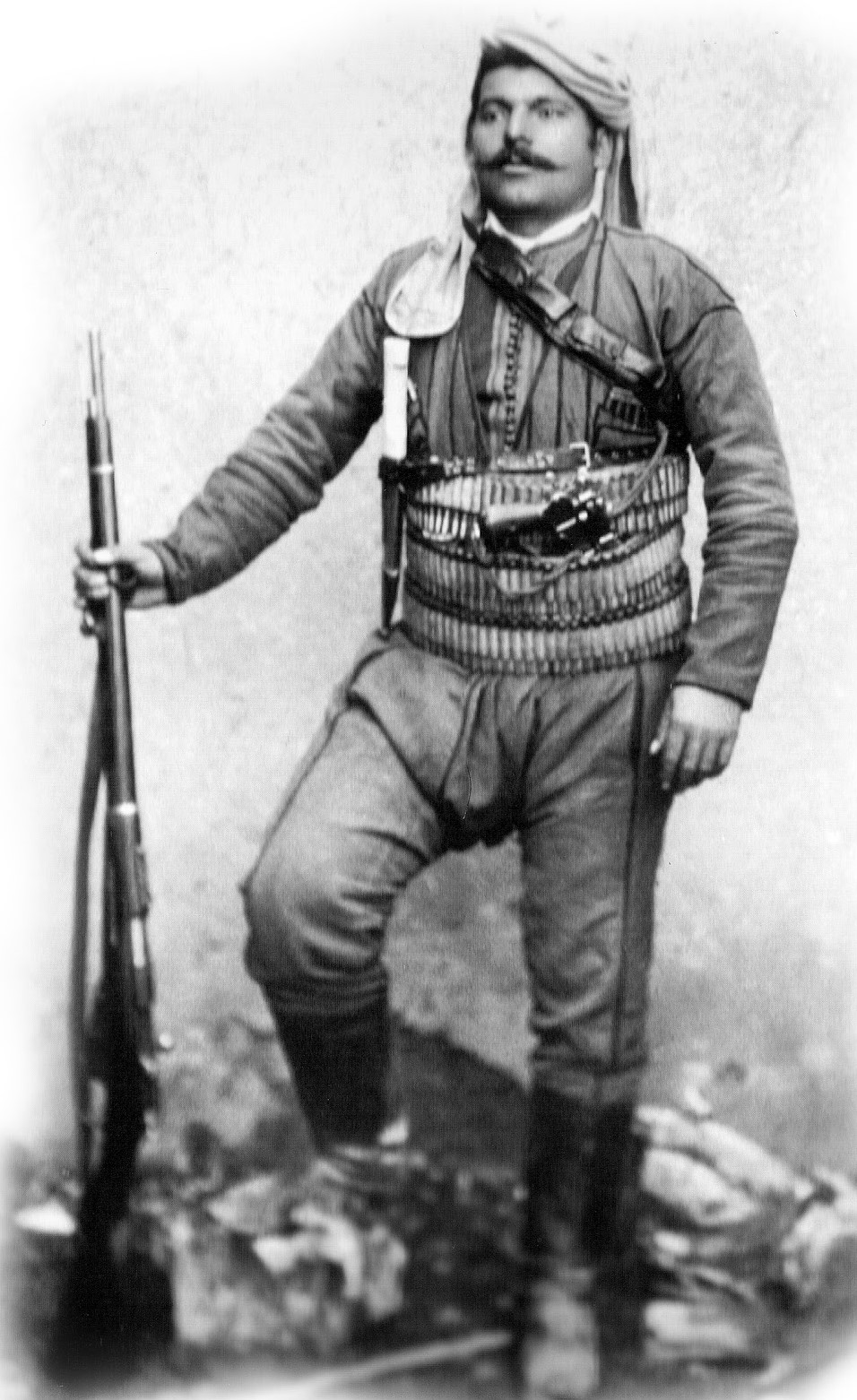
- Battle of Erzincan, 1916
- Born: 1874; Govdun, Sivas Vilayet, Ottoman Empire
- Died: 4 August 1918 (aged 43–44); Baku, Baku Governorate, Azerbaijan
- Military career
- Allegiance: Hunchak; Dashnaktsutyun
- Service years: 1890s—1918
- Nickname: Murad of Sebastia
- Conflicts: Armenian National Liberation Movement; Kum Kapu demonstration Sasun Uprising; World War I: Battle of Kara Killisse (1915); Battle of Erzincan; Battle of Baku †

Murad of Sebastia (Armenian: Սեբաստացի Մուրատ, Sebastatsi Murad; Murad of Sebastia; Murad Khrimian; Murad Hagopian; 1874 — 4 August 1918) was a well-known Armenian fedayee during the Armenian national liberation movement in the Ottoman Empire.

== Biography ==
He was born in the Armenian village of Govdun (Կովտուն), about 20 km east of the town of Sivas (from where he got his nickname, Sebastatsi) to a poor rural family that had recently moved to the village. After working as a shepherd and farm labourer during his childhood, he moved as a teenager to Istanbul, where he worked for meagre earnings as a carrier. He joined the Social Democrat Hunchakian Party and, in the 1890s, participated in Armenian demonstrations protesting against the second-class treatment of Armenians within the Ottoman Empire.

After assassinating an Armenian informer he escaped to Greece and then to Egypt. He then became a member of the Armenian Revolutionary Federation, joined fedayee bands, and participated in guerrilla activities in response to the Hamidian massacres. In 1904 he played a visible role during the Sasun Uprising, and then started to operate in Van. During the Armenian-Tatar massacres 1905-1907, he was designated head of defense of the Zangezur region and, gathering a group of 50 horsemen, he defended the Armenian population of Kapan from massacres. An amnesty following the Young Turk revolution of 1908 allowed Murad to return to the Ottoman Empire, where he worked in Van and in Sivas. In particular, he participated in the organization of a network of schools and charitable and female societies, and taught physical culture and theatrical art at Armenian schools.

== World War I ==
Murad's group of fedayees.

At the beginning of the Armenian genocide in 1915, Murad was at Sivas. After the order of deportation, in March 1915, Turkish gendarmes were sent to arrest Murad on the order of the Vali of Sivas. The Ottoman authorities had promised the Armenian population that they would be excluded from deportations if they handed Murad over. Many Armenians, particularly the elders who did not want to leave their property and home, began to report to the Ottoman authorities about his whereabouts. Escaping capture, Murad and a small band of compatriots took to the hills and engaged in guerilla warfare against Turkish cavalry and infantry units sent to find him. In the autumn of 1915 he moved towards the Black Sea coast at Samsun where, joined by some Greek rebels, he captured a sailboat and escaped to the Russian port of Batum. He then travelled to Tiflis and joined the First Armenian Volunteer Battalion in the Russian forces. When in Tiflis, he gave an account of his adventures, and the fate of the Armenian population of the Sivas vilayet, that appeared in James Bryce's report "The Treatment of Armenians in the Ottoman Empire". He was with the Armenian Volunteer Battalion at the Battle of Erzinjan, and in Erzingan he organised a fund which rescued hundreds of Armenian women and children being held in Turkish and Kurdish households. He was killed leading a charge against Turkish positions during the Battle of Baku on 4 August 1918.

== See also ==
- Hampartsoum Boyadjian
- Andranik Ozanyan
- Arabo
- Yeprem Khan
- Keri
- Aghbiur Serob
- Hrayr Dzhoghk
- Kevork Chavush
