= Frank Lenz (cyclist) =

Missing American cyclist (1867–1894)

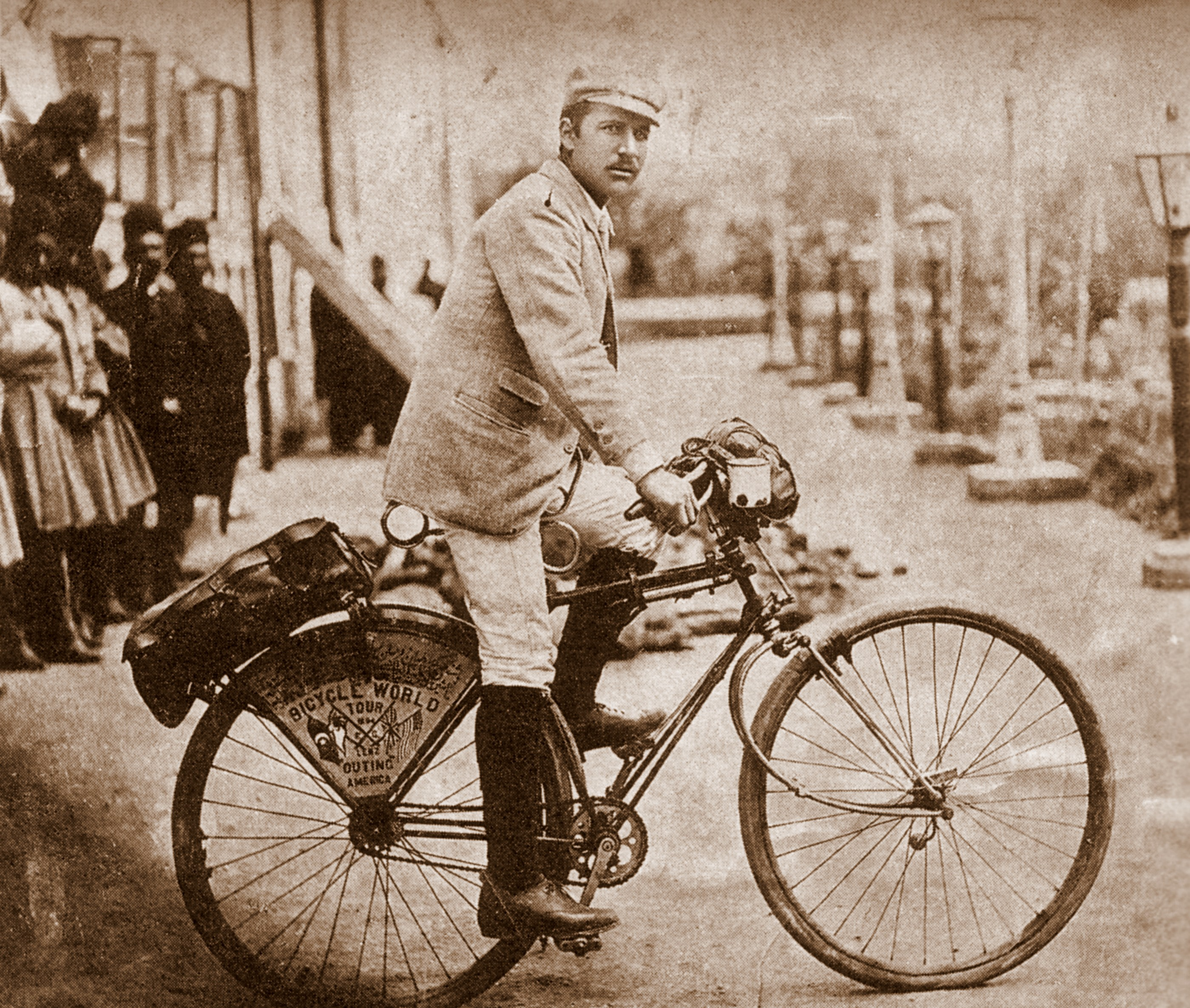
- Born: Frank George Reinhart; February 15, 1867; Philadelphia, Pennsylvania, U.S.
- Disappeared: Erzurum, Ottoman Empire (aged 25)
- Died: May 4, 1894 (aged 27)

Frank George Lenz (born 1867, probably died May 1894) was an American bicyclist and adventurer who disappeared somewhere near Erzurum, Ottoman Empire (now Turkey), in May 1894, during an attempt to circle the globe by bicycle.

== Early life ==
Frank Lenz was born in 1867 in Philadelphia, Pennsylvania, to Adam Reinhart and Anna Maria Reinhart (née Schritz), both immigrants from Malsch, Germany. His father died while Frank was still a child, and Anna Maria moved to Pittsburgh. When Frank was six years old his mother married William Lenz, another German immigrant.

At the age of 17, Lenz took up cycling, joining the Allegheny Cycle Club and exploring the back roads of Pennsylvania. He soon went on longer trips, riding his bike as far as New York City, St. Louis, New Orleans and Chicago. Lenz was also an avid photographer who would bring his camera on his biking trips. He also rode competitively in road races.

== Journey most of the way around the world ==
After English cyclist Thomas Stevens completed the first circumnavigation of the globe by bicycle in 1884–1886, Lenz wanted to make an attempt of his own. He was hired by the magazine Outing (for which Stevens had worked) to publish reports and take photographs from his journey, and set out from the Smithfield Street Bridge in Pittsburgh on a Victory safety bicycle on May 15, 1892, with 800 onlookers wishing him well.

Going first to Washington, D.C., and New York, Lenz traveled west across the United States and parts of Canada, reaching San Francisco on October 20.

From San Francisco he sailed to Japan, where he rode from Yokohama to Nagasaki before crossing to China. While Lenz seems to have had a pleasant trip through Japan, which he praised in his reports, China proved a tougher stage of his journey. Japan had good roads for the time, but roads in China were in poor condition, especially in winter, and the locals were often hostile or fearful. Lenz had expected to cross China in three months, but it took him six, and he was very happy when he reached Burma, then part of the British Empire.

The jungles of Burma proved another difficult obstacle for Lenz, with heavy rain and almost impassable roads, and he also contracted malaria. Reaching Rangoon he found it impossible to ride his bike for the next stage of his journey, and instead crossed by ship to Calcutta. In early October 1893 he left Calcutta, and spent the next month crossing to Lahore. From there he decided to travel south to Karachi, then traveled by steamer to Bushehr in Persia, riding north to Tehran from there. Lenz found Tehran to be a delightful place and was loath to leave, but set out for Tabriz in April 1894, hoping to reach the Ottoman capital of Istanbul before the worst of the summer heat.

In early May 1894, almost two years after his departure from Pittsburgh, Lenz set off from Tabriz on the next stage of his journey, with Erzurum as his next objective. He was never heard from again.

== Search ==
When nothing was heard from Lenz throughout the summer, his family started to worry that something might have happened. The Ottoman Empire was at this time going through a period of turmoil, with the killing of tens of thousands of Armenians taking place in the ongoing Hamidian Massacres. It was difficult to ascertain what might have happened, but Alexander Terrell, the U.S. minister to the Ottoman Empire, felt sure that Lenz had been killed by Kurdish bandits.

Outing eventually sent another famous bicyclist, William Sachtleben, to Erzurum to investigate the circumstances of Lenz's disappearance. Sachtleben had completed his own bike journey around the world in 1892, along with his friend Thomas Allen. He sailed to Europe in March 1895, and traveled to Erzurum, having to forge papers to gain entrance to Ottoman Kurdistan.

In Erzurum, Sachtleben learned from a witness that Lenz entered the Deli Baba Pass and stopped at the village of Kourdali. Allegedly, six Kurds helped Lenz across a river, where they shot him and robbed him.

The Kurdish bandit believed to have killed Lenz was charged and convicted by the Ottoman authorities, but later fled. Some of the Armenian locals who had helped Sachtleben uncover Lenz's fate were also imprisoned, a couple of them dying in prison.

Eventually some eight years after his death, following pressure from the U.S., the Ottoman government agreed to pay a compensation of around $7,500 to Lenz's mother.

== See also ==
- List of people who disappeared
- Pippa Bacca (1974–2008), Italian artist who disappeared in Turkey

== Sources ==
- Koss, Geof. "The Last Ride of Frank Lenz". Adventure Cyclist. January 2009.
- Herlihy, David V. The Lost Cyclist: The Epic Tale of an American Adventurer and His Mysterious Disappearance. Boston: Houghton Mifflin Harcourt, 2010. ISBN 978-0-547-19557-5.
