= Damadian =

Damadian (Armenian: Տամատեան, derived from Turkish "damat", meaning "son-in-law" or "bridegroom") is an Armenian surname. Notable people with the surname include:

- Mihran Damadian (1863–1945), Armenian freedom fighter, political activist, writer, and teacher
- Raymond Damadian (1936–2022), American physician and medical practitioner
