= Girayr =

Armerian militant (1856–1894)

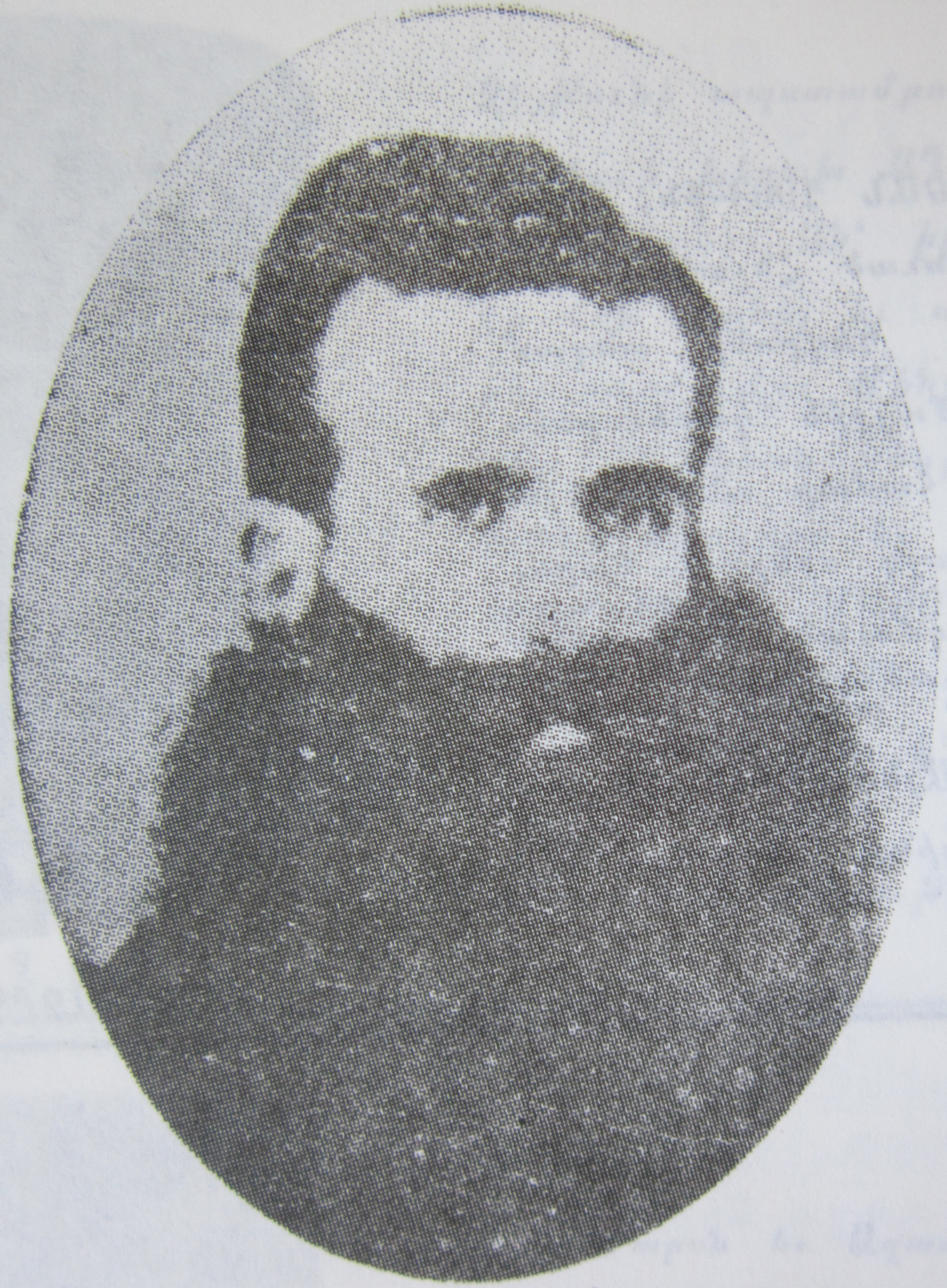
- Born: Harutiun-Mardiros Boyadjian; 1856; Hadjin, Adana Vilayet, Ottoman Empire
- Died: 24 March 1894 (aged 37–38); Yozgat, Ankara Vilayet, Ottoman Empire
- Burial place: none
- Relatives: Medzn Murad (brother), Hayganoush Boyadjian (sister)
- Military career
- Allegiance: Social Democrat Hunchakian Party
- Service years: 1880s—1894
- Nickname: Medzn Girayr (Girayr the Great)
- Conflicts: Armenian National Liberation Movement

Girayr (also spelled Jirair or Zhirair), born Harutiun-Mardiros Boyadjian (Armenian: Ժիրայր, Յարութիւն-Մարտիրոս Պօյաճեան; 1856 – 24 March 1894), was an Armenian fedayi leader and activist of the Social Democrat Hunchakian Party. He was the senior brother of fedayi leader Medzn Murad.

== Biography ==
Boyadjian was born in 1856, in Hadjin in the region of Cilicia. He had a younger brother, Hampartsum (later known as Medzn Murad) and a sister, Haykanush, both of whom also participated in the Armenian national movement. He studied at the Vartanian School in Hadjin and then continued his studies in Constantinople from 1872 to 1874. Afterwards, he returned to Hadjin and worked as a teacher. From 1875 to 1889, he lived in the Russian Empire, where he was exposed to contemporary revolutionary ideas. He returned to Hadjin in 1890 and became director of the school attached to Hadjin's St Toros church. That same year, Girayr and two of his friends founded a local branch of the Social Democrat Hunchakian Party. After Girayr's brother Hampartsum organized the Kum Kapu demonstration in Constantinople, the Turkish authorities decided to arrest him. Girayr fled his hometown and lived and taught in various Armenian communities of the Ottoman Empire, including Dörtyol, Antep, Adana, and Pingian. In 1891, Girayr and his brother Hampartsum were sentenced in absentia to 12- and 10-years imprisonment, respectively, for their revolutionary activities.

Girayr advocated for solidarity between the oppressed people of the Ottoman Empire and established contacts with Kurdish and Turkish revolutionary activists. Girayr founded a fedayee group for his revolutionary activities. Known as "Girayr the Great" (Medzn Girayr), he mainly acted in the regions of Cilicia and Sebastia. In 1892, he edited and distributed papers against Abdul Hamid II's absolutist rule. In October 1893, Girayr ordered Hunchakian activists to organize a demonstration in Yozgat, which ended in violent clashes between the town's Turkish and Armenian populations. In 1894, after the Ottoman authorities arrested 850 innocent Armenians in retaliation for the demonstration, Girayr agreed to surrender himself, after which he was tried and publicly hanged in Yozgat.

Vahram Papazian acted as Girayr in a play written by Hemayag Aramiants in 1908.
