= Hrayr Dzhoghk =

Armenian revolutionary (1864–1904)

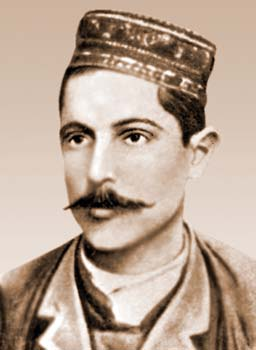
- Born: Armenak Ghazarian; 1864; Aharonk village, Bitlis Vilayet, Ottoman Empire
- Died: 13 April 1904 (aged 39–40) near Geliguzan village, Sasun, Bitlis Vilayet, Ottoman Empire
- Military career
- Allegiance: Dashnaktsutyun
- Service years: late 1880s—1904
- Nickname: Hrayr The Hell
- Conflicts: Armenian National Liberation Movement: Sasun Resistance (1894); Sasun Uprising (1904) †

Hrayr Dzhoghk (Armenian: Հրայր Դժողք, lit. 'Hrayr The Hell'; 1864 – 13 April 1904), born Armenak Ghazarian (Armenian: Արմենակ Ղազարյան), (Note: also known as Hrair, Hrayr, Tjokhk, Djohkh, Dzhokhk) was an Armenian military leader and strategist, fedayee, statesman and teacher, part of the Armenian national liberation movement. He was a member of the Armenian Revolutionary Federation.

== Life ==
He was born as Armenak Ghazarian in Aharonk, a village in the Western Armenian Taron canton of Turuberan province. His father was priest Mamprè Ghazarian. Armenak was graduated from the school of Surb Karapet Monastery in Mush during the late 1880s. Later, he studied at the United Armenian College of Mush. He was deeply influenced by the revolutionary ideas of his teacher Mkrtich Saryan. After his graduation, Armenak has worked as a teacher in the Armenian schools of Sasun and Taron. He always wore the traditional Armenian hat of the people of Mush region.

Hrayr and Dzhoghk were his two pen-names, that he used when he contributed articles to the official organ of the Armenian Revolutionary Federation Droshak. At the beginning of his revolutionary career in 1890, he joined the Hunchakian Party and worked closely with the party leaders Mihran Damadian and Hampartsoum Boyadjian. Shortly after, he left the Hunchakian Party in 1893 for ideological differences.

Dzhoghk joined the Armenian Revolutionary Federation and worked with prominent military leaders Aghbiur Serob, Kevork Chavush and Andranik Ozanian. In spring 1894, Hrayr went to the Caucasus to purchase weapons for the Armenian revolutionaries. Then he went to Romania where he joined the Armenian Revolutionary Federation. He believed in rebellion with the participation of the masses, and was one of the leaders of the Sasun Resistance of 1894.

By 1895, Hrayr returned to Western Armenia with a group of 50 young men among which were Andranik Ozanian and Aghbiur Serob. Together with Tatul (Aram Aramian) he organized defense against slaughter in the area of Basen. In June, 1896 both were arrested and placed in prison of Erzurum; Tatul was hanged, Hrayr released on amnesty. Afterward he went to Van and made plans to organize the Van Defense of 1896, then to Sasun (1902) where Hrayr and Andranik were both the main organizers and heads of the Sasun Resistance of 1904. During this defense, he was killed on 13 April in the village Gelieguzan. He was buried near Serob Pasha in the court of a local church. Hrayr and his comrade's bodies were buried by Andranik's soldiers, who came to help the local population.

== Sources ==
- S. Kirak, Hrair-Dzhoghk, Asbarez daily, Nov. 27, 1981, p. 3
- Dr. A. Chalabian, Gen. Andranik and the Armenian Revolutionary Movement, USA, 1988, pp. 106–107.
