= William Sachtleben =

American journalist, lecturer and touring cyclist

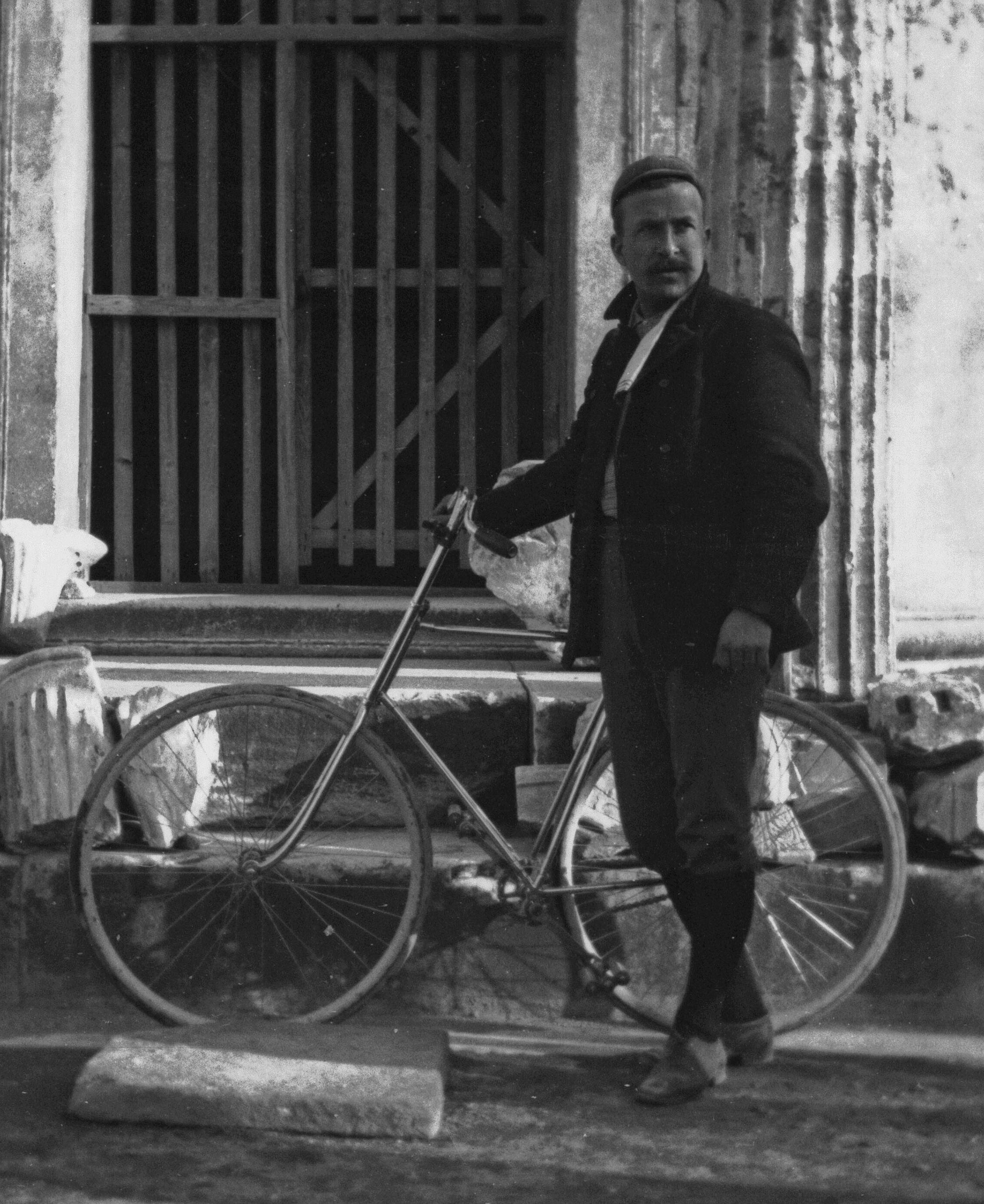
- William Sachtleben at the Tower of the Winds in Athens (1891)
- Born: March 29, 1866; Alton, Illinois
- Died: December 13, 1953 (aged 87); Fort Lauderdale, Florida
- Education: Washington University in St. Louis
- Occupations: journalist, lecturer and cyclist

William Lewis Sachtleben (March 29, 1866 – December 13, 1953) was a 19th-century American journalist and lecturer who was one of the early globe-circling bicyclists, at one time holding a world record for long-distance bicycling.

He was a graduate of Washington University in St. Louis. His attempt in 1895 to rescue, recover, and achieve justice for fellow cyclist Frank Lenz, who had disappeared in Turkey (then in the Ottoman Empire) at the time of the Hamidian Massacres, was seen as akin to the earlier search for David Livingstone in Africa. He later went on to explore for fortune and entered the business world.

== His search ==
William Sachtleben was sent to Erzurum to investigate the circumstances of Lenz' disappearance. Sachtleben had completed his own bike journey around the world in 1892, along with his friend Thomas Allen. He sailed to Europe in March 1895, and traveled to Erzurum, having to forge papers to gain entrance to Ottoman Turkey.

In Erzurum, Sachtleben learned that Lenz had somehow insulted a notorious local Kurdish chief when passing through a small village there. The local Kurds then apparently ambushed and killed him, burying his body on the bank of a river in the forest.

The Kurdish bandit believed to have killed Lenz was charged and convicted by the Turkish authorities, but later fled. Some of the Armenian locals who had helped Sachtleben uncover Lenz' fate were also imprisoned, a couple of them dying in prison.

Eventually some eight years after his death, following pressure from the U.S., the Ottoman government agreed to pay a compensation of around $7,500 to Lenz' mother.

== Bibliography ==
- Allen, Thomas G. and William L. Sachtleben. Across Asia on a Bicycle. New York: The Century Co., 1897.
- Sachtleben, William (March 1, 1895). "To Search for F.G. Lenz". The New York Times.
- Herlihy, David Herlihy. The Lost Cyclist: The Epic Tale of an American Adventurer and His Mysterious Disappearance. Boston: Houghton Mifflin Harcourt, 2010. ISBN 978-0-547-19557-5.
- Across Asia on a Bicycle: The Journey of Two American Students from gives date and place of death.
