= 1904 Sasun uprising =

1904 uprising by Armenian militia against the Ottoman Empire

Coordinates: 38°22′49″N 41°23′43″E

Sasun uprising
- Part of Armenian resistance during the Armenian genocide
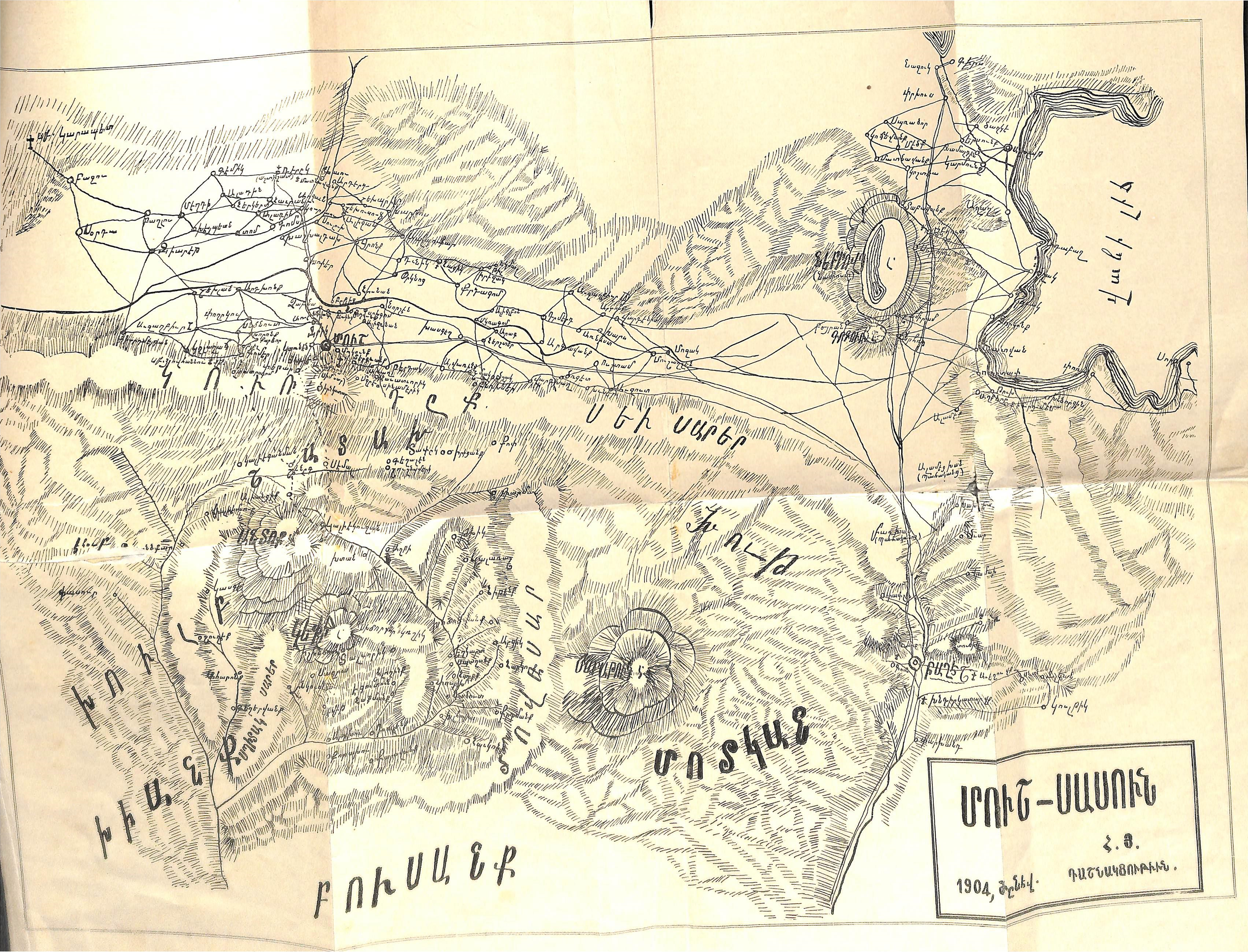
- ARF map of the Sasun-Mush regions where most of the fighting was concentrated. Lake Van on the top right for reference.
Date	March–April 1904
Location	Sason, Bitlis Vilayet, Ottoman Empire
Result	Uprising suppressed

Belligerents
Ottoman Empire	Armenian fedayi

Commanders and leaders
Wāli of Bitlis	Hrayr Dzhoghk †; Andranik Ozanian

Strength
10,000 Ottoman troops, 7,000 Kurds	1,000 Armenian irregular units, 3,000 Armenians from Sasun

Casualties and losses
Unknown	7,000–10,000 Armenian civilians were killed

The Sasun uprising or Sasun rebellion of 1904 (Armenian: Սասունի երկրորդ ապստամբութիւնը, Sasuni yerkrord apstambut'yunĕ, literally Second Sassoun resistance) was an uprising by Armenian militia against the Ottoman Empire in Turkey's Sason region in 1904. The empire wanted to prevent the formation of another semi-autonomous Armenian region in the eastern vilayets after its defeat in the First Zeitun Rebellion. In Sason, the Armenian national liberation movement recruited young Armenians. Upon investigation, a European mission concluded that Armenians were not at fault, but rather acted in self-defense. The mission called for the sultan to enforce the reforms that were previously pledged.

== Background ==
The Social Democrat Hunchakian Party and the Armenian Revolutionary Federation were two elements of the Armenian national movement which were active in the region. The first Sasun resistance was led by the Armenian national movement's militia, which belonged to Hunchak. According to Cyrus Hamlin, the Armenians triggered hostilities. Conflicts continued between the Armenian fedayeen (Armenian irregular forces) and the Muslim Ottomans in Armenian villages. Many Armenians were compelled to accept Islam or Orthodoxy; the latter was protected by the Russian consulate.

In spring 1902 a representative of the Armenian Revolutionary Federation, Vahan Manvelyan, was sent to Sason to negotiate a ceasefire with the Turks, to occupy the area and concentrate forces for a larger revolt to be led by Manvelyan and local activist Hrayr Tjokhk. This consolidation continued during 1902 and 1903. In May 1903, a militia led by Gorgos "Marrik" arrived in Sasun. Vahan and Hrayr considered it too small, and sent a party east with a request for more troops. In September a group of 150 fedayeen, led by Khan and Onik, was sent. At the Persian-Turkish border, it was surrounded by Turkish artillery troops and almost completely destroyed. In February 1903 in Sofia, the Armenian Revolutionary Federation (ARF) agreed to send troops to Sason.

By this time, approaches to Sasun had been blocked by a division of the 4th Corps of the Ottoman army (eight battalions, later increased to fourteen). The total force comprised as many as 10,000 soldiers and policemen, in addition to 6,000–7,000 irregular Kurdish cavalry. Armenian forces consisted of 200 guerrillas under the command of Vahan, Hrayr and Andranik, along with Kevork Chavoush, Murad of Sebastia, Keri and others. Untrained peasants in 21 villages also took up arms, swelling the insurgency to 1,000. Andranik suggested inciting a general revolt in Armenia which would disperse the Turkish forces; Hrayr objected that an Armenian revolt, unsupported by other factions of the Ottoman Empire, would be doomed and suggested concentrating on the defense of Sasun.

== Armed conflicts ==
The first military action was undertaken by Kevork Chavush against local Kurds (Kor Slo) to prevent an attack on five Armenian villages in Kurdish-occupied territory. On January 17, 1904, with groups of Murad Sebastatsi and Seyto he attacked the Kurds, who (with Turkish troops) retreated to Pasrur.

The western ARF and the Catholicos tried to organize diplomatic pressure on Turkey. The Catholicos appealed to the great powers; English and French ambassadors in Constantinople had audiences with the sultan, but the Russian ambassador stood aside. The sultan agreed to send armies for the maintenance of law and order to Sasun. The ambassadors offered to negotiate on the sultan's behalf with the insurgents in Sasun. However, the Russian ambassador delayed; by the time they arrived in Sasun, military action was at fever pitch.

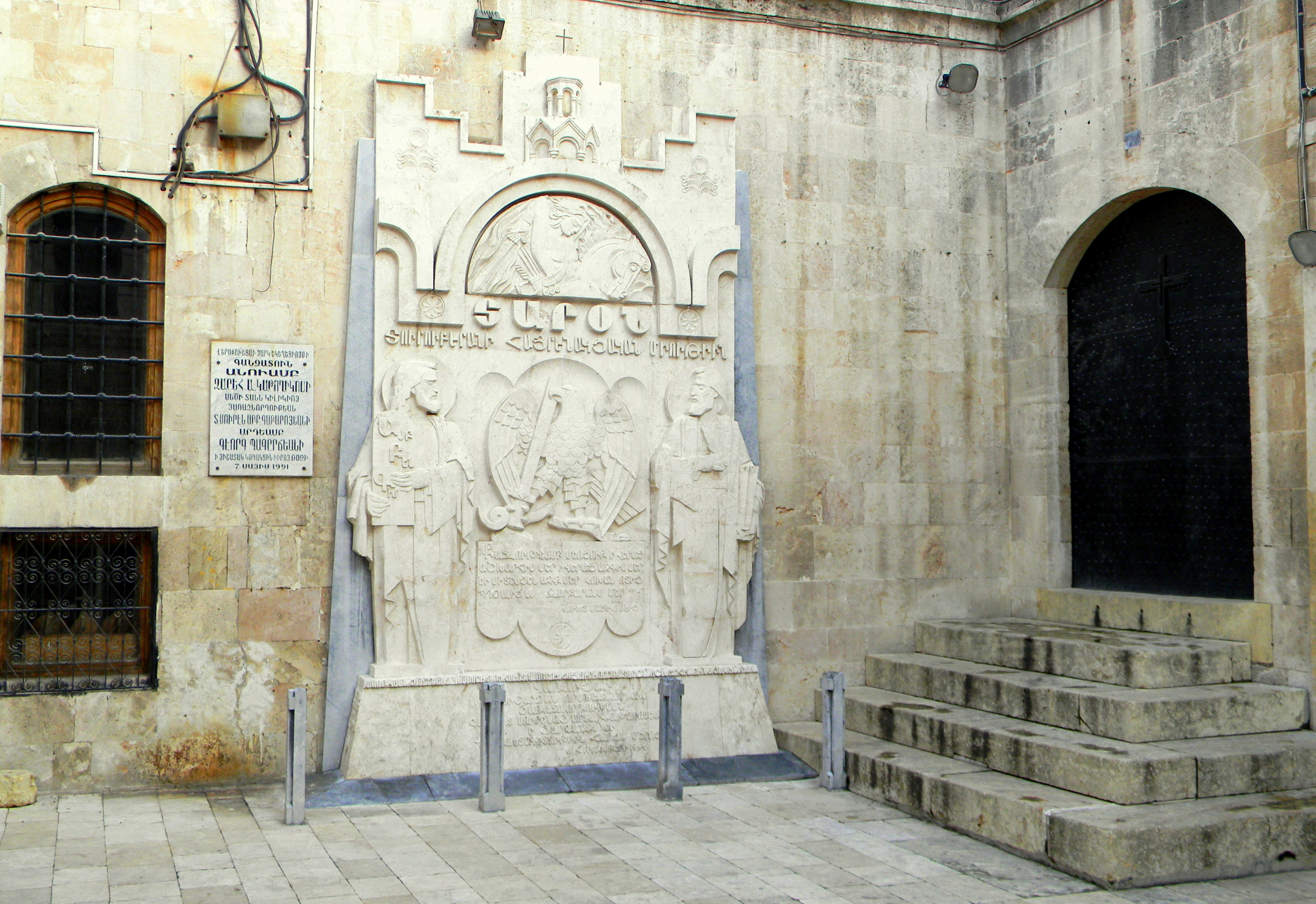
Monument to Sasun resistance at the Cathedral of the Forty Martyrs in Aleppo, Syria

By March 20, 1904, the Turks had finished preparations for addressing the uprising, and armies had plundered a number of boundary villages (which, by order from Hrayr, did not resist). Local residents were imprisoned and tortured, but the Ottomans were unable to learn about the insurgents' plans. The Armenians plan of action was: Hrayr would defend Aliank and Shenik; Andranik, in Tapyk, would impede the Turks advance on Gelieguzan; Kevork Chavush would defend Ishkhanadzor, and Murad of Sebastia, Akop Kotoian and Makar Spagantsi would defend Chayi Glukh.

On April 2 the Turks began an unsuccessful attack with mountain guns. On April 10, the Wāli of Bitlis arrived with troops and the Armenian bishops of Bitlis and Muş. On April 11, the second battle began. About 7,000 Turkish horsemen rode into the village of Shenik; the Armenians closed in on them at the rear, trapping the Turks between Armenian positions in front and on the right and snow-capped mountains at the left. After a four-hour fight the Turks abandoned their horses and weapons and retreated into the mountains, pursued by the Armenians. On April 12, Surb Arakelots monastery prior Arakel presented a decree from the Catholicos recommending that the Armenians surrender in exchange for amnesty. The Armenian leaders, requesting a delay in responding, evacuated and burned several villages in Gelieguzan overnight. At dawn on April 13, the Turks began a new approach.

The defense was split into two groups: one (under Sepukh and Murad of Sebastia) moved towards Brlik, and another (under Hrayr) moved into the mountains. Eight companies of Turks and 4,000 Kurdish horsemen attacked Gelieguzan, and Hrayr was killed at the beginning of the battle. Fierce hand-to-hand fighting began; from the eastern side of the village, Andranik and his troops struck in the Turkish rear. The Turks retreated, sustaining (according to press reports) as many as 136 deaths; the Armenians had seven killed and eight wounded.

On April 14, the Turks unsuccessfully attacked again with reinforcements; by April 16, the residents of Ishkhanadzor had retreated to Talvorik. The Turks tried to cut off their path, but with the help of local troops they broke through. On April 17, a new attack (which also repulsed) was begun. On April 20, the Turks surrounded Gelieduzan with a mass artillery bombardment and fedayeen (led by Andranik) retreated to Talvorik by night. Up to 20,000 people (the population of five evacuated villages) fled—some to the mountains and others to the Mush plain—and were slaughtered. Talvorik held out until May 6, falling to Turkish reinforcements. Two hundred fedayeen between Таlvorik and Gelieguzan resisted until May 14 before retreating. The Turkish victory was accompanied by brutality:

Women have been stolen, their breasts cut off, their stomachs ripped, children impaled, old men dismembered. Young girls withdrew in uncountable set ... since May 5th, Turkish armies have wiped out one village after another in Berdakh, Mkragom, Alikrpo, Avazakhiubr and Arnist.

According to estimates, from 3,000 to 8,000 people were killed and 45 villages destroyed. To hide traces of genocide from European observers, the Wāli of Bitlis gave orders to cut corpses into pieces and throw them into the Tigris.

== Aftermath ==
The sultan decreed that Armenians were forbidden to return to Sasun; after diplomatic protests he relented, and 6,000 Armenians returned to the region.

== See also ==
- Social Democrat Hunchakian Party
- Armenian Revolutionary Federation

== Sources ==
- Kurdoghlian, Mihran (1996). Hayots Badmoutioun, Volume III (in Armenian). Athens, Greece: Hradaragoutioun Azkayin Ousoumnagan Khorhourti. p. 47.
- Эдуард Оганесян. Век борьбы. Москва-Мюнхен, т.1., 1991, стр. 221–231.
