= Balabekh Karapet =

Casualty of the Armenian genocide

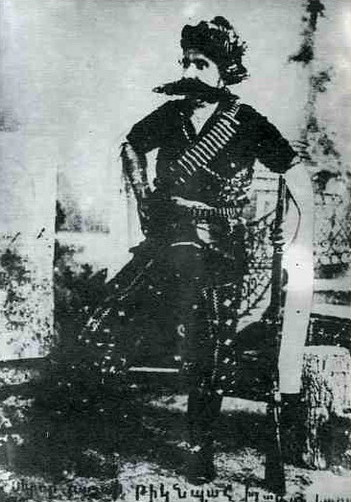

Balabekh Karapet (Armenian: Բալաբեխ Կարապետ [Big Mustache Karapet]; 1878 in Ahlat - 1915 in Bitlis) was an Armenian fedayi in Western Armenia and a member of Dashnaks (Dashnaktsutyun) and the bodyguard of Aghbiur Serob. He was arrested and executed during the eve of the Armenian genocide.
