= Tuman Tumyan =

Armenian revolutionary

- Born: 1879; Shusha, Elisabethpol Governorate, Russian Empire
- Died: 1906 (aged 26–27)
- Military career
- Conflicts: Armenian National Liberation Movement

Tuman Tumyan (Armenian: Թուման Թումյան; 1879–1906) was an active participant of the Armenian national liberation movement.

Tuman Tumyan was born in 1879 in Shusha, Russian Empire and had his local education there; one of his classmates was famed revolutionary Garegin Nzhdeh. Tumanian became known throughout Karabakh when he began publishing the Kokon newspaper in Shushi. He was instrumental in the engagement of gathering volunteer troops in Western Armenia. Under the command of Torgom, the "Hunter" group reached a spring near the Armenian village of Zardanis. The tired warriors, who had walked all night, immediately fell asleep near the spring. The armored warriors even put aside their armored loads. The Russian border guards who came to the water saw them and reported to their commander, who mobilized the military unit.The group was instructed not to shoot at the Russians. Then the Turkish soldiers appeared, who had been informed by the Russian border guards. Torgom twice sent a representative to the Russian commander with a proposal to surrender, but without success. The Russians did not receive the representatives, sent a guard, and the fire died down even more. The commander of the border troops, Colonel Bykov, also arrived, who was later terrorized by the Armenian avenger Hamo Janpoladyan. On the same day, on the afternoon of July 2, Torgom tried to realize his last chance: “The commander, taking the flag with 10-12 comrades, went to the Russian troops under a hail of bullets to surrender. The Russians, leaving them quite close, opened fire at once and rolled 10 souls into the river, including the precious Torgom, holding the Dashnaktsutyun flag in his hand.”[4] Of the 61 fighters of the “Hunter” group, 27 were killed, 6 were wounded, 14 were captured, and the rest escaped. Poet Avetik Isahakian dedicated his famous song "Vorskan Akhper" to Tumian.
