= Kum Kapu demonstration =

Constantinople's Manifestation

- Date: July 27, 1890
- Location: Constantinople
- Methods: Demonstrations

Parties
Hnchak Party	(Ottoman Empire) Ottoman policemen

Lead figures
Medzn Mourad; Mihran Damadian	Sultan Abdul Hamid II

Casualties and losses
3 protesters	4 policemen

The Kum Kapu demonstration occurred in the Kumkapı district of Constantinople on July 27, 1890. It ensued in skirmishing in which several demonstrators and four police officers were killed. The intent of the demonstration was "..to awaken the maltreated Armenians and to make the Sublime Porte fully aware of the miseries of the Armenians."

== Background ==
Towards the close of the nineteenth century, Armenian revolutionary societies began to agitate for reform and renewed European attention to the Armenian Question. The Hnchak party in particular utilized the tactic of mass demonstration to hasten the process. They had been suspected to be behind an earlier June 1890 protest in Erzerum that resulted in a massacre.

== July 27, 1890 ==
On 27 July 1890, Harutiun Jangülian, Mihran Damadian and Hambartsum Boyajian interrupted the Divine Liturgy at the Armenian Cathedral in Constantinople to read a manifesto and denounce the indifference of the Armenian patriarch and Armenian National Assembly.

They soon forced the patriarch to join a procession heading to Yıldız Palace to demand implementation of Article 61 of the 1878 Treaty of Berlin. Even as the procession was gathering, police surrounded the crowd, and shots were fired that resulted in a number of deaths, including four policemen and three protestors. NB Evidence for this paragraph is not provided by the source cited which does report that the deaths listed occurred during the riot at the cathedral.

== Result ==
The Hunchaks concluded that the demonstrations at Kum Kapu were unsuccessful. At the same time, while there was no clear result from the event, the Hunchak press praised the courage shown by those present. Similar demonstrations on a lesser scale followed throughout most of the 1890s.

== See also ==
- Bab Ali demonstration
