= Hamidian massacres =

1894–1897 massacres of Armenians and Assyrians in the Ottoman Empire

- Part of the late Ottoman genocides
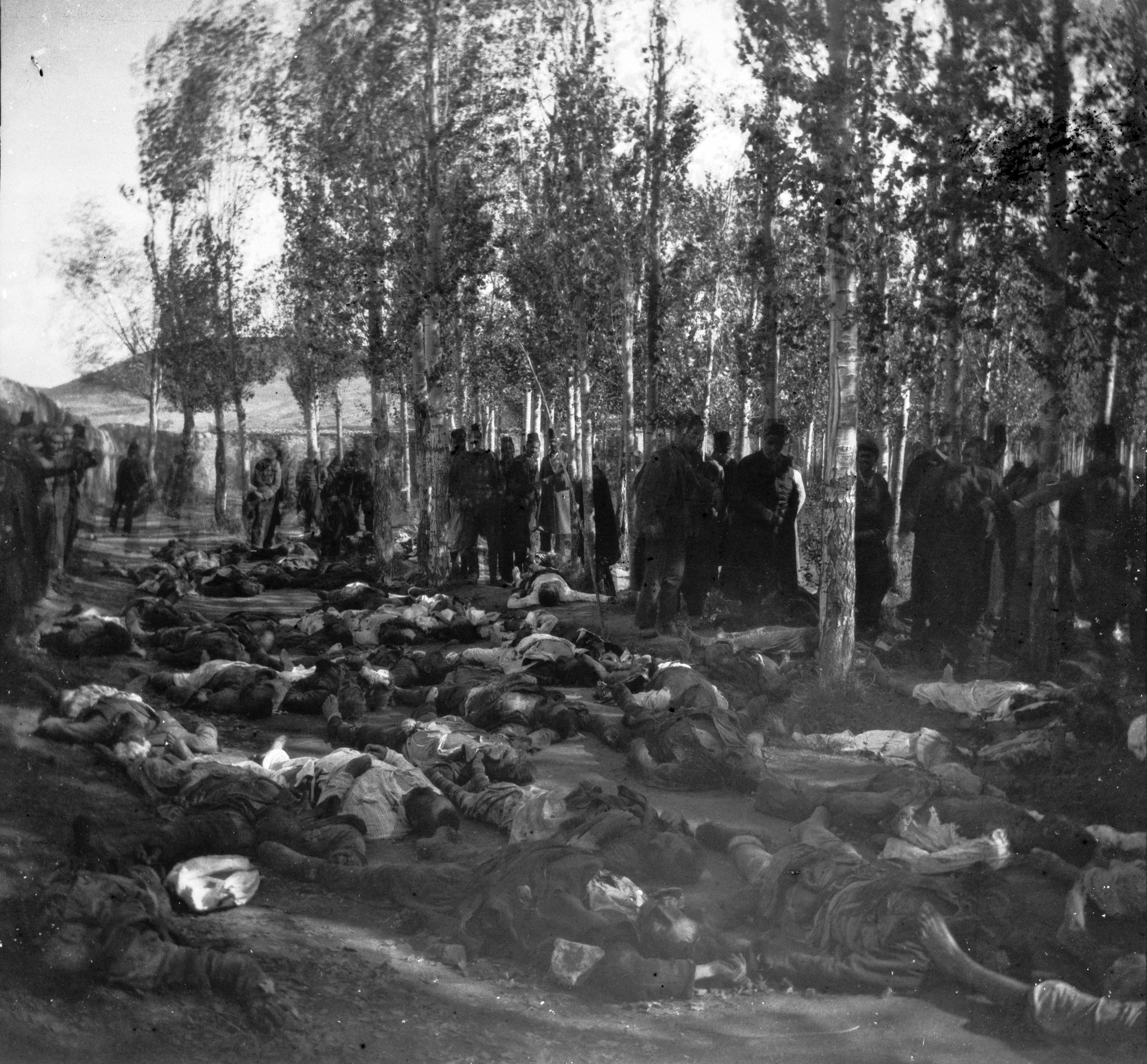
- A photograph taken in November 1895 by William Sachtleben of Armenians killed in Erzurum
- Location: Ottoman Empire
- Date: 1894–1897
- Target: Armenians, Assyrians
- Attack type: Genocide, mass murder, looting, forced conversion, ethnic cleansing, pogrom
- Deaths: 80,000–300,000
- Perpetrator: Government of Sultan Abdul Hamid II,
- Assailants: Ottoman Army; Kurdish mounted cavalry and irregulars, Turkish Muslim mobs
- Motive: Anti-Armenian sentiment, anti-Assyrian sentiment, anti-Christian sentiment, Turkish nationalism, Turkification

Ottoman-Circassian soldiers

The Hamidian massacres, also called the Armenian massacres, were massacres of Armenians in the Ottoman Empire in the mid-1890s. Estimated casualties ranged from 100,000 to 300,000, resulting in 50,000 orphaned children. The massacres were named after Sultan Abdul Hamid II, who, in his efforts to maintain the imperial domain of the declining Ottoman Empire, reasserted pan-Islamism as a state ideology. Although the massacres were aimed mainly at the Armenians, in some cases they turned into indiscriminate anti-Christian pogroms, including the Diyarbekir massacres, where, at least according to one contemporary source, up to 25,000 Assyrians were also killed.

The massacres began in the Ottoman interior in 1894, before they became more widespread in the following years. The majority of the murders took place between 1894 and 1896. The massacres began to taper off in 1897, following international condemnation of Abdul Hamid II. The harshest measures were directed against the long-persecuted Armenian community as its calls for civil reform and better treatment were ignored by the government. The Ottomans made no allowances for the victims on account of their age or gender.

The telegraph spread news of the massacres around the world, leading to a significant amount of coverage of them in the media of Western Europe, Russia and North America.

== Background ==
The origins of the hostility towards the Armenians lay in the increasingly precarious position in which the Ottoman Empire found itself in the last quarter of the 19th century. The end of Ottoman domination of the Balkans was ushered in by an era of European nationalism and an insistence on self-determination by the inhabitants of many territories which had long been ruled by the Ottomans. The Armenians of the empire, who were always considered second-class citizens, had begun to ask for civil reforms and better treatment by the government in the mid-1860s and early 1870s. They pressed for an end to the usurpation of their land, "the looting and murder in Armenian towns by Kurds and Circassians, improprieties during tax collection, criminal behavior by government officials and the refusal to accept Christians as witnesses in trial." These requests went unheeded by the central government. When a nascent form of nationalism spread among the Armenians of Anatolia, including demands for equal rights and a push for autonomy, the Ottoman leadership believed that the empire's Islamic character and even its very existence were threatened.

The chief dragoman (Turkish interpreter) of the British embassy wrote that the reason the Ottomans committed these atrocities was because they were "guided in their general action by the prescriptions of Sheri [Sharia] Law. That law prescribes that if the 'rayah' [subject] Christian attempts, by having recourse to foreign powers, to overstep the limits of privileges allowed to them by their Mussulman masters, and free themselves from their bondage, their lives and property are to be forfeited, and are at the mercy of the Mussulmans. To the Turkish mind, the Armenians had tried to overstep these limits by appealing to foreign powers, especially England. They, therefore, considered it their religious duty and a righteous thing to destroy and seize the lives and property of the Armenians."

=== Armenian Question ===
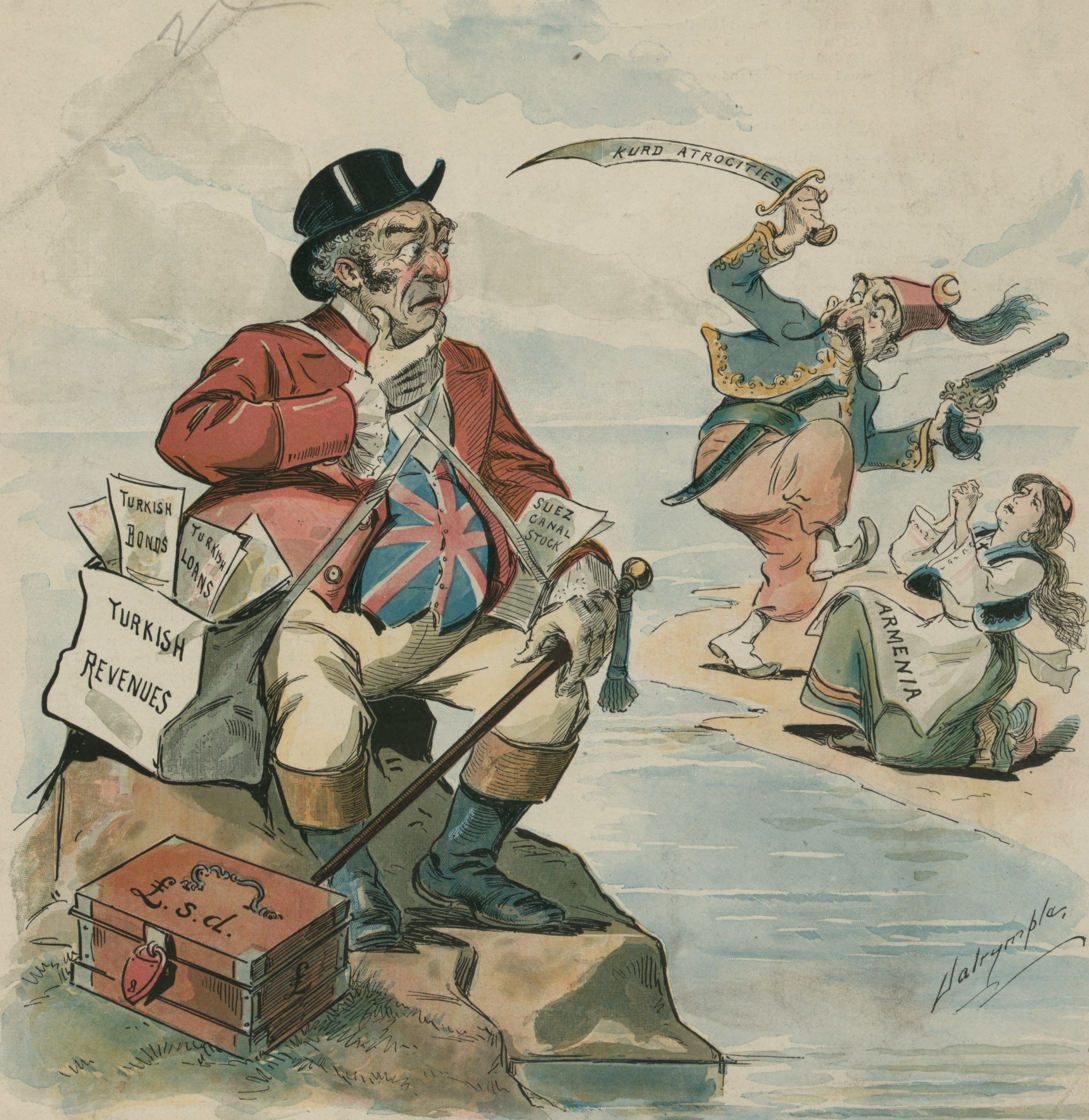
"John Bull's dilemma": "It's 'ard to 'ave to disturb 'im–'e's such a good customer!" Puck, 1895

The combination of Russian military success in the recent Russo-Turkish War, the clear weakening of the Turkish Empire in various spheres including financial spheres (from 1873, the Ottoman Empire suffered greatly from the Panic of 1873), territorial (mentioned above), and the hope among some Armenians that one day all of the Armenian territory might be ruled by Russia, led to a new restiveness among Armenians who were living inside the Ottoman Empire. The Armenians sent a delegation which was led by Mkrtich Khrimian to the 1878 Congress of Berlin to lobby the European powers to include proper safeguards for their kinsmen in the eventual peace agreement.

But the sultan was not prepared to relinquish any of his power. Abdul Hamid believed that the woes of the Ottoman Empire stemmed from "the endless persecutions and hostilities of the Christian world."

He perceived that the Ottoman Armenians were an extension of foreign hostility, a means by which Europe could "get at our most vital places and tear out our very guts." Turkish historian and Abdul Hamid biographer Osman Nuri observed, "The mere mention of the word 'reform' irritated him [Abdul Hamid], inciting his criminal instincts." Upon hearing of the Armenian delegation's visit to Berlin in 1878, he bitterly remarked, "Such great impudence ... Such great treachery toward religion and state ... May they be cursed upon by God."

While he admitted that some of their complaints were well-founded, he likened the Armenians to "hired female mourners [pleureuses] who simulate a pain which they do not feel; they are an effeminate and cowardly people who hide behind the clothes of the great powers and raise an outcry for the smallest of causes."

=== The Hamidiye ===
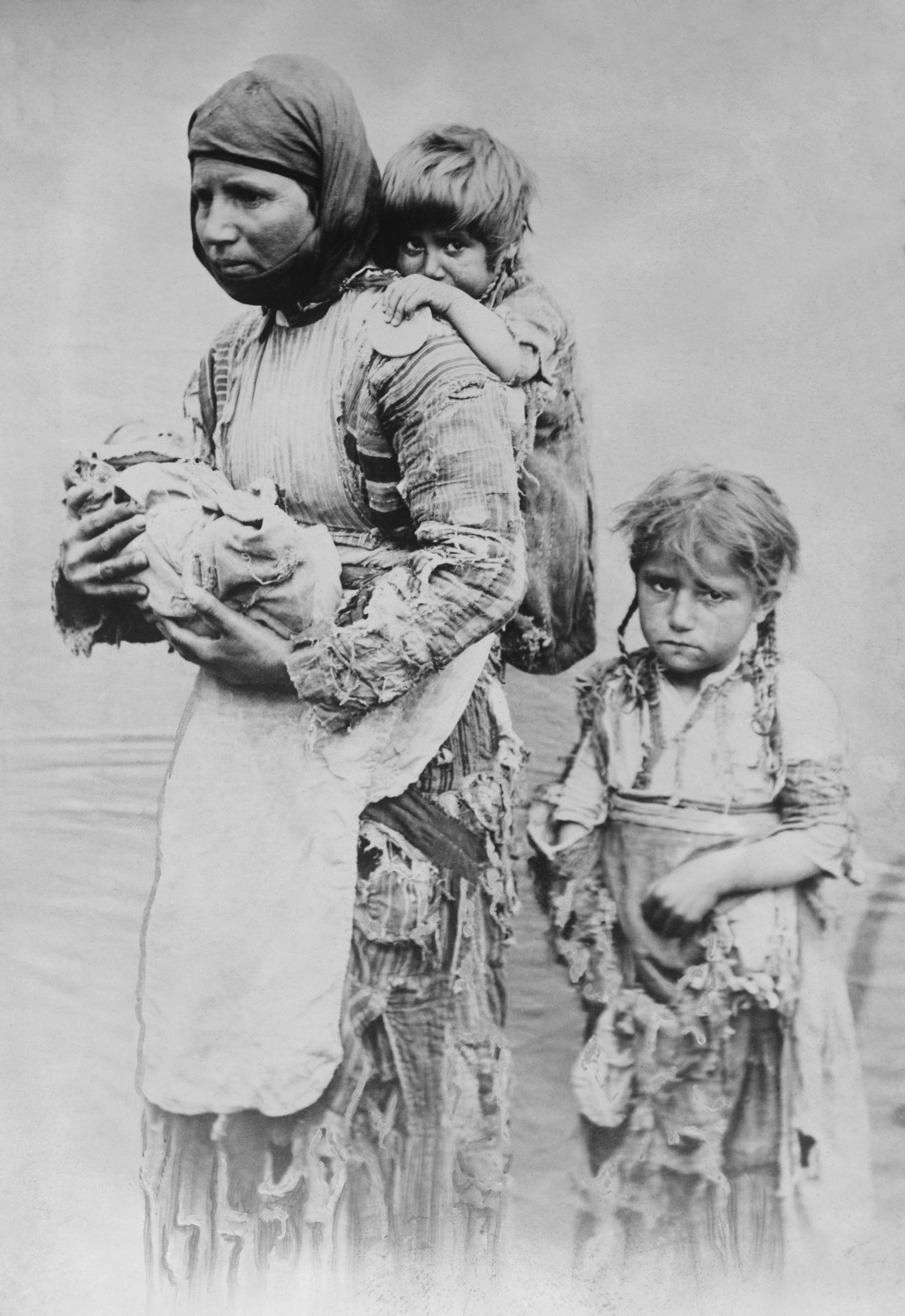
An Armenian woman and her children who were refugees of the massacres and sought help from missionaries by walking great distances.

The provisions for reform in the Armenian provinces embodied in Article 61 of the Treaty of Berlin (1878) were ultimately not enforced and were followed instead by further repression. On January 2, 1881, collective notes sent by the European powers reminding the sultan of the promises of reform failed to prod him into action. The eastern provinces of the Ottoman Empire were historically insecure; the Kurdish rebels attacked the inhabitants of towns and villages with impunity.

In 1890–91, at a time when the empire was either too weak and disorganized or reluctant to halt them, Sultan Abdul Hamid gave semi-official status to the Kurdish bandits. Made up mainly of Kurdish tribes, but also of Turks, Yörüks, Arabs, Turkmens and Circassians, and armed by the state, they came to be called the Hamidiye Alaylari ("Hamidian Regiments"). The Hamidiye and Kurdish brigands were given free rein to attack Armenians, confiscating stores of grain, foodstuffs, and driving off livestock, confident of escaping punishment as they were subjects of military courts only.

Armenians established revolutionary organizations, namely the Social Democrat Hunchakian Party (Hunchak; founded in Switzerland in 1887) and the Armenian Revolutionary Federation (the ARF or Dashnaktsutiun, founded in 1890 in Tiflis). Clashes ensued and unrest occurred in 1892 at Merzifon and in 1893 at Tokat.

=== Disturbances in Sasun ===
In 1894 the sultan began to target the Armenian people in a precursor to the Hamidian massacres. This persecution strengthened nationalistic sentiment among Armenians. The first notable battle in the Armenian resistance took place in Sasun. Hunchak activists, such as Mihran Damadian, Hampartsoum Boyadjian, and Hrayr Dzhoghk, encouraged resistance against double taxation and Ottoman persecution. The ARF armed the people of the region. The Armenians confronted the Ottoman army and Kurdish irregulars at Sasun, finally succumbing to superior numbers and to Turkish assurances of amnesty, which never materialized.

In response to the resistance at Sasun, the governor of Mush responded by inciting the local Muslims against the Armenians. Historian Lord Kinross wrote that massacres of this kind were often achieved by gathering Muslims in a local mosque and claiming the Armenians had the aim of "striking at Islam".

Sultan Abdul Hamid sent the Ottoman army into the area and also armed groups of Kurdish irregulars. The violence spread and affected most of the Armenian towns in the Ottoman Empire.

== Massacres ==
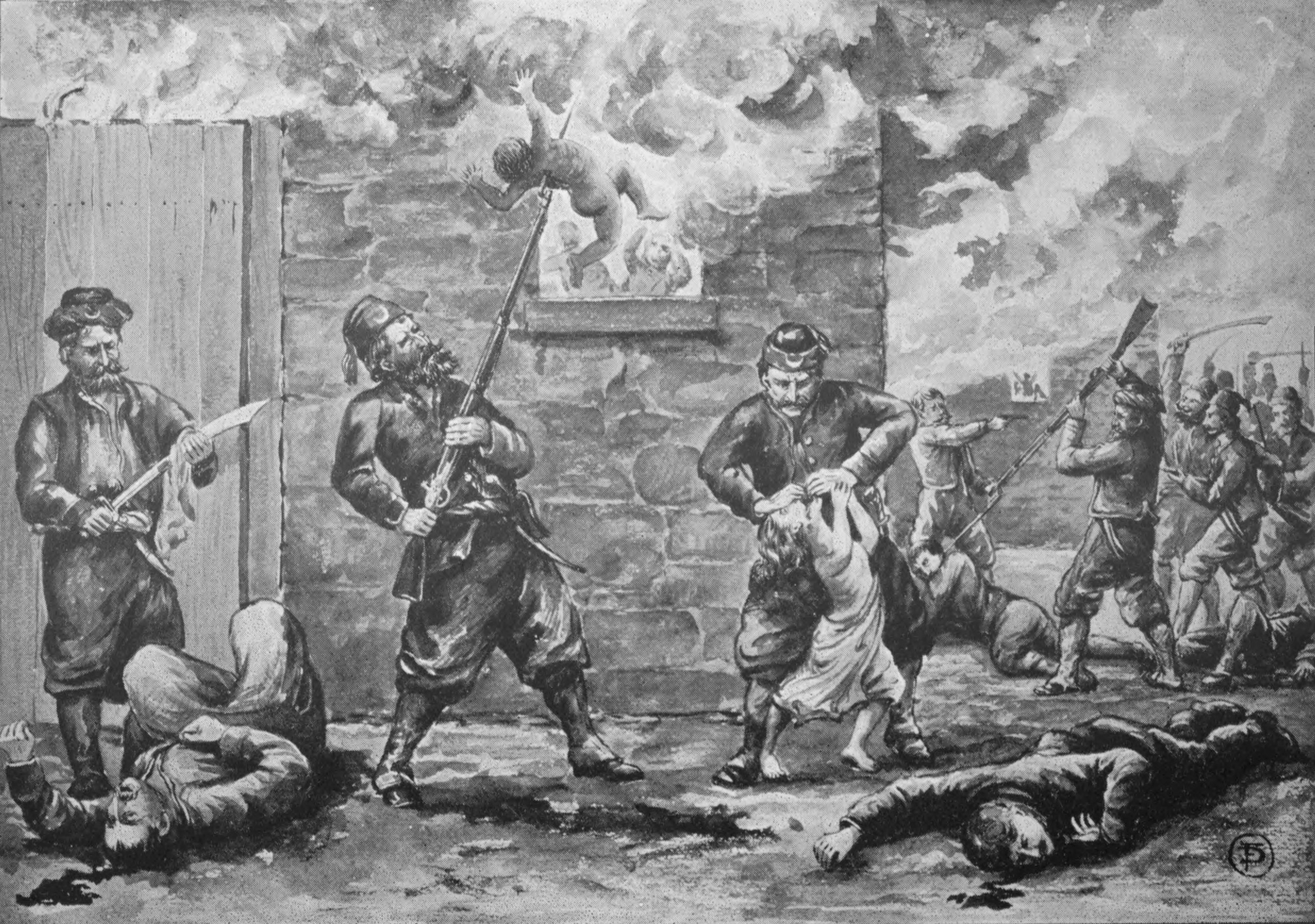
An 1896 depiction of fanatical "Softas" massacring Armenians.

The Great Powers (Britain, France, Russia) forced Hamid to sign a new reform package designed to curtail the powers of the Hamidiye in October 1895 which, like the Berlin treaty, was never implemented. On October 1, 1895, two thousand Armenians assembled in Constantinople (now Istanbul) to petition for the implementation of the reforms, but Ottoman police units converged on the rally and violently broke it up. Upon receiving the reform package, the sultan is said to have remarked, "This business will end in blood."

Soon massacres of Armenians broke out in Constantinople and then engulfed the rest of the Armenian-populated vilayets of Bitlis, Diyarbekir, Erzurum, Mamuret-ul-Aziz, Sivas, Trebizond and Van. Thousands were killed at the hands of their Muslim neighbours and government soldiers, and many more died during the cold winter of 1895–96. William Sachtleben, an American journalist who happened to be in Erzurum after the massacre there in 1895, recounted the grisly scene he came across in a lengthy letter to The Times:

What I myself saw this Friday afternoon [November 1] is forever engraven on my mind as the most horrible sight a man can see. I went with one of the cavasses of the English Legation, a soldier, my interpreter, and a photographer (Armenian) to the Gregorian [i.e., Armenian Apostolic] Cemetery ....Along the wall on the north, in a row 20 ft (6 m) wide and 150 ft (46 m) long, lay 321 dead bodies of the massacred Armenians. Many were fearfully mangled and mutilated. I saw one with his face completely smashed in with a blow of some heavy weapon after he was killed. I saw some with their own necks almost severed by a sword cut. One I saw whose whole chest had been skinned, his fore-arms were cut off, while the upper arm was skinned of flesh. I asked if the dogs had done this. "No, the Turks did it with their knives." A dozen bodies were half burned. All the corpses had been rifled of all their clothes except a cotton undergarment or two....To be killed in battle by brave men is one thing; to be butchered by cowardly armed soldiers in cold blood and utterly defenseless is another thing.

The French vice consul of Diyarbakır, Gustave Meyrier, recounted to Ambassador Paul Cambon stories of Armenian women and children being assaulted and killed and described the attackers "as cowardly as they were cruel. They refused to attack where people defended themselves and instead concentrated on defenseless districts." The worst atrocity took place in Urfa, where Ottoman troops burned the Armenian cathedral, in which 3,000 Armenians had taken refuge, and shot at anyone who tried to escape.

Abdul Hamid's private first secretary wrote in his memoirs about Abdul Hamid that he "decided to pursue a policy of severity and terror against the Armenians, and in order to succeed in this respect he elected the method of dealing them an economic blow... he ordered that they absolutely avoid negotiating or discussing anything with the Armenians and that they inflict upon them a decisive strike to settle scores."

The killings continued until 1897. In that last year, Sultan Hamid declared the Armenian Question closed. Many Armenian revolutionaries had either been killed or escaped to Russia. The Ottoman government closed Armenian societies and restricted Armenian political movements.

Some non-Armenian groups were also attacked during the massacres. The French diplomatic correspondence shows that the Hamidiye carried out massacres not only of Armenians but also of Assyrians living in Diyarbakir, Hasankeyf, Sivas and other parts of Anatolia.

A letter sent by an Ottoman soldier to his brother and parents on November 23, 1895, says:

My brother, if you want news from here we have killed 1,200 Armenians, all of them as food for the dogs... Mother, I am safe and sound. Father, 20 days ago we made war on the Armenian unbelievers. Through God's grace no harm befell us... .There is a rumour afoot that our Battalion will be ordered to your part of the world—if so, we will kill all the Armenians there. Besides, 511 Armenians were wounded, one or two perish every day. If you ask after the soldiers and Bashi Bozouks [wild irregulars], not one of their noses has bled... May God bless you....

Another letter from December 23, 1895, says:

I killed [the Armenians] like dogs... .If you ask news in this manner, we slew 2,500 Armenians and looted their goods

== Death toll ==
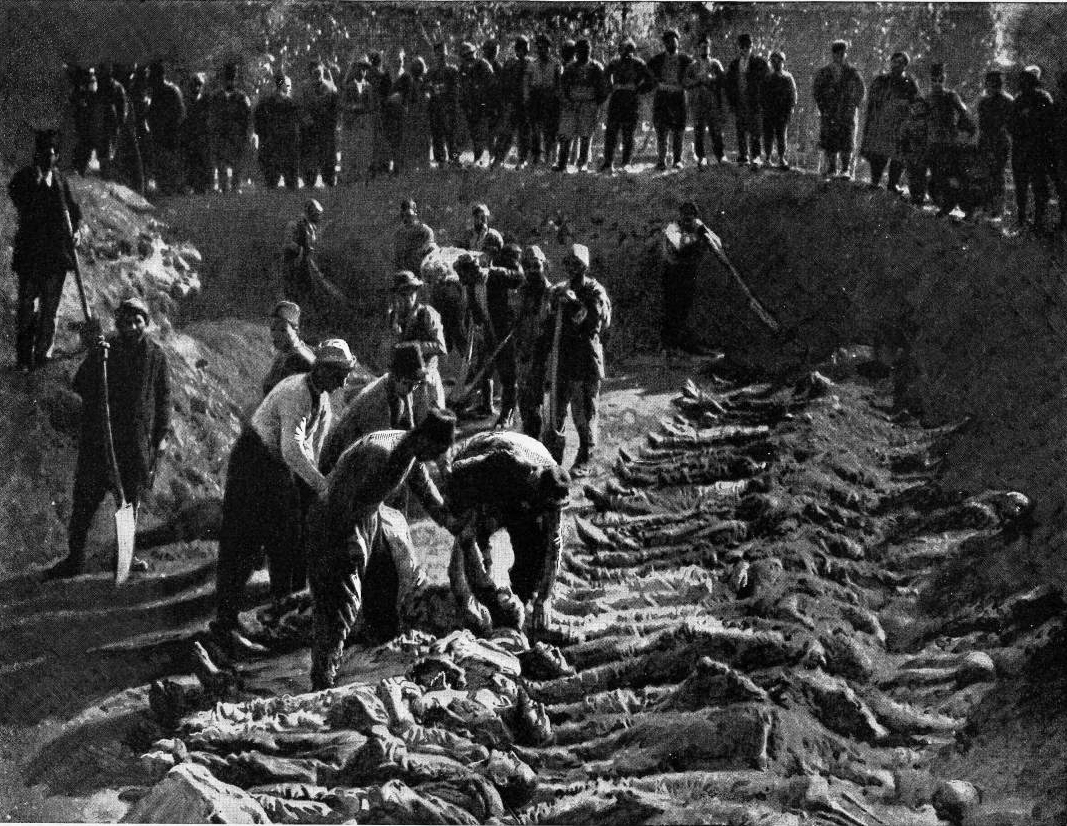
Armenian victims of the massacres being buried in a mass grave at Erzerum cemetery.

It is impossible to ascertain how many Armenians were killed, although the figures cited by historians have ranged from 80,000 to 300,000.

The German pastor Johannes Lepsius meticulously collected data on the destruction and in his calculations, counted the deaths of 88,243 Armenians, the destitution of 546,000, the destruction of 2,493 villages, the residents of 646 of which were forcibly converted to Islam, and the desecration of 645 churches and monasteries, of which 328 were converted into mosques. He also estimated the additional deaths of 100,000 Armenians due to famine and disease totalling a number of approximately 200,000.

In contrast the ambassador of Britain estimated 100,000 were killed up until early December 1895. However, the period of massacres spread well into 1896. German foreign ministry operative and Turkologist Ernst Jäckh claimed that 200,000 Armenians were killed and 50,000 were expelled and a million pillaged and plundered. A similar figure is cited by the French diplomatic historian Pierre Renouvin who claimed that 250,000 Armenians died based on authenticated documents while serving his duty.

Besides Armenians, some 25,000 Assyrians also lost their lives during the Diyarbekir massacres. Muslims were warned to not attack Greeks, but a few of them were killed anyways because they were mistaken for Armenians.

== Conversions ==
In addition to the death toll many Armenians converted to Islam in an attempt to escape the violence. While Ottoman officials claimed that these conversions were voluntary, modern scholars, including Selim Deringil, have argued that the conversions were either directly forced or acts of desperation. Deringil notes that many Armenian men shifted swiftly from Christianity to Islam, seeking out circumcision and becoming prominent attendees of their local mosques, attending prayer multiple times each day. Women converted as well, and many chose to remain within Islam even after the violence ended – some Armenian women who were tracked down following the violence indicated that they preferred to remain with their Muslim husbands, many of whom had captured them during the raids and violence, rather than return and face shame within their communities.

== International reaction ==
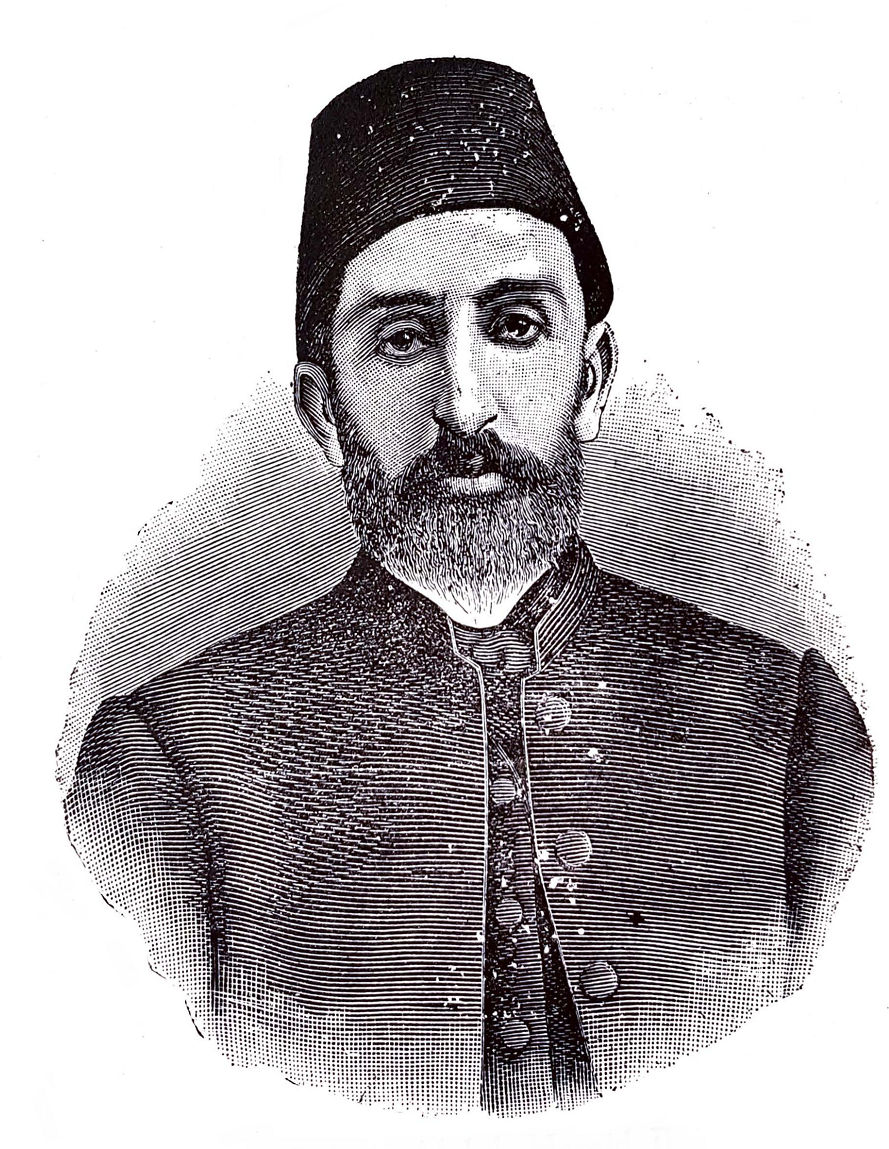
Sultan Abdul Hamid II

News of the Armenian massacres in the empire were widely reported in Europe and the United States and drew strong responses from foreign governments, humanitarian organizations, and the press alike. British print and illustrated newspapers regularly covered the massacres, with the popular weekly Punch publishing dozens of cartoons depicting the carnage. Further, historian Leslie Rogne Schumacher notes that the massacres "reflected and impacted the changing world of European international relations" in the years before the First World War, weakening Britain's relationship with the Ottoman Empire and bolstering British ties to Russia.

The French ambassador described Turkey as "literally in flames", with "massacres everywhere" and all Christians being murdered "without distinction." A French vice consul declared that the Ottoman Empire was "gradually annihilating the Christian element" by "giving the Kurdish chieftains carte blanche to do whatever they please, to enrich themselves at the Christians' expense and to satisfy their men's whims."

One headline in a September 1895 article by The New York Times ran "Armenian Holocaust", while the Catholic World declared, "Not all the perfume of Arabia can wash the hand of Turkey clean enough to be suffered any longer to hold the reins of power over one inch of Christian territory." The rest of the American press called for action to help the Armenians and to remove, "if not by political action then by resort to the knife... the fever spot of the Turkish Empire." King Leopold II of Belgium told British Prime Minister Salisbury that he was prepared to send his Congolese Force Publique to "invade and occupy" Armenia. The massacres were an important item on the agenda of the United States President Grover Cleveland, and in his presidential platform for 1896, Republican candidate William McKinley listed the saving of the Armenians as one of his top priorities in foreign policy. Americans in the Ottoman Empire, such as George Washburn, then-president of the Constantinople-based Robert College, pressured their government to take concrete action. In December 1900, the battleship USS Kentucky called at the port of Smyrna, where its captain, "Red Bill" Kirkland, delivered the following warning, somewhat softened by his translator, to its governor: "If these massacres continue I'll be swuzzled if I won't someday forget my order… and find some pretext to hammer a few Turkish towns… I'd keel-haul every blithering mother's son of a Turk that wears hair." Americans on the mainland, such as Julia Ward Howe, David Josiah Brewer, and John D. Rockefeller, donated and raised large amounts of money and organized relief aid that was channeled to the Armenians via the newly established American Red Cross. Other humanitarian groups and the Red Cross helped by sending aid to the remaining survivors who were dying of disease and hunger. In Greece, thousands of Armenian refugees sought asylum and were temporarily settled in Athens and Piraeus. Prime Minister Theodoros Deligiannis was reported as showing "paternal affection" for them.

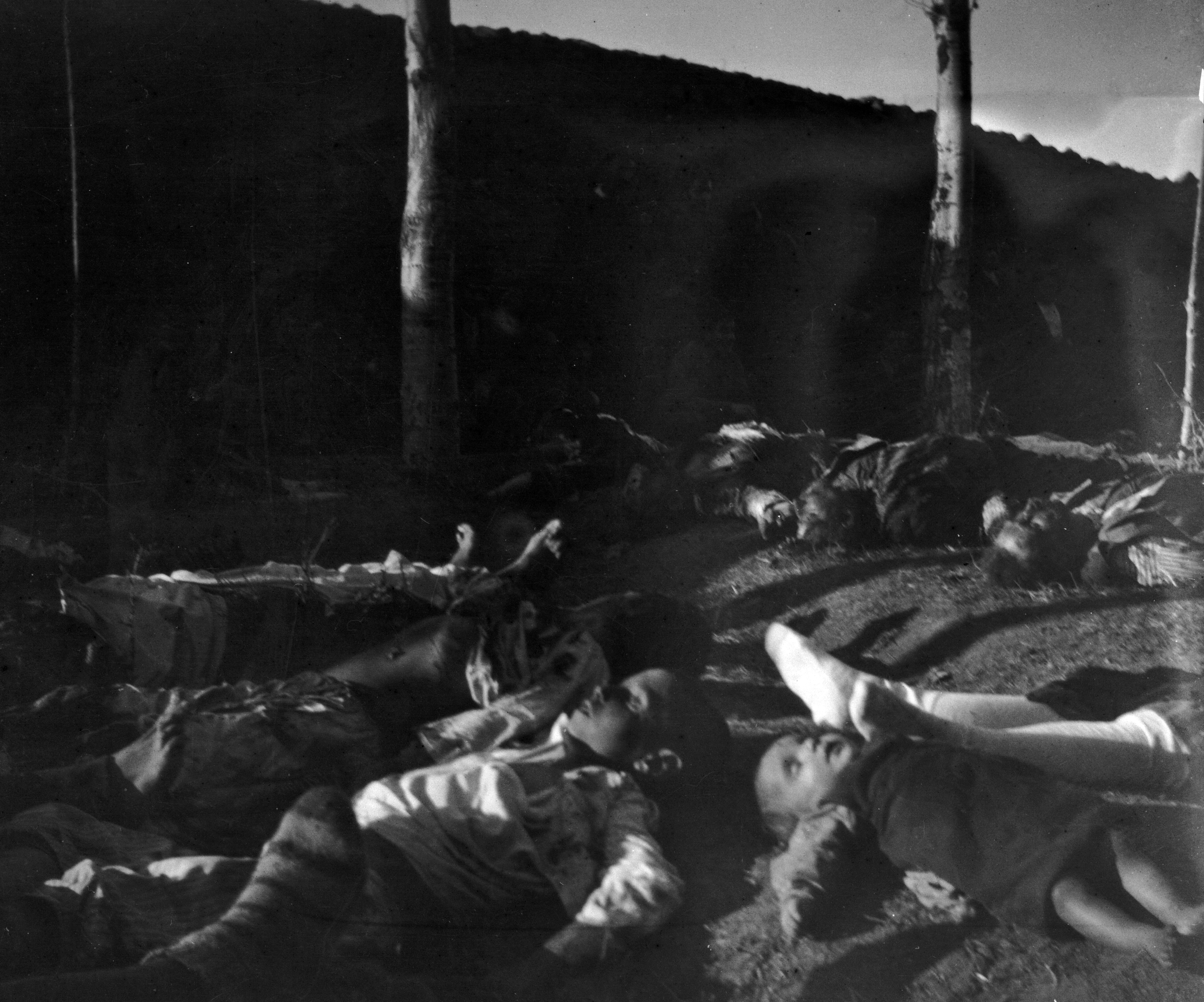
Child victims of a massacre awaiting burial in an Armenian cemetery in Erzurum, 1895

At the height of the massacres, in 1896, Abdul Hamid tried to limit the flow of information coming out of Turkey (Harper's Weekly was banned by Ottoman censors for its extensive coverage of the massacres) and counteract the negative press by enlisting the help of sympathetic Western activists and journalists.

Theodor Herzl responded enthusiastically to Abdul Hamid's personal request to harness "Jewish power" to undermine the widespread sympathy felt for Armenians in Europe. Herzl viewed the arrangement with the Abdul Hamid as temporary, and his services were in exchange for bringing about a more favorable Ottoman attitude toward Zionism. Through his contacts, he supported the publication of favorable impressions of the Ottoman Empire in European newspapers and magazines, while himself attempting (unsuccessfully) to mediate between the Sultan and Armenian party activists in France, Britain, Austria and elsewhere. "Under no circumstances", he wrote to Max Nordau, "are the Armenians to learn that we want to use them in order to erect a Jewish state." Herzl's courting the Sultan's favor was protested by other Zionists. Bernard Lazare published an open letter critical of Herzl and resigned from the Zionist Action Committee in 1899. The one fellow leader Herzl sought to enlist, Max Nordau, replied with a one-word telegram: 'No'.

== Takeover of the Ottoman Bank ==
Despite the great public sympathy that was felt for the Armenians in Europe, none of the European powers took concrete action to alleviate their plight. Frustrated with their indifference and failure to take action, Armenians from the ARF seized the European-managed Ottoman Bank on August 26, 1896, to bring the massacres to their full attention. The action resulted in the deaths of ten of the Armenian militants, Ottoman soldiers and the massacre of 6,000 Armenian civilians living in Constantinople by Ottomans. According to the foreign diplomats in Constantinople, Ottoman central authorities instructed the mob "to start killing Armenians, irrespective of age and gender, for the duration of 48 hours." The killings stopped only when the mob was ordered to desist from such activity by Sultan Hamid. Though their demands were rejected and new massacres broke out in Constantinople, the act was lauded by the European and American press, which vilified Hamid and painted him as the "great assassin" and "bloody Sultan." The Great Powers vowed to take action and enforce new reforms, although these never came to fruition due to conflicting political and economic interests.

== Inaccurate reporting by the Ottoman government ==
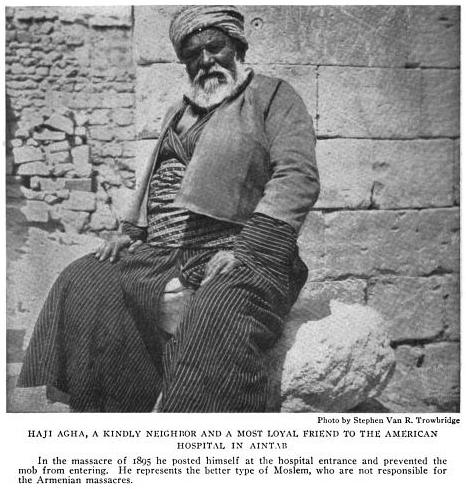
Haji Agha, a Muslim, chose to stand guard at an Aintab hospital to protect it from an anti-Armenian pogrom in 1895.

After George Hepworth, a preeminent journalist of the late 19th century, traveled through Ottoman Armenia in 1897, he wrote Through Armenia on Horseback, which discusses the causes and effects of the recent massacres. In one chapter Hepworth describes the disparity between the reality of the Massacre in Bitlis and the official reports that were sent to the Porte. After retelling the Ottoman version of events, which places the blame solely on the Armenians of Bitlis, Hepworth writes:

…That is the account of the affair which was sent to Yildiz, and that story contains all that the Sultan has any means of knowing about it. It is a most remarkable story, and the discrepancies are as thick as leaves in Valambrosa. On the face of it, it cannot be true, and before a jury it would hardly have any weight as evidence. It is extremely important, however, because it is probably a fair representation of the occurrences of the last few years. That it is a misrepresentation, so much so that it can fairly be called fabrication, becomes clear when you look at it a second time... and yet it is from an official document which the future historian will read when he wishes to compile the facts concerning those massacres.

Official Ottoman sources downplayed or misrepresented the death toll numbers. The attempt of deliberately misrepresenting the numbers were noted by British Ambassador Phillip Currie in a letter to Prime Minister Lord Salisbury:

The Sultan lately sent to me, in common with my colleagues, an urgent message inviting the six Representatives to visit the military and municipal hospitals to see for themselves the number of Turkish soldiers and civilians who had been wounded during the recent disturbances.

I accordingly requested Surgeon Tomlinson, of Her Majesty's ship "Imogene", to make the round of the hospitals in company with Mr. Blech, of Her Majesty's Embassy...

The hospital authorities made attempts to pass off wounded Christians as Mussulmans. Thus, the 112 in the Stamboul [old city of Constantinople] prison were represented as being Muslims, and it was only discovered by accident that 109 were Christians.

== Historiography ==
Some scholars, such as the Soviet historians Mkrtich G. Nersisyan, Ruben Sahakyan, John Kirakosyan, and Yehuda Bauer, and most recently Benny Morris and Dror Ze'evi in their book The Thirty-Year Genocide, subscribe to the view that the mass killings of 1894–1896 marked the first phase of the Armenian genocide. Most scholars, however, limit this definition strictly to the years 1915–1923.

== See also ==
- Armenian genocide
- Yıldız assassination attempt
- Adana massacre
- Anti-Armenian sentiment
- Anti-Armenian sentiment in Turkey
- Armenians in Turkey
- Christianity in the Ottoman Empire
- Christianity in Turkey
- Late Ottoman genocides
- List of massacres in Turkey
- List of conflicts in the Middle East
- Zeitun rebellion (1895–96)
