= Hampartsoum Boyadjian =

Armenian fedayi

Medzn Murad
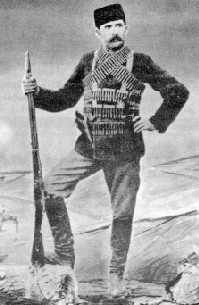
- Born: Hampartsoum Boyadjian; 12 May 1860; Hadjin, Cilicia, Ottoman Empire
- Died: 30 July 1915 (aged 55); Kayseri, Ankara Vilayet, Ottoman Empire
- Spouse: Agyuline Murad
- Military career
- Allegiance: Social Democrat Hunchakian Party
- Service years: 1885—1915
- Nickname: Murad the Great
- Conflicts: Armenian National Liberation Movement; Kum Kapu demonstration (1890); 1894 Sasun Resistance

Hampartsoum Boyadjian (Armenian: Համբարձում Պօյաճեան; 14 May 1860 – 30 July 1915), also known by his noms de guerre Murad and sometimes Medzn Murad (Armenian: Մեծն Մուրատ, "Mourad the Great"), was an Armenian fedayi (partisan leader) and a leading political activist of the Hunchak party.

== Biography ==
He was born in Hadjin in the region of Cilicia. The Hunchakian leader Medzn Girayr (Harutiun-Mardiros Boyadjian) was his senior brother.

Medzn Mourad

Murad joined the Hunchakian party when he was a medical student in Constantinople. In 1890, he took part in the Kum Kapu demonstration. In 1894, he was a leader of the Sasun Resistance. He exhorted the inhabitants of Sasun to fight to their last drop of blood to defend their mountains and houses. Turkish authorities imprisoned and tortured him, and in 1896 Murad was exiled to Tripoli. During his exile the Social Democrat Hunchakian Party convention elected Mourad as a member of its Central Committee. Murad was one of the most popular figures of the Armenian liberation movement, and several revolutionary groups worked towards his liberation. In 1906 he escaped from prison and in 1908 he returned to Constantinople. In the 1908 Ottoman general election, he was elected a member of the Ottoman parliament representing Kozan (Sis) in the Adana Vilayet; he was one of 10 Armenian deputies in the new parliament.

Murad, a Hunchakian who never gave up on the dream of a united and independent Armenia was labelled, like thousands of others, an undesirable by the Young Turk Government. He was among the first to be arrested on 24 April 1915 (known as Red Sunday), on the eve of the Armenian genocide, and sent to Kayseri, where he was severely tortured in prison. After a trial in July, he was hanged on 30 July 1915, with 12 of his friends.

From 1992 to 1994, a battalion named after Medzn Murad led by Gevorg Guzelian took part in the First Nagorno-Karabakh War.

== See also ==
- Armenian genocide
- Adana massacres
- Deportation of Armenian intellectuals on 24 April 1915
- Girayr
- Sebastatsi Murad

== Bibliography ==
- Kévorkian, Raymond H. (2011). The Armenian Genocide: A Complete History. London: I. B. Tauris. ISBN 9781848855618.
- Metsn Murat (Hambardzum Pōyachean): Keankʻn u gortsunēutʻiwně, by Sirvard, Providence, 1955.
- Medzn Mourat, by Yeghia Jerejian, 2016, 248 pages, ISBN 978-9939-860-22-0
