= Mihran Damadian =

Armenian freedom fighter

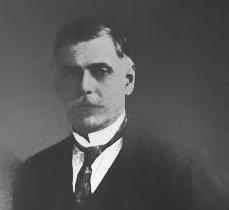
- Born: Mihran Damadian; 1863; Constantinople, Ottoman Empire
- Died: 1945 (aged 81–82); Cairo, Egypt
- Military career
- Allegiance: Social Democrat Hunchakian Party; Armenian Democratic Liberal Party
- Service years: 1890s—1920
- Conflicts: Armenian Revolutionary Movement; Kum Kapu demonstration (1890); 1894 Sasun Resistance

Mihran Damadian (Armenian: Միհրան Տամատեան; 1863 – 1945) was an Armenian freedom fighter, political activist, writer and teacher.

He was educated at the Moorat-Raphael College in Venice, Italy. He then became a teacher in the Sassoun district. With Medzn Mourad, he led the Sassoun Resistance in 1894. He was captured and taken to prison where his captors broke his leg to prevent any possibility of escape. He was sent in chains to Constantinople, and stayed for some time there in prison.

Mihran Damadian was a notable Hunchak (and subsequently a Reformed Hunchak which became known as Ramgavar) activist. He was also the chief negotiator with the French authorities. As negotiator, he proposed that France take the mandate of independent Cilicia in 1920. On 5 August 1920, Damadian declared the independence of Cilicia as an Armenian autonomous republic under French protectorate.

He ran the gauntlet of Turkish guerrillas on the mountain road to Adana.

His great-grandson is stage and opera director and actor Gerald Papasian.
