= Timeline of Armenian national movement =

Armenian national movement

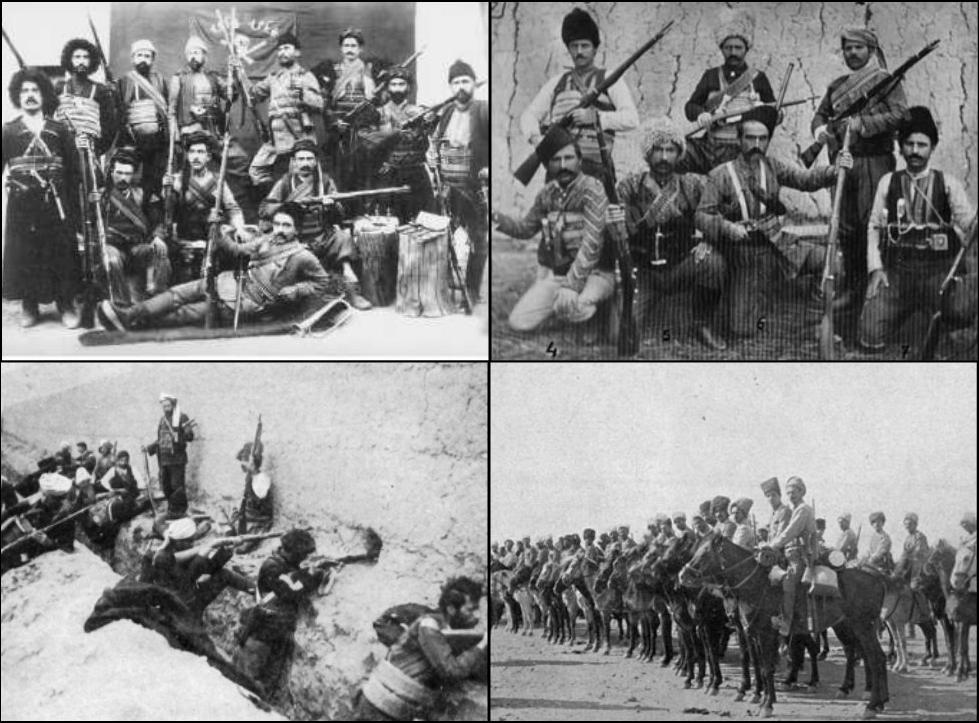
clockwise: Battle of Arakelots, Armenian volunteers at the Caucasus Campaign, Van Resistance of 1915, Khanasor Expedition

The following is the Timeline of Armenian national movement which is the collection of activities during the Armenian national movement.

== 1860 ==
- 1862: Zeitun Uprising (Ottoman Empire)

== 1870 ==
- May 1878: Treaty of San Stefano, Article 16 (Ottoman Empire)
- June 1878: Treaty of Berlin Article 61 (Ottoman Empire)
- June 1878: Catholicos Mgrdich Khrimian patriotic speech “The Paper Ladle” (Ottoman Empire)

== 1880 ==
- 1885: Armenakan Party founded (Russian Armenia)
- 1887: Social Democrat Hunchakian Party founded
- 1889: Bashkale clash (Ottoman Empire)

== 1890 ==
- 1890: Armenian Revolutionary Federation founded (Russian Armenia)
- 1890 September 27: Kukunian Expedition
- 1891: Clash of Nemrut
- 1892: Mkrtich Khrimian becomes Catholicos of All Armenians
- 1894: First Sasun Resistance
- 1894 June 8: Clash of Karakilisa
- 1894 July 21: Battle of Derik
- 1895-1896: Defense of Akhlat
  - Clash of Sokhord
  - Clash of Urtap
  - Clash of Khndzorek
  - Clash of Tapavank
  - Clash of Prkhus
  - Clash of Jrhor
  - Clash of Ktsvak
- 1895 May 18: Clash of Chkhur
- 1895 September 30: Bab Ali Demonstration
- 1895 October: Zeitun Rebellion begins
- 1895 October 26: Defense of the Holy Cross Monastery
- 1896 April 15: Defense of Arshavan
- 1896 June 3–11: Defense of Van
- 1896 August 26: Ottoman Bank Takeover
- 1896 September: The Battles of Sürmene
- 1896 October 12: Battle of Sara-Boghazkeasan
- 1897: Clash of Nemrut
- 1897: Clash of Shamiram
- 1897: Clash of Baghesh
- 1897: Clash of Teghut
- 1897 February 27: Battle of Soghord
- 1897 July: Clash of Süphan Lake
- 1897 July 25–27: Khanasor Expedition
- 1897 September 10: Clash of Van (1897)
- 1897 September 14: Battle of Kem
- 1897: Battle of Tiramer
- 1898: Khatavin Expedition
  - Battle of Ghilichketuk
  - Battle of Keoshk
  - Battle of Khatavin
  - Battle of Averak Jaghats
- 1898: Clash of Kop
- 1898: Battle of Kurubash
- 1898 October 20: Battle of Babshen
- 1899 April 25: Battle of Tsronk
- 1898: Battle of Datvan and Salno Dzor
- 1899: Battle of St. Hovnan Monastery
- 1899 June: Battle of Paghr-Dagh
- 1899 October 25: Battle of Gelieguzan
- 1899 October 26: Battle of Khastur
- 1899 November 2: Battle of Spghan
- 1899 December 2: Battle of Apagha

== 1900 ==
- 1900: Assassination of Bshare Khalil
- 1900: Clash of Mazra
- 1900: Clash of Spaghank
- 1900: Clash of Berdak
- 1900: Clash of Pnav
- 1900: Clash of Ishkhandzor
- 1900: Second Clash of Berdak
- 1900: Clash of Kuravu
- 1901 November: Battle of Holy Apostles Monastery
- 1901: Clash of Norshen
- 1901: Clash of Marnik
- 1901: Clash of Tatragom
- 1901-1903: Operation Potorik
- 1903 June 12: Armenian Church and its property (Russian Armenia)
- 1903: Basen Expedition
- 1904: Battle of Archesh
- 1904: Battle of Razi
- 1904: Mosun Zori Expedition
- 1904: Second Sasun Resistance
  - Clash of Heghin
  - Clash of Hunan
  - Tapik Conspiracy
  - Clash of Talvorik
  - Battle of Lachkan
  - Clash of Ishkhandzor
  - Clashes of Talvorik, Korakhu, Enkuznak
  - Clash of Kop
  - Battle of Semal
  - Battle of Aliank
  - Battle of Chay
  - Clash of Keliekuzan
  - Clash of Merker
  - Clash of Ishkhandzor
  - Clash of Keli
  - Clash of Mkragom
  - Battle of Keliekuzan
  - Transporting of Refugees to the Mush plane
  - Battle of Kop Monastery
  - Clash of Talvorik
  - Clash of Mkragom
  - Clash of Drmert and Aliglkun
  - Clash of Terik, Avran, and Tskhavu
  - Clash of Gomer
  - Second Clash of Gomer
  - Clash of Derkevank
  - Clash of Goms
  - Battle of Kuravu
  - Clash of Aghjan, Sheykh Yusuf, and Alijan
  - Clash of Shamiram
  - Battle of Aghtamar
  - Clash of Mt. Varaga
- 1904: Raid of a Russian military depot in Alexandropol
- 1904: Clash of Narek
- 1904: Clash of Ktsvak
- 1905: Clash of Alijan
- 1905: Clash of Aragh
- 1905: Clash of Kars
- 1905: Clash of Arkavank
- 1905: Clash of Alvarinj
- 1905 January 22: Revolution of 1905 starts in Russia (Russian Armenia)
- 1905-1907: Armenian–Tatar massacres of 1905–1906 (Russian Armenia)
  - 1905 February: Defense of Baku
  - 1905 May: Clashes of Nakhijevan
  - 1905 May: Clashes of Sharur-Daralagyaz
  - 1905 May: Assassination of the Mayor of Baku
  - 1905 May: Defense of Yerevan
  - 1905 May: Clashes of Sisian
  - 1905 May: Clashes of Davalu
  - 1905 May-August: Clashes of Zangezur
  - 1905 July: Clashes of Ghamarlu, Ashtarak, and Minkend
  - 1905 August: Clashes of Shushi
  - 1905 August: Clashes of Varanda and its surroundings
  - 1905 August: Battles of Askeran and Khojaly
  - 1905 July-August: Clashes of Ghazakh
  - 1905 September: Clashes of Gelablu-Divanlar
  - 1905 November: Clashes of Tiflis
  - 1905 November-December: Clashes of Ganja and its surroundings
  - 1905 December: Chaylu-Baghmanlar Clashes
  - 1906 January: Battles of Sarisu-Dozilar-Engisha-Bayramlu
  - 1906 June: Second Clash of Shushi
  - 1906 July-August: Clashes of Kapan and its surroundings.
- 1905 July 21: Yıldız assassination attempt
- 1906: Clash of Shirvanshekh
- 1906: Clash of Khchugh
- 1907 May 27: Battle of Sulukh
- 1907: Clash of Petar
- 1907: Clash of Herker
- 1907: Clash of Meghdi
- 1907: Clash of Baghlu
- 1907: Clash of Tstsmka Kirt
- 1907: Battle of Harutiun Mirakyan's group
- 1907: Battle of Sargis of Van's group
- 1907: Clash of Vozmi
- 1907: Mkrtich Khrimian dies
- 1908: Battle of Koms' group
- 1908: Clash of Tsitsants
- 1908: Clash of Sevtik
- 1908: Battle of Terik
- 1908: Battle of Ashtishat
- 1908: Young Turk Revolution
- 1908: Participation in the Persian Constitutional Revolution
  - 1908 October: Clash of Muzhambar
  - 1908 October: Clash of Tabriz
  - 1908 October: Clash of Urmia
  - 1908 October: Clashes in the Salmast region
  - 1908 October: Clashes in the Khoy region
  - 1909 February: Clashes of Alvar and Salmast
  - 1909 February: Clashes in the Maku region
  - 1909 March: Battle of Resht
  - 1909 March-April: Clashes of Qazvin and Kharzan
  - 1909 March: Clashes in the Julfa region
  - 1910 January: Clashes of Kajar and Capture of Tehran
  - 1910 January-April: Clashes of Tabriz and its surrounding regions
  - 1911: Clashes of Berdavar (Avarayr Plane)
  - 1911 April: Clashes of Zanjan
  - 1911 April: Clashes of Mazandaran
  - 1912 April 25: Battle of Hamadan

== 1910 ==
- 1911: George V becomes Catholicos of All Armenians
- 1912 January: The arrest of Armenian intellectuals (Russian Armenia)
- 1912 November: George V creates the Armenian National Delegation, led by Boghos Nubar
- 1912 October 8: Armenian Volunteering in the First Balkan War

=== 1914 ===
- 1914 January–February: Armenian reform package
- 1914 November 1: Bergmann Offensive. Drastamat Kanayan and second battalion of the Armenian volunteers (Caucasus Campaign)
- 1914: Battle of Sarikamish. Hamazasp (Srvandztian) and 3rd battalion. Keri (Arshak Gavafian) and 4th battalion. (Caucasus Campaign)

=== 1915 ===
- 1915 March: Zeitun Resistance (Armenian Resistance)
- 1915 April-August: Defense of Sasun (Armenian Resistance)
- 1915 April–May: Siege of Van (Armenian Resistance)
- 1915 May 27: Tehcir Law
- 1915 June: Shabin-Karahisar uprising (Armenian Resistance)
- 1915 June: Musa Dagh Resistance (Armenian Resistance)
- 1915 July 26: Battle of Manzikert
- 1915 September: Urfa Resistance (Armenian Resistance)

=== 1916 ===
- 1916 August: Battle of Bitlis. Andranik and his volunteers. (Caucasus Campaign)

=== 1917 ===
- 1917 February 23: Russian Revolution (Russian Armenia)
- 1917 November 7: Bolshevik rule (Russian Armenia)
- 1917 December 5: Armistice of Erzincan (Caucasus Campaign)

=== 1918 ===
- 1918 March 3: Treaty of Brest-Litovsk (Caucasus Campaign)
- 1918 May 26: Battle of Sardarapat (Caucasus Campaign)
- 1918 May 28: Official declaration of First Republic of Armenia (Caucasus Campaign)
- 1918 June 4: Treaty of Batum (Caucasus Campaign)
- 1918 October 30: Armistice of Mudros (Caucasus Campaign)

=== 1919 ===
- 1919 January 29: Aram Manukian dies
- 1919 July 5: Turkish Courts-Martial of 1919–1920

== 1920 ==
- 1920 August 10: Treaty of Sèvres
- 1920 September 29-December 2: (Turkish and Soviet Invasion of Armenia)
- 1920 November 25: Simon Vratsian becomes Prime Minister
- 1920 November 29: Soviet army in Yerevan and fall of Armenian government
- 1920 December 3: Treaty of Alexandropol

=== 1921 ===
- 1921 February: February Uprising starts
- 1921 Mach 15: Talaat Pasha killed (Operation Nemesis)
- 1921 March 16: Treaty of Moscow
- 1921 July 13: Republic of Mountainous Armenia ensures Syunik remains part of Armenia
- 1921 July 5: Karabakh given to Azerbaijan by Stalin's decision
- 1921 October 13: Treaty of Kars

=== 1922 ===
- 1922 July 21: Djemal Pasha killed (Operation Nemesis)

== See also ==
- Timeline of Armenian history
- Timeline of Artsakh history
- Armenian genocide
