= Khetcho =

- Խէչօ
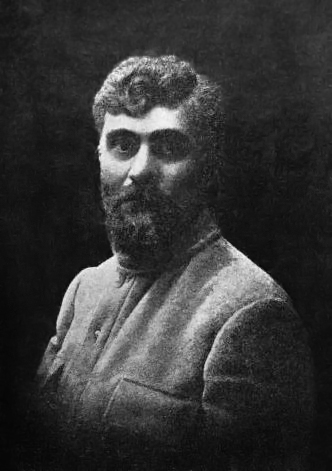
- Born: 1872; Nakhichevan, Russian Empire
- Died: July 1915 (aged 42–43); Bitlis, Ottoman Empire
- Military career
- Allegiance: Dashnaktsutyun (?–1915); Russian Empire (1914–1915)
- Service years: ?–1915
- Conflicts: Armenian National Liberation Movement; Defense of Van (1896); Khanasor Expedition; Armenian–Tatar War; Persian Constitutional Revolution; World War I; Caucasus Campaign; Defense of Van (1915)

Khetcho (Armenian: Խէչօ; 1872 – July 1915) was an Armenian activist and combatant. A member of the Armenian Revolutionary Federation, Khetcho led an active life in Armenian politic affairs. During his time as an activist, he participated in the Khanasor Expedition, an offensive by Armenian fedayees against the Kurdish Mazrik tribe on July 25, 1897. He was also a key supporter of the Iranian Constitutional Revolution. In 1915, during a skirmish between Turkish forces near Bitlis, he was killed in action.

== Early life ==
Khetcho was born Khachatur Amiryan in 1872 in Nakhichevan which was then part of the Russian Empire. His father was a local priest at the Armenian church. He studied in Shushi at the local Diocese School. Khetcho goes on to become a trainer of Armenian revolutionary fighters who were mainly stationed in the Caucasus.

== Khanasor Expedition ==
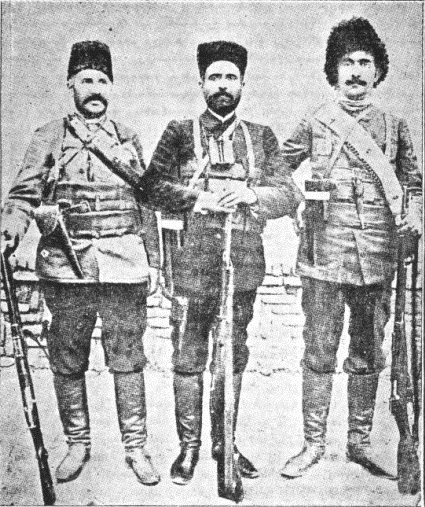
From left to right: Keri, Yeprem Khan, and Khetcho

In 1896, during the aftermath of the Defense of Van, the Mazrik tribe had ambushed many of the Armenian defenders of Van as they were retreating into Persia. The Armenian Revolutionary Federation decided to retaliate, resulting in the Khanasor Expedition. Khetcho departed from Persia and participated in the expedition which became his first armed combat mission. During the mission, Khetcho met Yeprem Khan, another Armenian Revolutionary who Khetcho eventually collaborated with during the Iranian Constitutional Revolution.

== Armeno-Tatar clashes ==
Thereafter, during the Armenian–Tatar massacres of 1905–07, Khetcho participated in the defense of Armenians throughout the Caucasus. During his participation, he was assistant to Nikol Duman, an Armenian fedayee from Karabakh. He was in charge of defending Armenian villages that were situated next to the Arax river.

== Iranian Constitutional Revolution ==
During the Iranian Constitutional Revolution, Khetcho fought the anti-constitutionalists alongside Yeprem Khan and Keri from 1908 to 1910. Khetcho's unit spearheaded the monarchist's army becoming a viable force within its ranks. In 1910, while in battle, Khetcho's jawbone was shattered by a bullet. Thereafter, he was forced to settle in Switzerland.

== World War I ==
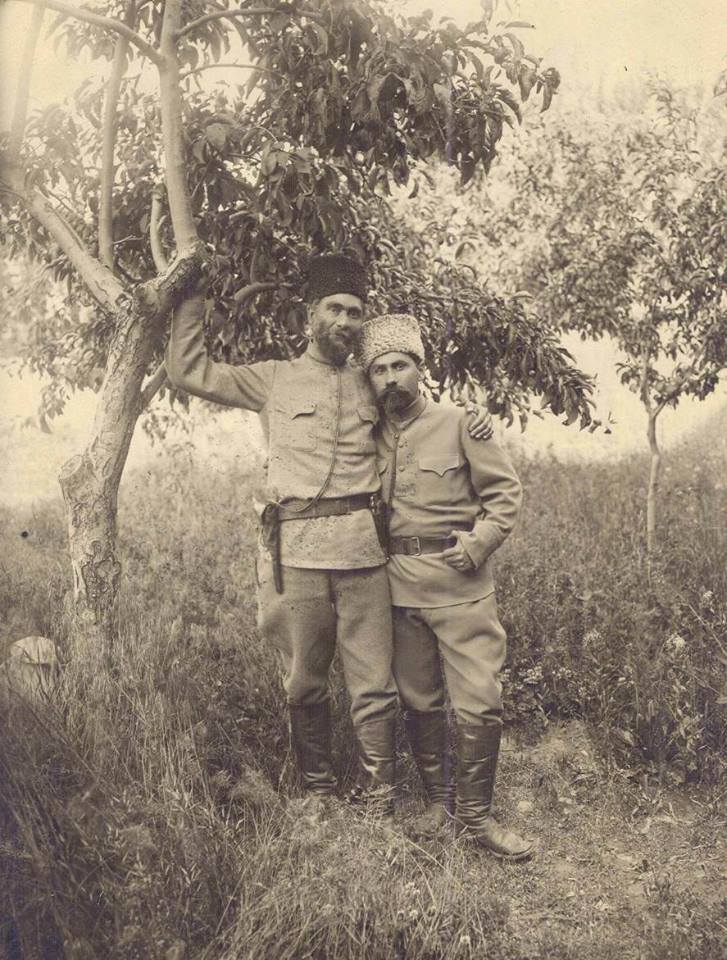
Khetcho and Dro

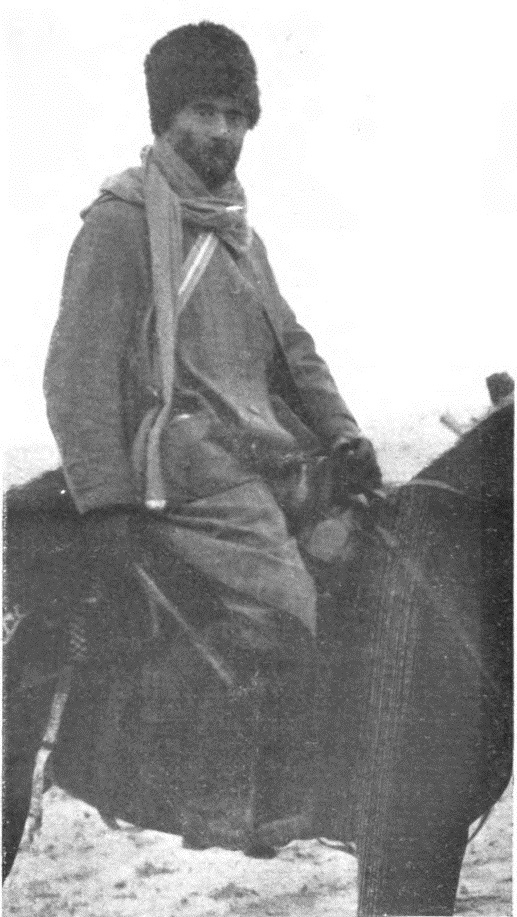
Khetcho on horseback

In the First Balkan War of 1912–13, the Ottoman Empire had lost its Balkan possessions to Christian uprisings, intensifying fears in the Turkish homeland that the Empire's increasingly restive Armenian Christian minority—with the assistance or encouragement of Western governments—might also attempt to establish an independent state, resulting in the breakup of Turkey itself. Distrust and suspicion of Armenians reached a peak following the outbreak of World War I, when a successful advance of Russian troops across the Turkish border into the heavily Armenian-populated vilayet of Van in early 1915 was blamed on Armenian disloyalty, leading the Turkish government to adopt a set of extreme measures which would culminate in the Armenian genocide.

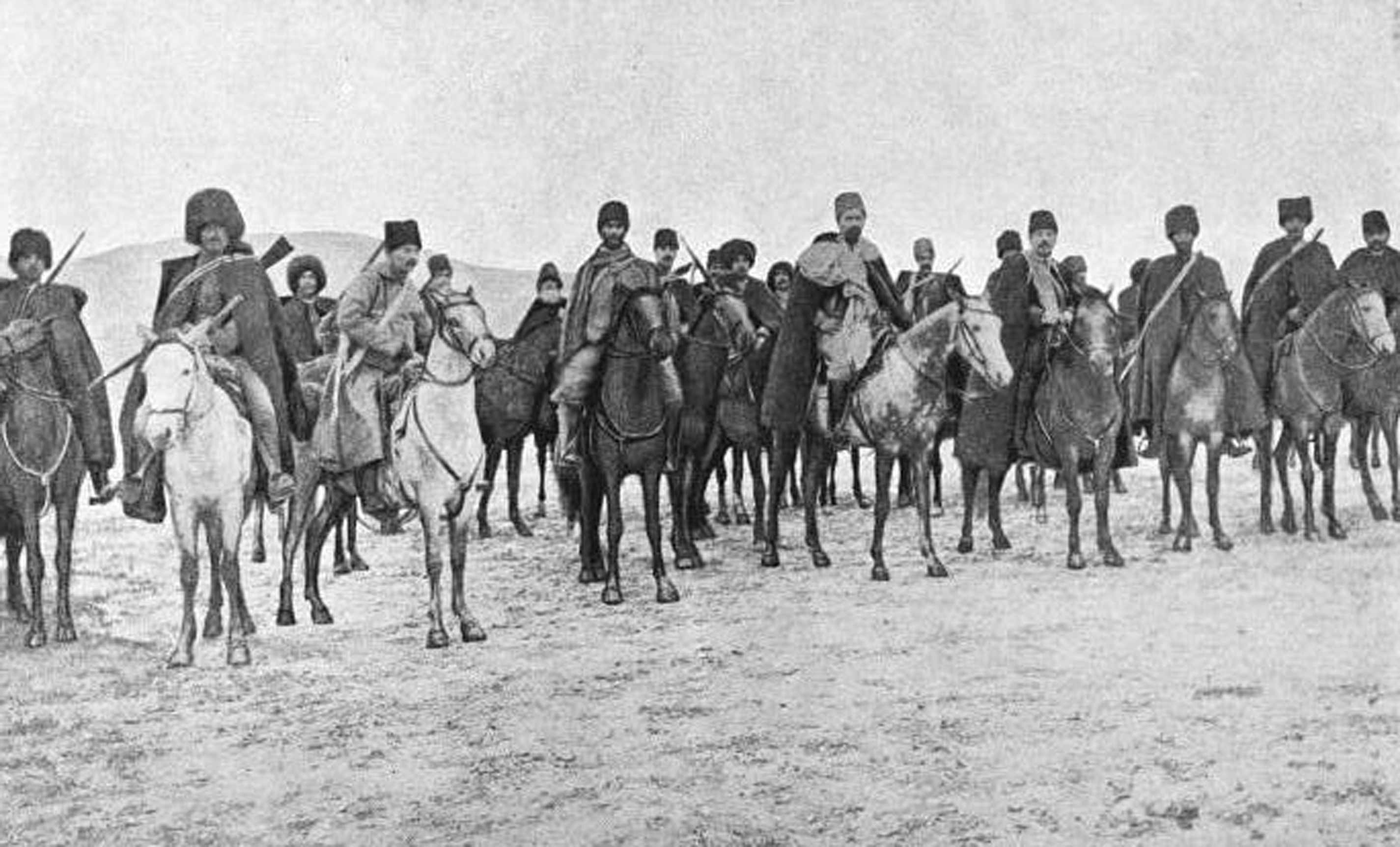
1914, Members of the Armenian volunteer units; Armen Garo, Khetcho, and Drastamat Kanayan

Prior to the start of World War I, Khetcho participated in the Armenian Revolutionary Federation Council meeting in Berlin. Khetcho was then tasked to acquire armaments in order to support self-defense efforts. At the start of the war, he was one of the five Armenian legions formed to enter Ottoman territory forming the Armenian volunteer units under Russian command. During the Van Resistance, Khetcho's unit was among the first to enter and liberate it on May 5, 1915. This was followed by the Russian armies occupation of the city a few days later.

== Death ==
After Van was liberated, Khetcho and his squadron were assigned to assist self-defense efforts in Mush and Sassoun. In July 1915, Khetcho stopped in Bitlis, where in June 1915, during the Armenian genocide, Turks and Kurds, led by Jevdet Bey, were known to have massacred 15,000 Armenians. In preparation for a Russian advance, the Turkish forces mounted their artillery atop a mountain with a clear path to launch a renewed offensive onto the village. Fearing an impending massacre upon the Armenian population of the village, Khetcho and his regiment led a cavalry offensive against the Turkish army pushing them higher up the mountain. However, during a counter-attack by Turkish forces, Khetcho was fatally wounded. His body was taken to Van where he was ultimately buried next to other Armenian revolutionaries.
