= Sargis Mehrabyan =

Armenian revolutionary

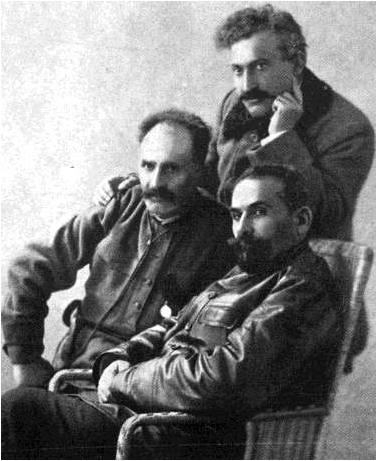
- Keri of the 4th battalion, Hamazasp of the 3rd battalion, Vartan of regiment of Ararat
- Born: Sargis Mehrabyan; Karabakh, Elisabethpol Governorate, Russian Empire
- Died: 1943; Yerevan, Armenian SSR, Soviet Union
- Military career
- Allegiance: Dashnaktsutyun (1890–1920s); Russian Empire (1914–1917); Republic of Armenia (1918–1920)
- Branch: Russian Armenian Volunteer Corps
- Service years: 1890–1920s
- Nicknames: Vartan; Khanassori
- Commands: Ararat Armenian volunteer battalion
- Conflicts: Armenian National Liberation Movement; Khanasor Expedition; Armenian–Tatar War; World War I; Siege of Van

Sargis Mehrabyan (Armenian: Սարգիս Մեհրաբյան), also known as Commander Vartan, Vartan of Khanasor and Vartan Mehrpanian, was an Armenian fedayee military commander and member of the Armenian Revolutionary Federation.

== Biography ==
Sargis Mehrabyan was one of the founding members of the Armenian Revolutionary Federation party and a close friend of leaders Kristapor Mikayelian and Simon Zavarian. In the 1890s, he directed party activity in Iranian Azerbaijan, where he organized the transfer of people and supplies of weapons to fight against Ottoman Turkey. He was commonly known by his nom de guerre Vartan.

At the time of the Hamidian massacres in the summer of 1896, he led the defense of villages in the region of the current Catak district in Western Armenia (now Turkey) and the Van province. The following year, he was one of the leaders, along with Prince Hovsep Arghutian, who headed the Khanasor Expedition in Western Armenia, to fight against the ethnic cleansing carried out by the Kurdish Hamidiye irregulars commanded by Sharif Bey, who had a role in the Hamidian massacres with his cavalry. On 24 July 1897, Vartan led 253 men across the Turkish-Persian border and engaged the men of Sharif Bey in the valley of Khanasor at dawn. The next day, after twelve hours of fighting, the Kurdish and Ottoman cavalry captains had been defeated and all men had been killed. Sharif Bey had fled, disguised in women's clothing, escaped overlooked because Vartan ordered not to attack women and children. He lost twenty men in the battle. Afterward, Vartan received the honorary nickname Vardan Khanassori.

In the summer of 1905, after the start of the Armenian–Tatar massacres, Vartan was called to his native Karabakh to organize and command the self-defense of the region against the exactions of the Azerbaijanis (Tatars).

After the outbreak of the First World War, he was granted amnesty in Russia and joined the Imperial Russian Army. He commanded the Ararat Armenian volunteer battalion on the Caucasus Campaign beginning in 1915. The brigade led the release of the city of Van and ended the siege on 19 May 1915.

== See also ==
- Armenian Revolutionary Federation
