= Harutiun Shahrigian =

- Armenian: Յարութիւն Շահրիկեան (Ատոմ)
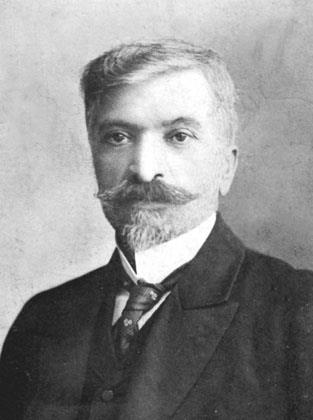
- Born: Harutiun Shahrigian Mkrtichi; 1860; Shabin-Karahisar, Ottoman Empire
- Died: 1915 (aged 54–55); Ankara, Ottoman Empire
- Military career
- Allegiance: Dashnaktsutyun
- Service years: 1880–1915
- Nicknames: Atom, Adom, Nitra
- Conflicts: Armenian national liberation movement Khanasor Expedition; Armenian–Tatar massacres of 1905–07

Harutiun Shahrigian (Armenian: Յարութիւն Շահրիկեան; 1860–1915) was an Armenian politician, soldier, lawyer, and author.

Better known by nicknames Atom, (Armenian: Ատոմ), Nitra (Armenian: Նիթրա), he had a prominent role in the Armenian Revolutionary Federation (ARF) and was also a member of the Armenian National Assembly, a lawyer and author of publications on the Armenian Question. He was a victim of the Armenian genocide.

== Biography ==
Haruiun Shahrigian was born in 1860 in Shabin-Karahisar, Sivas Vilayet in the Ottoman Empire—today in Turkey's Giresun Province.

Shahrigian graduated from Galatasaray High School located in Constantinople. He continued his studies at the University of Constantinople, graduating with a degree in law in 1880.

He settled in Trabzon where he worked as a lawyer from 1889 to 1895. During his career he defended Armenians imprisoned for political activity.

He was imprisoned during the Hamidian massacres in 1895. In 1897, after spending thirteen months in prison, he escaped and settled in Batumi, ultimately moving to Tiflis. There Shahrigian continued his legal career, working in association with Alexander Mantashev.

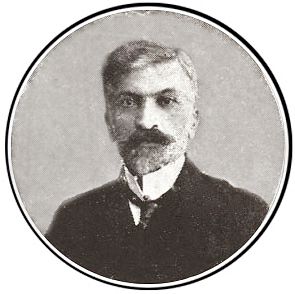
Harutiun Shahrigian

On 25 July 1897, he left to Salmas, Persia in order to coordinate the Khanasor Expedition organized by the Armenian Revolutionary Federation.

He participated in a 16–26 January 1898 congress of ARF Eastern Bodies members in Tiflis. There he served on the Potorig Committee from 1901 to 1903. Shahrgian and Avetik Sahakyan were responsible for ARF operations in the region of Baku (Voskanapat) and northern regions of Russia.

"The future, then, lies not in fusion – assimilation – but in a policy of unity, or more correctly, in a policy of pluralistic unity. Erase variety in nature, in the universe, make the universe uniform, and you will have erased the beauty of nature, its harmony, its life. Variety in nature, which seems to put every element at odds with another, actually, through harmony, forms the greatness of the perpetual motion of the universe."

— Harutiun Shahrigian in Mer Havadke (English: Our Credo)

From 1905 to 1906 he organized the transportation and delivery of ammunition to front line positions to assist in self-defense efforts during the Armenian–Tatar massacres of 1905–07.

After the Young Turk Revolution of 1908 he moved to Constantinople where he participated in the Armenian National Assembly representing the district of Scutari. He was also a contributor to the newspaper Azadamard.

During the Armenian genocide in 1915 he was deported to Ayas, where he was tortured and ultimately killed in the outskirts of Ankara.

== Publications ==
- Our Credo, Constantinople, 1910
- Мarriage Questions, legal and social character, Constantinople, 1912
- History of Decline of the Ottoman Empire, Turkey, 1913
- Question of Reforms, Constantinople, 1914
- National Constitution, Constantinople, 1914

== See also ==
- Deportation of Armenian intellectuals on 24 April 1915
