= List of massacres of Azerbaijanis =

The following is a list of massacres of Azerbaijanis (Note: "The official records of the Russian Empire and various published sources from the pre-1917 period also called them "Tatar" or "Caucasian Tatars", "Azerbaijani Tatars" and even "Persian Tatars" in order to differentiate them from the other "Tatars" of the empire and the Persian speakers of Iran." For the sake of simplicity, this article uses "Azerbaijanis" for the people group.) that have occurred throughout history.

During pre-Soviet times, the term "Caucasian Tatar" was used for the group who is nowadays called "Azerbaijanis." For instance, this is apparent in the designation Armenian–Tatar massacres. However, these terms are today and in this article interchangeable.

Name	Date	Location	Perpetrators	Victims (highest estimation)
Armenian–Tatar massacres	1905–1906	(Russian Empire) Baku, Ganja, Nakhchivan, Shusha, and Tbilisi	Armenia and (Azerbaijan) Azerbaijanis	3,000 to 10,000 from both sides
Massacres of Azerbaijanis in Armenia in 1917–1921	1917–1921	(Armenia) Ararat, Kars, Surmalu, Syunik	(Armenia) Armenian and (Russia) Russian army	In Erivan Governorate, 4,000; in Zangezur uezd, 7,729–10,000
March Days	March 1918	(Azerbaijan) Baku	(Russian Soviet Federative Socialist Republic) Baku Commune forces	3,000–12,000
1920 Ganja Revolt	June 1920	(Azerbaijan) Ganja	(Russian Soviet Federative Socialist Republic) 11th Red Army	15,000
1979 Solduz Massacre	April 1979	(Iran) Naqadeh	(Kurdistan Region) KDPI, Komala Party Kurdish Nationalists	120 Families
Black January	January 1990	(Azerbaijan Soviet Socialist Republic) Baku	(Soviet Union) Red Army	137; unofficial number reaching 300
Gugark pogrom	March – December 1988	(Armenian Soviet Socialist Republic) Gugark, Lori Province	(Armenian Soviet Socialist Republic) Armenian mobs	11–21
Capture of Garadaghly	February 1992	(Azerbaijan) Garadaghly	(Republic of Artsakh) Armenian irregular units	unclear; 20 per Azerbaijani sources, 53 per Monte Melkonian
Khojaly massacre	February 1992	(Azerbaijan) Khojaly	(Republic of Artsakh) Armenian irregular units	200+ per HRW 613 per Azerbaijani government

== See also ==
- Anti-Azerbaijani sentiment

== Bibliography ==
- Aharonian, Avetis (1963). "From Sardarapat to Sèvres and Lausanne (A Political Diary) (Part IV)". The Armenian Review. 16 (3).
- Baberovski, Yorg (2010). Враг есть везде. Сталинизм на Кавказе [The enemy is everywhere. Stalinism in the Caucasus] (in Russian). Moscow: Rossiyskaya politicheskaya entsiklopediya (ROSSPEN) Fond «Prezidentskiy tsentr B. N. Yeltsina». ISBN 978-5-8243-1435-9. Archived from the original on 8 October 2022.
- Balayev, Aydyn (1990). Азербайджанское национально-демократическое движение 1917-1929 гг [The Azerbaijani national-democratic movement in 1917–1929] (in Russian). Baku. ISBN 978-5-8066-0422-5. Archived from the original on 6 November 2022.
