= Nikol Duman =

Armenian fedayi

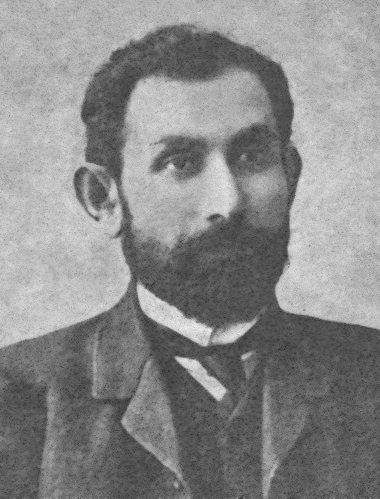
- Born: Nikoghayos Ter-Hovhannisyan; 12 January 1867; Kyshlak, Elisabethpol Governorate, Russian Empire
- Died: 23 September 1914 (aged 47); Kislovodsk, Stavropol Governorate, Russian Empire
- Burial place: Armenian Pantheon of Tbilisi, Tbilisi, Georgia
- Military career
- Allegiance: Dashnaktsutyun
- Service years: ?—1914
- Conflicts: Armenian National Liberation Movement; Khanasor Expedition; Sasun Uprising; Persian Constitutional Revolution

Nikol Duman (Armenian: Նիկոլ Դուման), born Nikoghayos Ter-Hovhannisyan (Armenian: Նիկողայոս Տեր-Հովհաննիսյան; (Note: Pre-reform spelling: Նիկողայոս Տէր Յովհաննիսեան) 12 January 1867 – 23 September 1914), was an Armenian revolutionary from Karabakh. He was a member of the Armenian Revolutionary Federation. He was active in the Russian Empire, Persia and the Ottoman Empire.

== Early life ==
Nikoghayos Ter-Hovhannisyan was born to an Armenian family in the village of Kyshlak (today Gyshlag or Tsaghkashat) in the region of Nagorno-Karabakh, then a part of the Russian Empire. His father was a priest. In 1887, he graduated from the Shushi diocesan school. He then taught in Armenian schools in the North Caucasus until 1891, when he moved to Tabriz, where he was a teacher and also the treasurer of the circle of local Armenian national figures.

Beginning in 1893, he taught at the school in the village of Galasar, Salmas, where he took an active part in Armenian national and political life as a member of the Armenian Revolutionary Federation (ARF). Nikol was one of the three members of the ARF committee in Tabriz, along with Hovnan Davtyan and Hovsep Arghutian.

== Revolutionary activity ==
After the Hamidian massacres of Armenians in the Ottoman Empire from 1894 to 1896, Nikol entirely devoted himself to the Armenian national liberation movement and organization of self-defense.

In 1895, he moved to Van with a group of 50 people. His house was besieged by the Kurdish Hamidiye cavalry. Although the Kurds had set fire to his house, Nikol managed to escape under the cover of smoke and went to the nearby mountains, where he and his men firing back and killed two Hamidiye members. Admiring his courage, the Kurds nicknamed him "Duman" ("Storm").

He was arrested in Van, but soon released.

Duman was the initiator of the 1897 Khanasor Expedition, an attack on the Kurdish Mazrik tribe and its commander Sharaf Beg for their role in the Hamidian massacres and ambush at Van, and took part in the campaign as a squad leader. The attack began on 25 July 1897 and ended on 27 July 1897. All of the men in the tribe were killed and only the women and children were spared, a mercy the Turks and Kurds never gave the Armenians. Sharaf Beg managed to escape.

Afterward, Duman moved back to the Russian Empire, in Tiflis. During the 1904 Sasun uprising, he is tried to get his men to Sason, but was unable to.

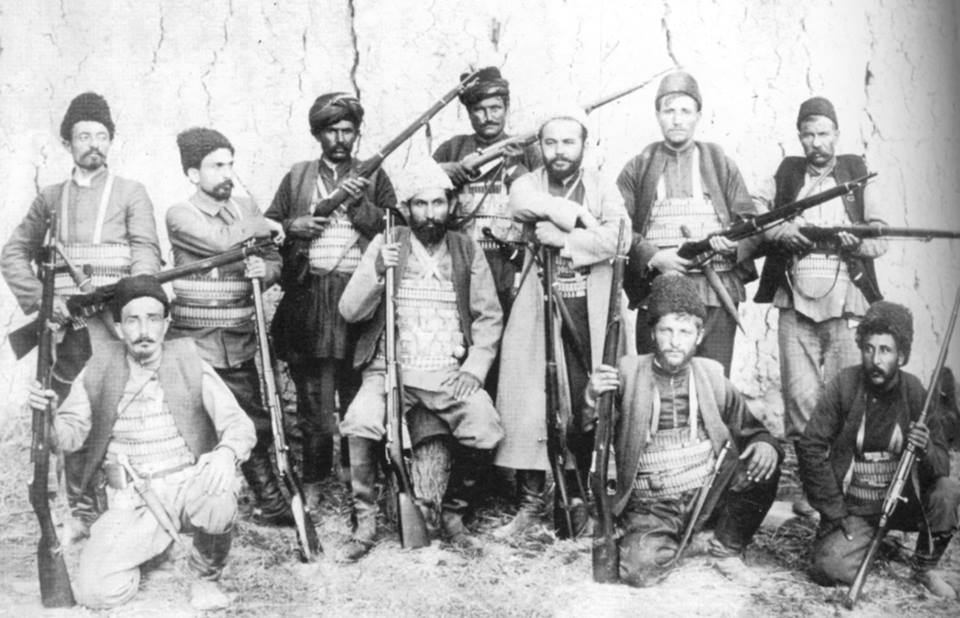
Nikol Duman (sitting, center) with his comrades

At the beginning of the Armenian-Tatar massacres in February 1905, he was hastily called by telegram to Baku, where he organized a self-defense and, on 7 February, had successfully arrived to fight against Tatars. Duman was then appointed head of the self-defense of Erivan region. He was an advocate of the liberation of Western Armenia and proposed a general uprising. He took part in the ARF party congresses, and in 1910, was present at the Second Copenhagen International Congress.

Following the Young Turk Revolution of 1908, he led operations in Van, Erzurum and Trabzon. He also took part in the Persian Constitutional Revolution, leading the ARF forces during the defense of Tabriz.

== Death ==
In 1914, he became ill with tuberculosis and went for treatment in Kislovodsk. At the same time, the First World War was beginning. Feeling that he would not be able to participate with the other Armenian fedayi, Duman committed suicide with a pistol shot on the evening of 23 September 1914. He was buried in Tbilisi, at the Armenian Pantheon of Tbilisi, next to the grave of one of the founders of the Armenian Revolutionary Federation, Simon Zavarian.

== Legacy ==
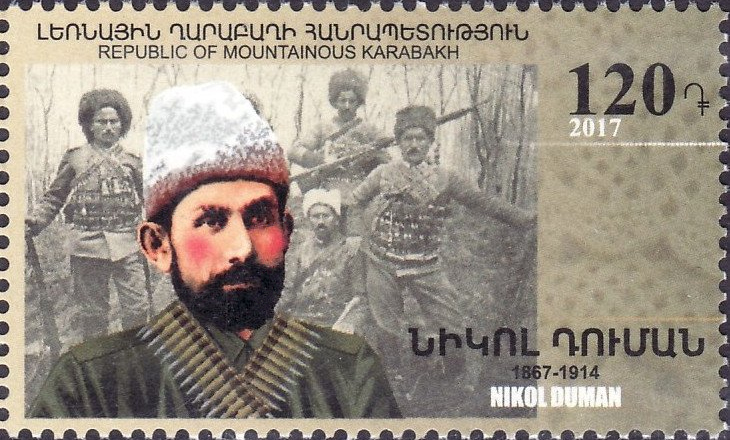
Duman on a 2017 stamp of the Nagorno-Karabakh Republic

Nikol Duman's house museum is located in his native village of Kyshlak in the Nagorno-Karabakh Republic. Several cities in Armenia contain streets named after Nikol Duman.
