= Armenian resistance during the Armenian genocide =

Armenian resistance in the Ottoman Empire during WWI

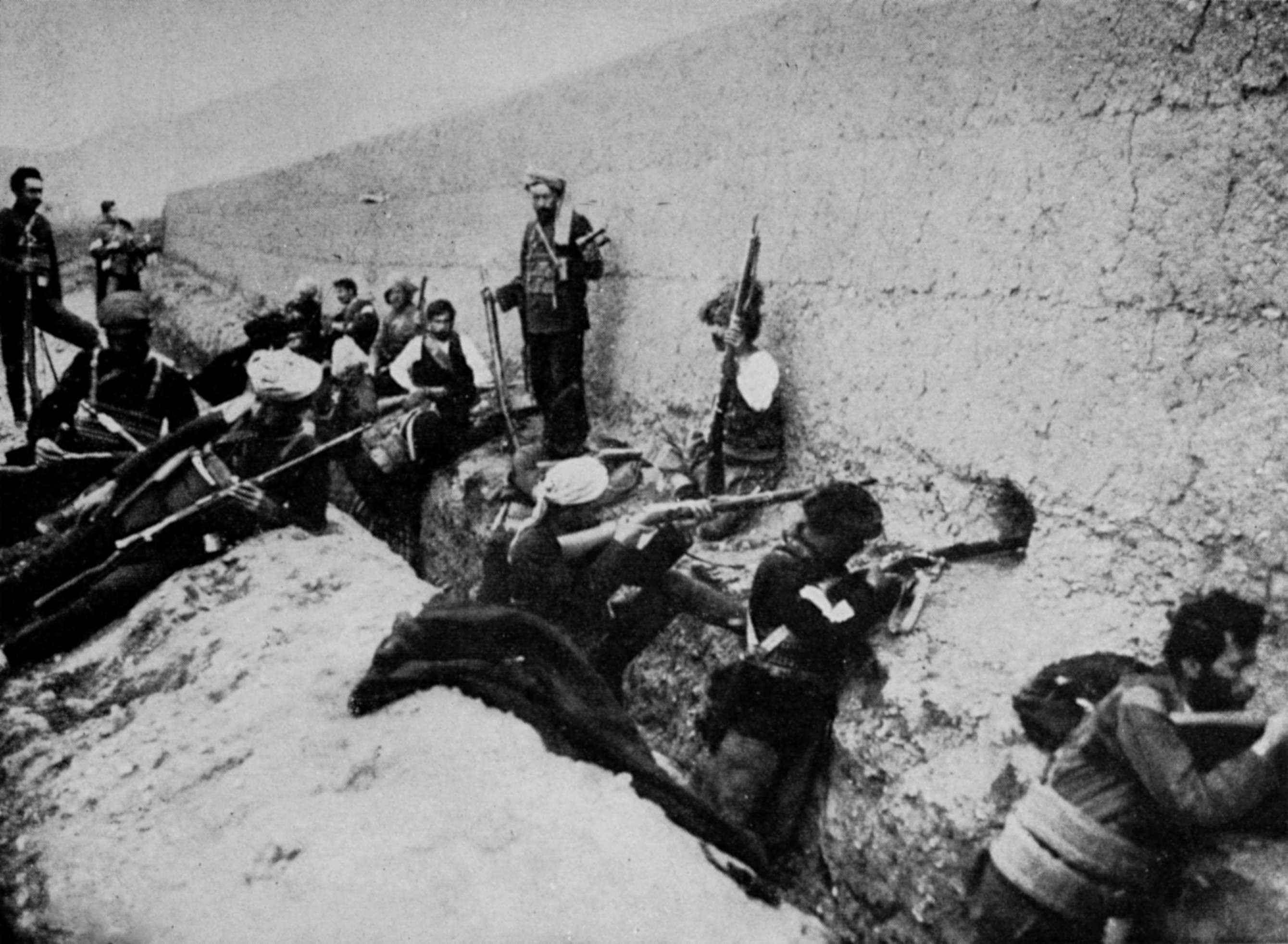
Armenian defenders during the 1915 siege of Van

Armenian resistance included military, political, and humanitarian efforts to counter Ottoman forces and mitigate the Armenian genocide during World War I. Early in World War I, the Ottoman Empire commenced efforts to eradicate Armenian culture and eliminate Armenian life, through acts of killing and death marches into uninhabitable deserts and mountain regions. The result was the homogenisation of the Ottoman Empire and elimination of 90% of the Armenian Ottoman population.

Those efforts were countered by Armenian attempts to mitigate the plight through the establishment of humanitarian networks. Those provided for basic needs like food and hiding places. Several armed uprisings attempted to resist deportation, namely the defence of Van, and in Musa Dagh and Urfa. Still, violent resistance was rare and often not effective, compared to the humanitarian network which saved up to 200,000 Armenians from death. Local resistance movements were notably supported by a transnational network of help, namely the ABCFM, US Armenian relief committee, and missionaries.

Additionally, military efforts to counter the Ottoman Army were conducted by Armenian forces, such as the Armenian Resistance Forces (called fedayeen/fedayis) and the Armenian irregular units. Those supported Russian efforts to advance on the Ottoman front in the Caucasus.

== Humanitarian resistance against the genocide ==
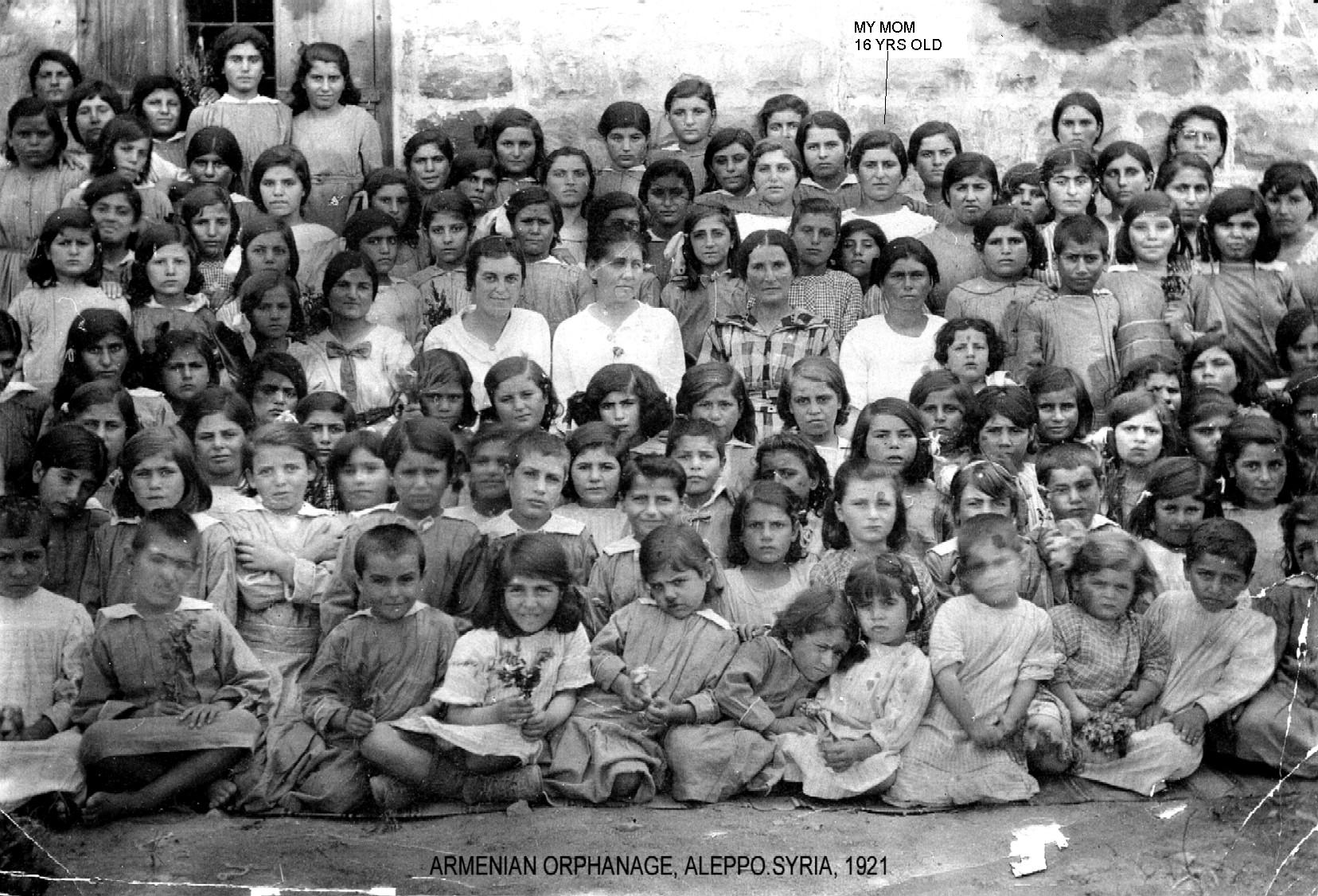
Armenian orphanage in Aleppo, Syria

Humanitarian resistance refers to illegal conduct to mitigate the effects of deportation and prevent annihilation. Core actors of this resistance were religious and civic leaders, such as church committees, doctors and nurses, local Muslims, and influential Armenian dignitaries and foreign missionaries. Those established a self-help network, which supplied deportees in camps with basic needs, such as food, fuelwood, and financial support through money transfer. This network saved thousands of Armenians from death. At the beginning of the deportations, such efforts were still legal but with increasing tensions, those efforts faced crackdowns in 1915, criminalization and forcing to move into the underground.

From this onwards, the resistance conducted fewer public actions. Refugees were hidden in private homes, community centres, and children in orphanages. Military factories and hospitals under the influence of network members served the purpose of employing Armenians, providing them with a permit to move freely in the city and integrating them successfully into their new environment. This prevented their deportation.

=== Individual resistance ===
In the camps, support systems were established to care for orphans and provide health care. Individuals, from the Muslim population, and officers like city authorities resisted orders of deportation and faced removal from their posts.

=== Resistance through information gathering ===
Information was an important part of the resistance and was essential for survival. Smuggled letters of information about the developments in other camps, abuses of CUP officials on deportees and advice on how to survive in the camps helped Armenians to adapt to the new life realities. The full impact of the genocide was long withheld from the Ottoman and international public. Censorship of foreign embassies impeded international attention and intervention. To circumvent the Ottoman censoring, new modes of expression were employed. Such were quoting of biblical passages and literary works, which enabled a restricted spreading of the knowledge of the genocide in international media and politics. Such information provoked international support systems such as the ABCFM, American Board of Commissioners for Foreign Missions and the founding of the US Armenian relive committee, leading to fundraising and enacting international pressure.

== Military resistance against the genocide ==
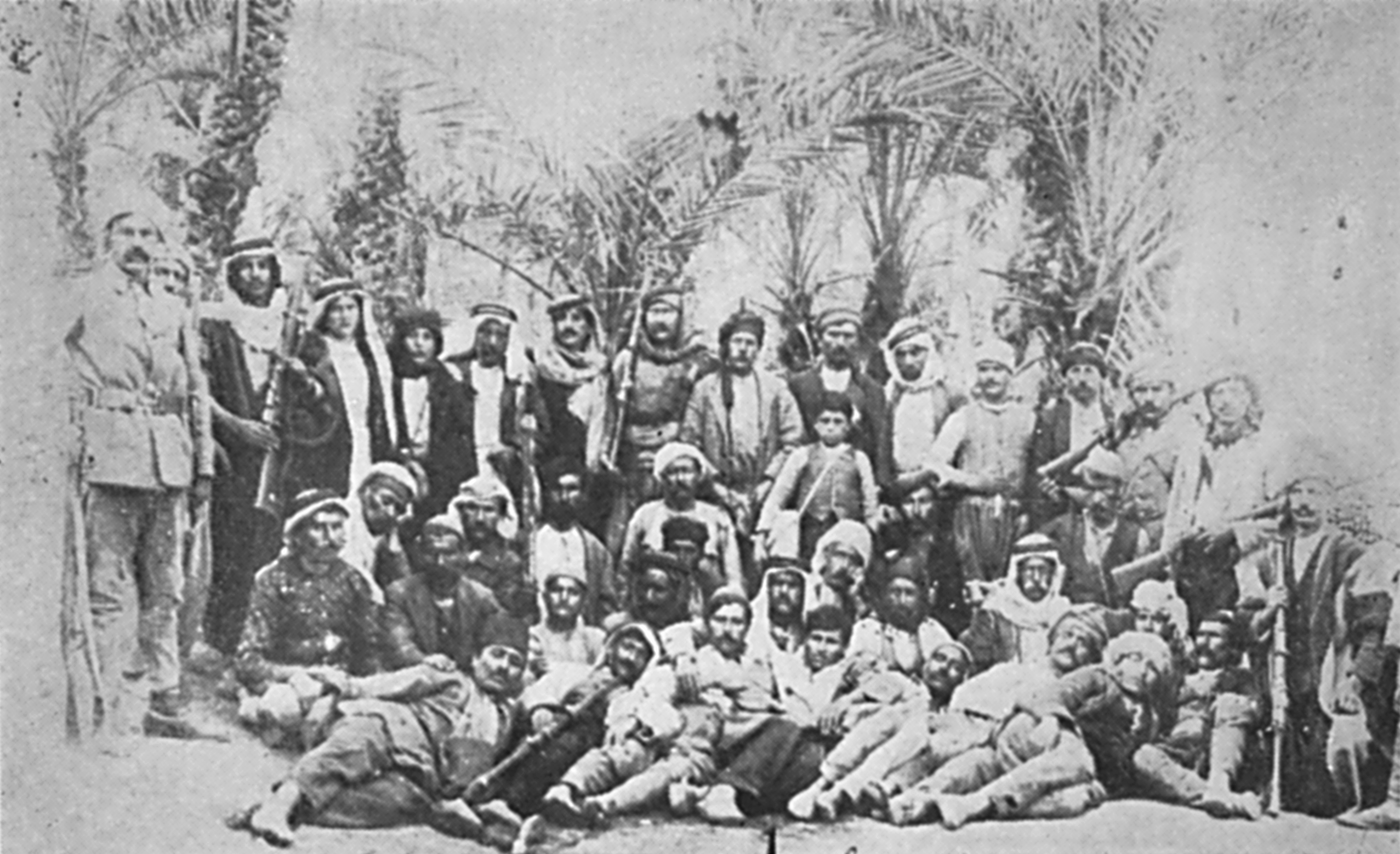
Armenian resistance in Urfa 1915

The majority of the Armenian population resented military resistance against the genocide and hoped instead for survival through displayed loyalty. Important actors of the Armenian community as the church toned down rebellious actions and emphasized patience instead.

In some cases, military resistance was successful:

- the defence of Van, 1915.
- in the village of Adana, which in 1915 circumvented deportation by withdrawing to the mountains of Musa Dagh and withstood the Ottoman forces where they secured the survival of 4,200 villagers.

Other resistance movements were shattered and had the effect of annihilation of entire villages.

Unsuccessful resistance:

- The village of Urfa resisted deportation important the ottoman troops in August 1915 and held out 25 days only to be defeated. Most of the population was killed or conducted suicide.

== Previous military resistance against the Ottoman forces ==
Previous Armenian military resistances against forces of the Ottoman Empire were namely:

- The Sasun resistance in 1894 (Armenian: Սասնոյ առաջին ապստամբութիւն).
- The Zeitun Rebellion from 1895-to 1896, was the Armenian military response to prevent massacres from taking place during the Hamidian massacres.
- The Defense of Van in 1896 was the response by the Armenian population in Van to the Hamidian massacres.
- The Khanasor Expedition on July 25, 1897 (Armenian: Խանասորի Արշաւանքը) refers to the subsequent Armenian militia's response to the aftermaths killings of the Defense of Van.
- The Sasun uprising in 1904 was the resistance of the Armenian militia in the Sassoun region.

== Armenian resistance forces ==
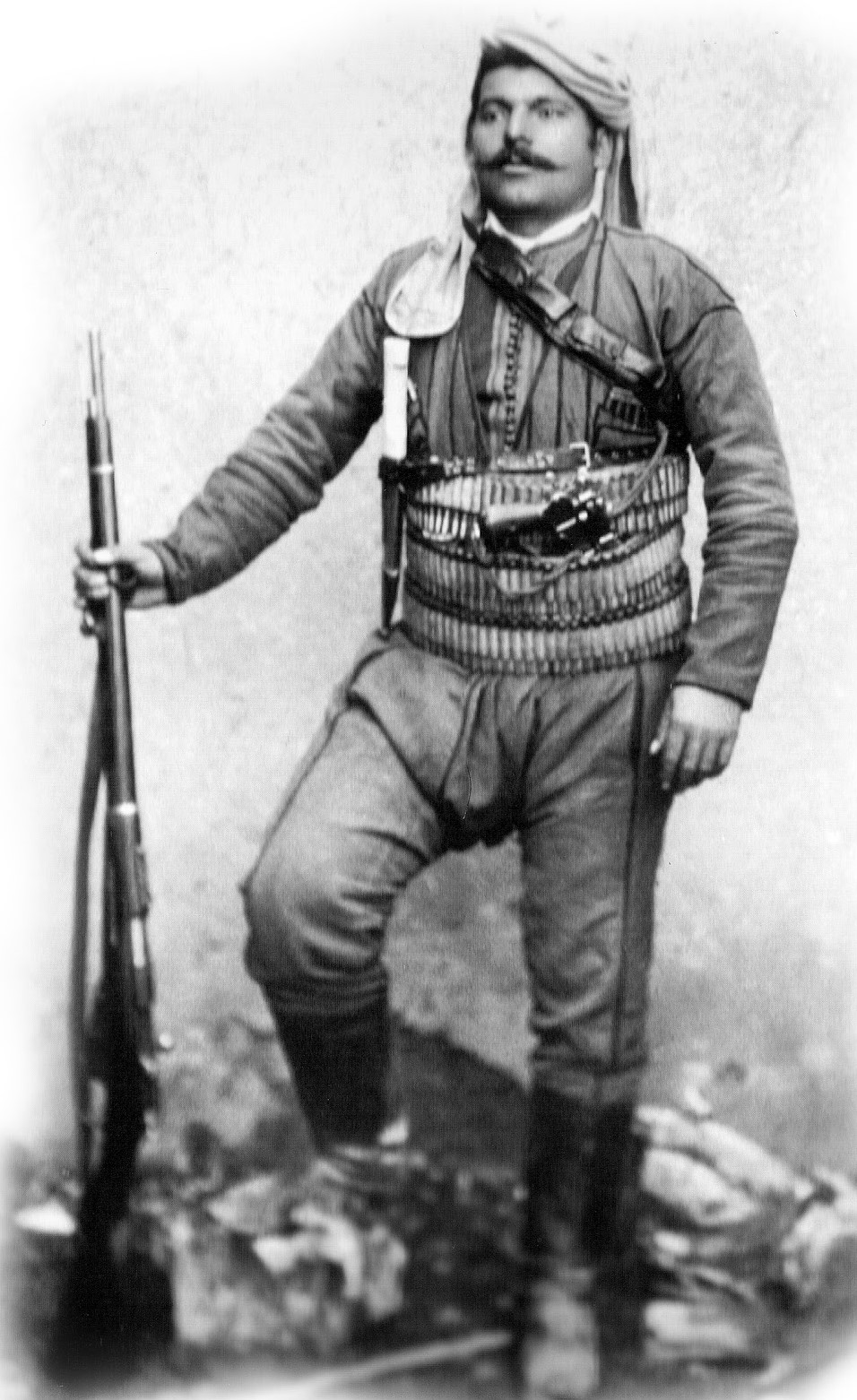
Murad of Sebastia, 1916

The Armenian Resistance Forces (ARF) were established in 1890 out of Armenian volunteers called fedayis and of members of the Armenian national liberation movement. Important members were Murad of Sebastia, and Karekin Pastermadjian. Their main aim was to pose resistance to the Ottoman Forces and to act as the defender of the Armenian nation. The ARF gained major importance during WWI on the Caucasus front, where they joined the Russian Army. Their participation contributed to the defeat of the Ottoman army in January 1916. Primary legions fighting with Russia in the Caucasus were the Armenian volunteer legion, staffed by the Armenian National Bureau (ANB) and through that indirectly through the ARF, dominating the ANB. The number of the fighters reached an estimated amount 5.000.

== Resistance against the Ottoman Empire ==
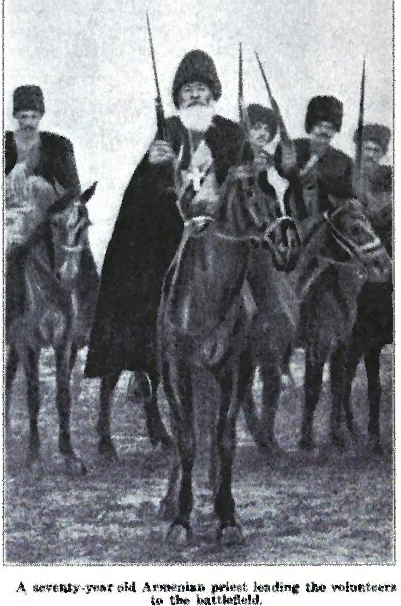
Seventy-year-old priest leading Armenians

=== 1914 ===
- In July 1914, before the World War I, both the Russian and the Turkish governments officially appealed to Armenian organizations (the Armenian National Congress of the Russian Empire and the Armenian National Assembly in the Ottoman Empire) to secure the participation of the Armenians in the military operations against each other. The Ottomans held talks with the Armenian Revolutionary Federation during the Armenian congress at Erzurum. The ARF declared that Armenians should fight for the countries of which they were citizens.
- In August 1914, in the mountains of Zeitun deserters resisting the draft were joined by raiders. This drew the attention of the Ottoman Empire and contributed to Ottoman considerations about rebellion in this region.
  - On 2 November 1914, the Bergmann Offensive was launched. It was the first engagement of the Caucasus Campaign The Russian success was along the Southern shoulders of the offence, where Armenian volunteers occupied Karaköse and Doğubeyazıt.
  - On 29 December 1914, the Ottoman Army was defeated at the Battle of Sarikamish. Armenian contributed on the side of Russian forces to the defeat.

=== 1915 ===
Hunchakian leaders, the Twenty Martyrs

- On 25 March 1915, Armenian deserters in the city of Zeitun, once more resisted the Ottoman army but were defeated.
- In April/May 1915, around 30,000 Armenians in the city of Van, joined by Armenian refugees from surrounding villages, defended themselves during the Defense of Van. While the city withhold the efforts of the Ottoman Army, the surrounding villages were massacred. The initial armed resistance lasted for a period of less than a month. In May, the Russian Caucasus Army entered the city of Van and the Ottoman army retreated. After the ambush, estimated 50% of the population surrounding Van had died.

=== 1916 ===
- 1916, the Battle of Erzincan.

=== 1918 ===
- On 24–26 May 1918, during the Battle of Abaran Armenian forces were able to prevent the penetration of Ottoman forces in the region of Bash Abaran. Both parties had serious losses, serious enough to prevent the Ottoman army from advancing deeper into Armenian territory.
- In September, Murad of Sebastia and his volunteers fought at Battle of Baku, where he died in the fighting.

== Art and culture ==
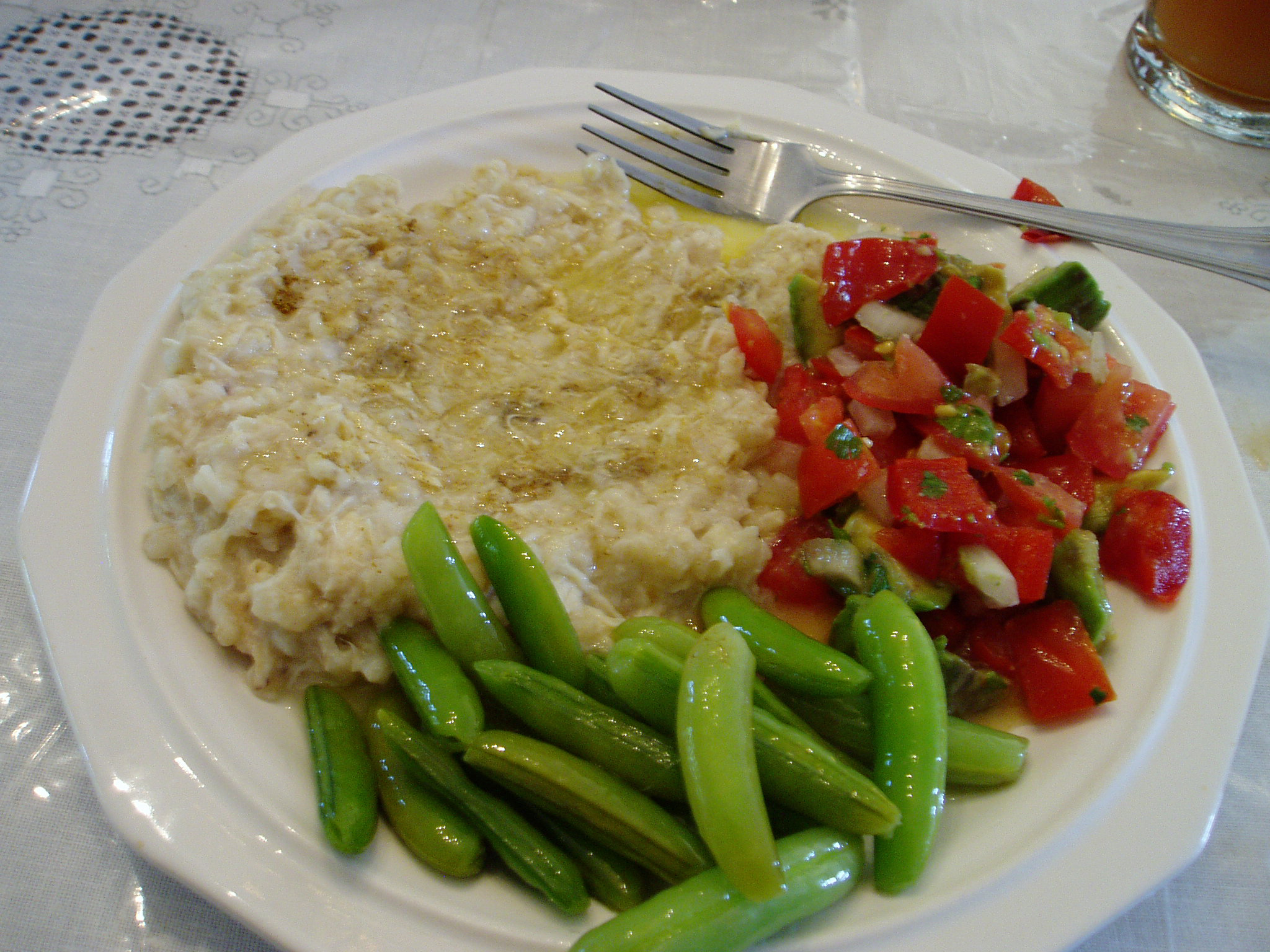
Armenian harissa

Armenian resistance has left a symbolic dish. Harissa (Armenian: Հարիսա) is generally served to commemorate the Musa Dagh resistance. Current practice renamed the dish as "hreesi".

== See also ==
- Greek resistance during the Greek genocide

== Bibliography ==
- Monger, David (2018). "Networking against Genocide during the First World War: the international network behind the British Parliamentary report on the Armenian Genocide". Journal of Transatlantic Studies. 16 (3): 295–316. doi:10.1080/14794012.2018.1482714. ISSN 1479-4012.
- Gunn, Christopher (2019). "In Search of the 'Immortal' Volunteers: The Legacy of Armenian Fedayis on the Caucasus Front, 1914–1916". Journal of Muslim Minority Affairs. 39 (3): 432–455. doi:10.1080/13602004.2019.1654187. ISSN 1360-2004.
- Hovannisian, Richard G. (1997). The Armenian people from ancient to modern times. New York: St. Martin's Press. p. 299. ISBN 978-0-312-10169-5.
- Kaiser, Hilmar (December 2010). "Regional resistance to central government policies: Ahmed Djemal Pasha, the governors of Aleppo, and Armenian deportees in the spring and summer of 1915". Journal of Genocide Research. 12 (3–4): 173–218. doi:10.1080/14623528.2010.528999. ISSN 1462-3528.
- Kaligian, Dikran (September 2014). "Anatomy of Denial: Manipulating Sources and Manufacturing a Rebellion". Genocide Studies International. 8 (2): 208–223. doi:10.3138/gsi.8.2.06. ISSN 2291-1847.
- Kurdoghlian, Mihran (1996). Պատմութիւն Հայոց / Hayots Badmoutioun (in Armenian). Athens, Greece: Hradaragutiun Azkayin Oosoomnagan Khorhoortee. pp. 92–93.
- Morris, Benny; Zeʼevi, Dror (2019). The thirty-year genocide: Turkey's destruction of its Christian minorities, 1894-1924. Cambridge, Massachusetts: Harvard University Press. p. 486. ISBN 978-0-674-91645-6.
- Mouradian, Khatchig (2021). The resistance network: the Armenian genocide and humanitarianism in Ottoman Syria, 1915-1918. Texts and studies in Armenian history, society, and culture. East Lansing: Michigan State University Press. p. 28. ISBN 978-1-61186-385-7.
- Mouradian, Khatchig (July 2016). "Genocide and Humanitarian Resistance in Ottoman Syria, 1915-1916". Études arméniennes contemporaines (7): 87–103. doi:10.4000/eac.1023. ISSN 2269-5281.
- Suny, Ronald Grigor (2015). "They can live in the desert but nowhere else": a history of the Armenian genocide. Human rights and crimes against humanity. Princeton Oxford: Princeton University Press. ISBN 978-0-691-14730-7.
- Chisholm, Hugh (1920). Encyclopædia Britannica (12th ed.). Encyclopædia Britannica Company. p. 198.
