= Satenik Matinian-Arghutian =

Armenian teacher and revolutionary leader

- Born: 24 or 25 September 1874; Gyumri, Shirak, Armenia
- Died: 12 December 1930 (aged 56); Paris, France
- Occupation(s): teacher and revolutionary leader in the Armenian Revolutionary Movement
- Organization: Tabriz Armenian Women's Benevolent Society
- Spouse: Hovsep Arghutian (m. 1899)
- Children: 1

Satenik Matinian-Arghutian (Armenian: Սաթենիկ Մատինեան-Արղութեան, 24 or 25 September 1874 – 12 December 1930), also known as Dzaghig or Miss Flower, was an Armenian teacher and leader in the Armenian Revolutionary Movement.

== Biography ==
Matinian-Arghutian was born on 24 or 25 September 1874 in Gyumri, Shirak, Armenia. She attended the first female gymnasium in Tbilisi.

Matinian-Arghutian became involved in the Armenian revolutionary movement as a teenager as an active member of the group "Young Armenia." She worked as a teacher in Tiflis.

In 1892, Matinian-Arghutian moved from the Caucasus to Tabriz, where she continued her teaching and revolutionary work. She was an early member of organisations which later became the Armenian Revolutionary Federation (ARF) and was the leader of the Tabriz Armenian Women's Benevolent Society. She was one of the more active revolutionaries and was well respected by other activists, encouraging local Armeninan men to allow their wives to join women's revolutionary organisations. Her sister Natalia Matinian was also involved in the revolutionary movement, undertaking secret assignments.

Matinian-Arghutian married fellow Armenian revolutionary Hovsep Arghutian in 1899 in Moscow. He became ambassador of the First Republic of Armenia to Persia. They had one child called Arpik.

Matinian-Arghutian died on 12 December 1930 in Paris, France.
