= Hamazasp Srvandztyan =

Armenian revolutionary

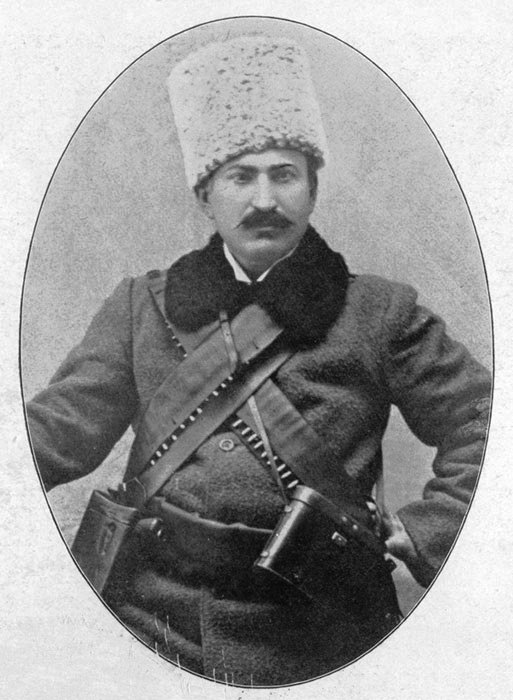
- Born: Hamazasp Srvandztyan; 1873; Van, Ottoman Empire
- Died: 18 February 1921 (aged 47–48); Yerevan, Soviet Armenia
- Military career
- Allegiance: Dashnaktsutyun (1890s–1920); Russian Empire (1914–1917); Republic of Armenia (1918–1920)
- Branch: Russian Armenian Volunteer Corps
- Service years: 1890s–1920
- Nickname: Hamazasp
- Commands: 3rd Armenian volunteer battalion
- Conflicts: Armenian National Liberation Movement; Armenian–Tatar War; World War I; Caucasus Campaign; Battle of Sarikamish; Siege of Van; Battle of Bitlis; Battle of Koprukoy; Battle of Baku; Russian Civil War; May uprising

Hamazasp Srvandztyan (Armenian: Համազասպ Սրվանձտյան; 1873 – 18 February 1921), commonly known as Hamazasp, was an Armenian fedayee military commander and member of the Armenian Revolutionary Federation.

== Early life ==
Hamazasp was born in Van in 1873 and was the nephew of the folklorist Garegin Srvandztiants. Hamazasp was first a member of the Armenakan Party and then the Armenian Revolutionary Federation. After finishing school, he began to learn handicraft as a jeweler and a watchmaker. From an early age he was involved in the Armenian national liberation movement. To avoid persecution by the Ottoman government, he moved to Yerevan, then to Shushi from Van.

He participated in the Armenian–Tatar clashes of 1905–07. Hamazasp was especially notable in the Battle of Askeran Ravine on 22 August 1905, defeating a 200-member Turkish detachment of which only 6 survived. He also organized the defense of the Armenian villagers of the Elisabethpol Governorate. In 1908, the Tsarist government arrested Hamazasp and condemned him to death, but this was replaced by a 15 years of exile to Siberia sentence. In 1913 he escaped from prison and went to Europe, then to Constantinople. At the 8th General Assembly of the ARF party that took place in Karin in 1914, he was strongly opposed to any cooperation with the Young Turks, and largely supported an alliance with the Russian Empire.

== World War I ==
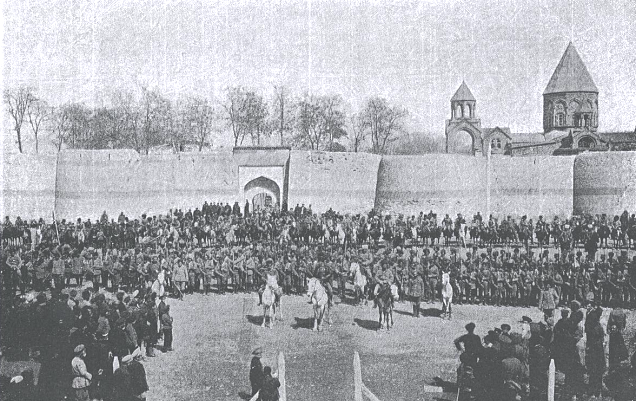
Armenian 3rd battalion cavalry and troops commanded by Hamazasp rallying at Etchmiadzin in 1914

At the beginning of the First World War, Hamazasp participated in the Caucasus Campaign and was appointed Commander of the 3rd Armenian volunteer battalion. He took part in many battles, and also ensured the safe migration of the Armenian population from Basen and Alashkert. He was one of the volunteer liberators of the Siege of Van in May 1915. In June he fought in the Battle of Bitlis, and in October fought in Hizan. After the February Revolution in 1917, Hamazasp was appointed the military police commander of Alashkert, until Russian troops left the Caucasian front.

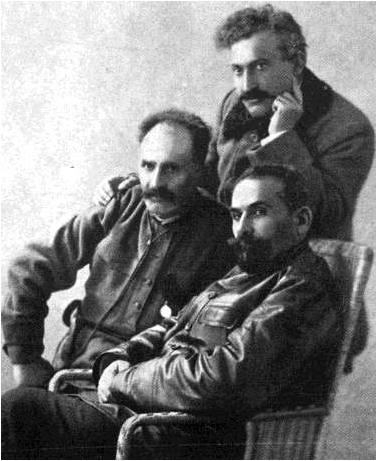
Keri of the 4th battalion, Hamazasp of the 3rd battalion, Vartan of the Ararat regiment

In 1918, he fought for the Baku Commune, as a Commander of the Armenian brigade (3,000 soldiers and officers). He displayed his abilities as an experienced strategist and organizer, playing a decisive role in the operations of Ganja and Yevlakh and for 4 months fought against overwhelming Turkish forces of the Army of Islam. After the fall of the Baku Commune, he went to Iran.

== First Republic of Armenia ==
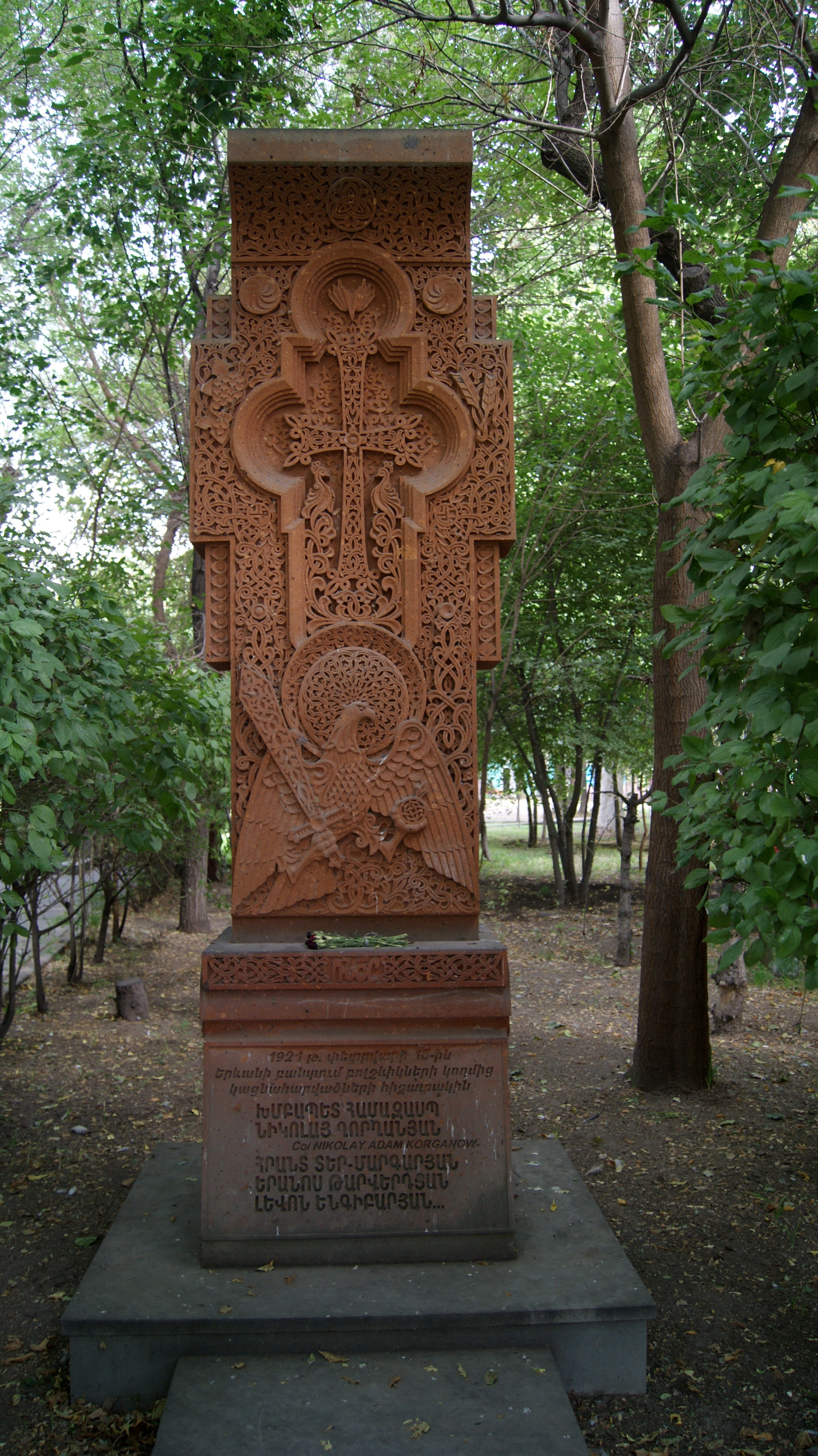

In the autumn of 1918, after the defeat of Turkey in the First World War, Hamazasp came back to Armenia and was appointed military commander of the region of Nor Bayazet. He participated in various actions of defense of the First Republic of Armenia, including the suppression of the May Uprising in 1920.

After the establishment of the Soviet power in Armenia, Hamazasp came to Yerevan with the aim of being helpful for the new government. However, he was arrested by the Bolsheviks and, after two months of imprisonment, he was brutally hacked to death on 18 February 1921, when the February Uprising was on the way.
