= Hovsep Arghutian =

Armenian revolutionary

- Native name: Յովսէփ Արղութեան
- Nicknames: Khanasori Ishkhan (Khanasor Prince); Ishkhan Arghutian (Prince Arghutian)
- Born: 1863; Sanahin, Tiflis Governorate, Russian Empire
- Died: 1925 (aged 61–62) Paris, France
- Allegiance: Dashnaktsutyun (1889–1918); Republic of Armenia (1918)
- Branch: Army
- Service years: 1889—1918
- Conflicts: Armenian National Liberation Movement; Khanasor Expedition; World War I
- Spouse: Satenik Matinian-Arghutian (m. 1899)

Prince Hovsep Arghutian (Armenian: Յովսէփ Արղութեան; 1863 – 1925), also known as Khanasori Ishkhan and Ishkhan Arghutian, was an Armenian military commander and political activist.

== Biography ==
Hovsep Arghutian was born in Sanahin, Tiflis Governorate, Russian Empire to an aristocratic family. His family drew its descent from the Armenian Argutinsky-Dolgorukov noble family. Arghutian graduated from the Nersisian Seminary in Tiflis and was a school teacher in the village of Jalaloghly (now Stepanavan, Armenia).

In the late 1880s, he took up an active role in the Armenian affairs in the Ottoman Empire. In 1889, he made his way into the empire's eastern Anatolian provinces, where he worked with underground revolutionary groups, including the leader Arabo. He participated in the 1897 Khanasor Expedition. Afterward, he was arrested as a Russian citizen by Persian authorities and sent to Vologda, but was soon released. During the 1905-1907 Armenian-Tatar disturbances, he helped organized Armenian self-defense groups. Arghutian led the 7th Armenian Volunteer Battalion during World War I. An ARF member, he became a member of Armenian parliament in 1919, then became the ambassador of the First Republic of Armenia to Persia.

In 1922, he moved to France. He died in Paris three years later.

== Bibliography ==
- Concise Armenian Encyclopedia, Ed. by acad. K. Khudaverdyan, Yerevan, 1990, Vol. 1, p. 389.
- Эдуард Оганесян. Век борьбы. Т.1. Изд. "Феникс", Мюнхен-Москва, 1991, стр.78, 92 (in Russian).
