= Keri (fedayi) =

Armenian revolutionary

Arshak Gavafian
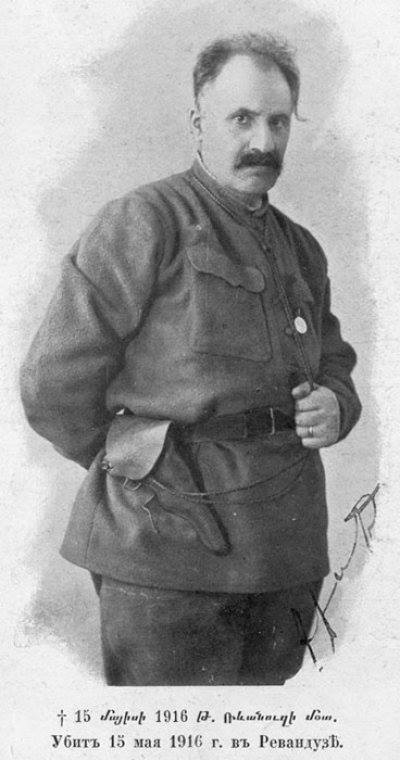
- Born: Arshak Gavafian; 1858; Erzurum, Erzurum Vilayet, Ottoman Empire
- Died: 15 May 1916 (aged 57–58); Rowanduz, Ottoman Empire (present-day Iraq)
- Burial place: Khojivank, Tiflis
- Military career
- Allegiance: Armenian Revolutionary Federation (1880s–1916); Russian Empire (1914–1916)
- Branch: Russian Armenian Volunteer Corps
- Service years: 1880s–1916
- Nickname: Keri
- Commands: 4th Armenian volunteer battalion
- Conflicts: Armenian National Liberation Movement; Sasun Uprising; Persian Constitutional Revolution; World War I; Caucasus Campaign; Battle of Sarikamish; Battle of Koprukoy

Arshak Gavafian, better known by his nom de guerre Keri (1858 – 15 May 1916), was an Armenian fedayee military commander and member of the Armenian Revolutionary Federation.

== Biography ==
Arshak Gavafian was born in Erzurum. He graduated from the local Armenian school. Gavafian had soon taken part in Armenian resistance activity. In 1895, during the Hamidian massacres in Erzurum, Gavafian led an armed group to protect Armenian people in the region and soon became their spiritual leader.

Gavafian moved to Sasun in 1903 and took part in the 1904 Sasun uprising. After moving to Vaspurakan, he was one of the organizers of the Armenian self-defense of Zangezur (in particular, Angeghakot) during the Armenian–Tatar massacres. In the following years he took part in the Persian Constitutional Revolution from 1908 to 1912 and was an associate of Yeprem Khan. After Yeprem's death, Gavafian had his killers liquidated in revenge and took the leadership of the Caucasian troops.

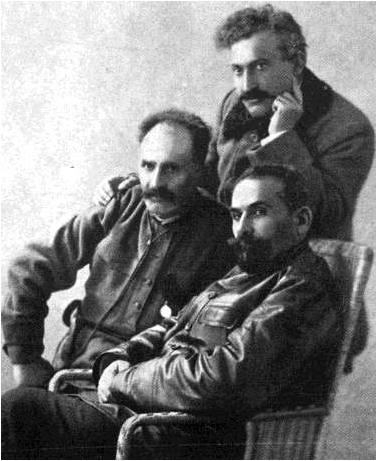
Commanders of the Russian Armenian Volunteer Corps: Keri of the 4th battalion, Hamazasp of the 3rd battalion, Vartan of the Ararat regiment

After the declaration of the First World War, Keri became the commander of the 4th Armenian volunteer battalion of the Imperial Russian Army in 1914. Keri led the volunteer unit in the Battle of Sarikamish at the Barduz pass. Victory was largely determined by the courage of the Armenian soldiers and military genius of Keri, who relieved the besieged Russian and Armenian troops at Rowanduz in 1916.

The battle of Sarikamish, which the British press boomed as an enormous Russian success, was absolutely won by the courage and determination of the Armenian soldiers in the Russian army, and by the military genius of Arshak Gavafian (familiarly known as Keri), whose gallant life was lost in the battle of Rowanduz, where he inflicted another heavy defeat on the Turks and saved the situation. If it were not for Keri and Armenian soldiers, the Sarikamish battle would have been lost, and the Turkish army would have reached Tiflis. - Diana Abgar, On the Cross of Europe's Imperialism, Armenia Crucified

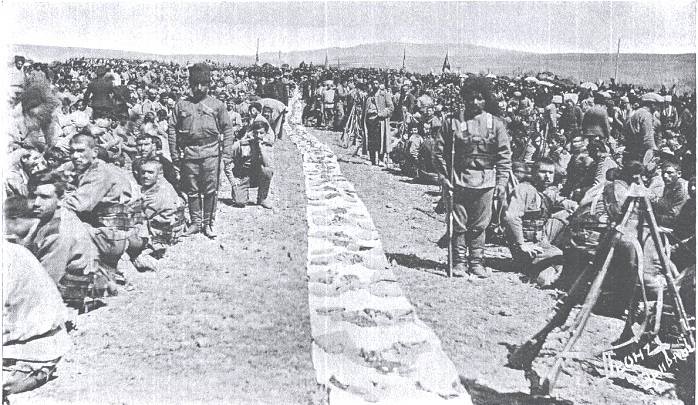
4th Armenian battalion

In 1916, on his way to Mosul from Rowanduz, Keri and his detachment were surrounded and, while trying to get out, he was killed in battle. After his death, his body was transferred to Tiflis and buried within the Armenian Khojivank cemetery.

== See also ==
- Battle of Sarikamish
- Armenian Fedayi
- Battle of Koprukoy
