= Charles van der Leeuw =

Dutch writer (born 1952)

Charles van der Leeuw (born 1952) is a Dutch journalist and author.

== Biography ==
Van der Leeuw was born in The Hague, The Netherlands. Parallel to eight years studies in languages, literature and music, he founded several music and musical theatre groups, starting with a classic rock group called Lincoln, and later an experimental ensemble called De Rode Kapel.

Van der Leeuw started working as an independent reporter on cultural issues in a wide variety of publications in 1977. Ten years later, he settled in war-torn Beirut as an international war correspondent, following a first experience in Iraq in 1985, which resulted in his first book on the Iraq-Iran war. After his kidnapping and release in 1989, his second book Lebanon – the injured innocence came out, followed, in early 1992, by Kuwait burns.

In October 1992, he relocated to Baku, Azerbaijan, as a war correspondent. Storm over the Caucasus on the southern Caucasus geopolitical conflicts came out in 1997 in the Dutch language and two years later in the first English edition. It was followed by Azerbaijan – a quest for identity and Oil and gas in the Caucasus and Caspian – a history, both published in 2000, and Black & Blue, published in Almaty in summer 2003 about the stormy rise of Russia's present-day oil and gas companies.

In 2012, he published a bipartite book about the histories of Kazakhstan and Kyrgyzstan. His latest publication before this work was Cold War II: cries in the desert - or how to counterbalance NATO’s propaganda from Ukraine to Central Asia, published by Hertfordshire Press, England.

Van der Leeuw joined the ill-heeded chorus of critics against the Bretton Wood monetary system which gave, and continues to give, America almost absolute power over all the world economies by its control over commodity and consumer good markets. To defy that monopoly which makes and (mostly) breaks national economies including those of former Soviet republics, he recalls the effects of Colbert’s mercantilism echoed subsequently in Quesnay's physiocratic model which turned France from a third-rate nation into a first-rate economy in the 13th century and which he still considers a viable option to bring today's monetary mechanism down.

== Journalistic career ==
- 1977–1980: Het Vaderland, The Hague - cultural reporting, commenting
- 1980–1984: Haagsche Post, De Tijd a.o. - cultural reporting
- 1984–1987: Elsevier's Weekblad - business, Middle East reporting
- 1987–1989: war correspondent in Beirut, Lebanon for Dutch radio/television VARA, Veronica, Belgian state radio/television BRTN, The Independent (UK) Haagsche Courant (Netherlands), etc.
- September–December 1989: kidnapped, released in Beirut
- 1990–1992: correspondent BRTN, Haagsche Courant, Madrid
- 1992–2000: correspondent various media in Baku, Azerbaijan, covering southern Caucasus
- 2000–2005: editor/deputy director Caspian Business News, Baku/Almaty
- 2005–2009: editor Caspian Publishing House, Almaty
- 2009–2015: correspondent at the Creative Solutions Department of the International Herald Tribune, Almaty office; correspondent/commentator The Times of Central Asia (Bishkek), Kazorld (Almaty), Kazakhstan Newsline (Almaty).

== Selected books ==
- De Golfoorlog, Het Spectrum, Utrecht, 1986. ISBN 90-274-5680-1
- Libanon: de vermoorde onschuld, Jan Mets/Kritak, Leuven/Amsterdam 1990. ISBN 90-5330-002-3
- Koeweit brandt, EPO, Antwerpen 1991. ISBN 90-6445-560-0
- Storm over the Caucasus, Babylon, Amsterdam 1997 (Nederlands); Curzon, Richmond (UK)/St. Martin’s Press (USA) 1998 (in English). ISBN 0-312-22029-4
- Azerbaijan: A Quest for Identity, Curzon, Richmond (UK)/St. Martin’s Press (USA) 1999 (in English). ISBN 0-312-21903-2
- Oil and Gas in the Caucasus - A History, Curzon, Richmond (UK)/St. Martin's Press (USA) 1999 (in English). ISBN 0-7007-1123-6
- Black & Blue – the turbulent formation of new giants: the Russian oil and gas industry, Caspian Publishing House, Almaty 2006 (in English). ISBN 9965-9923-5-5
- Fugitive long-fingered gentry from the plains - banking fraud's impact on economics and financials in Kazakhstan and beyond: the affair of BTA’s former management and affiliated cases, Caspian Library, Almaty 2011 (in English). ISBN 0-312-22029-4
- Kazakhstan/Kyrgyzstan: a tale of two lands, two nations, Caspian Library, Almaty 2012 (in English).
- Haut-Karabagh : la guerre oubliée du monde, l'Harmattan, Paris 2012 (in French). ISBN 9782296993174
- Cold War II: cries in the desert – or how to counterbalance NATO’s propaganda from Ukraine to Central Asia, Hertfordshire Press, London 2012 (in English).
