= Urfa resistance =

Armenian resistance in Urfa against the Ottoman Empire

Urfa resistance Urfa uprising
- Part of Armenian resistance during the Armenian genocide
Date	29 September 1915 – 15/20 October 1915
Location	Urfa, Ottoman Empire

Belligerents
Ottoman Empire	Ottoman Armenians

The Urfa resistance (Armenian: Ուրֆայի հերոսամարտի, Turkish: Urfa İsyanı) was an effort by some Ottoman Armenians in Urfa to defend themselves against the Armenian genocide launched by the Ottoman Empire. The resistance was quelled following German intervention.

== Background ==
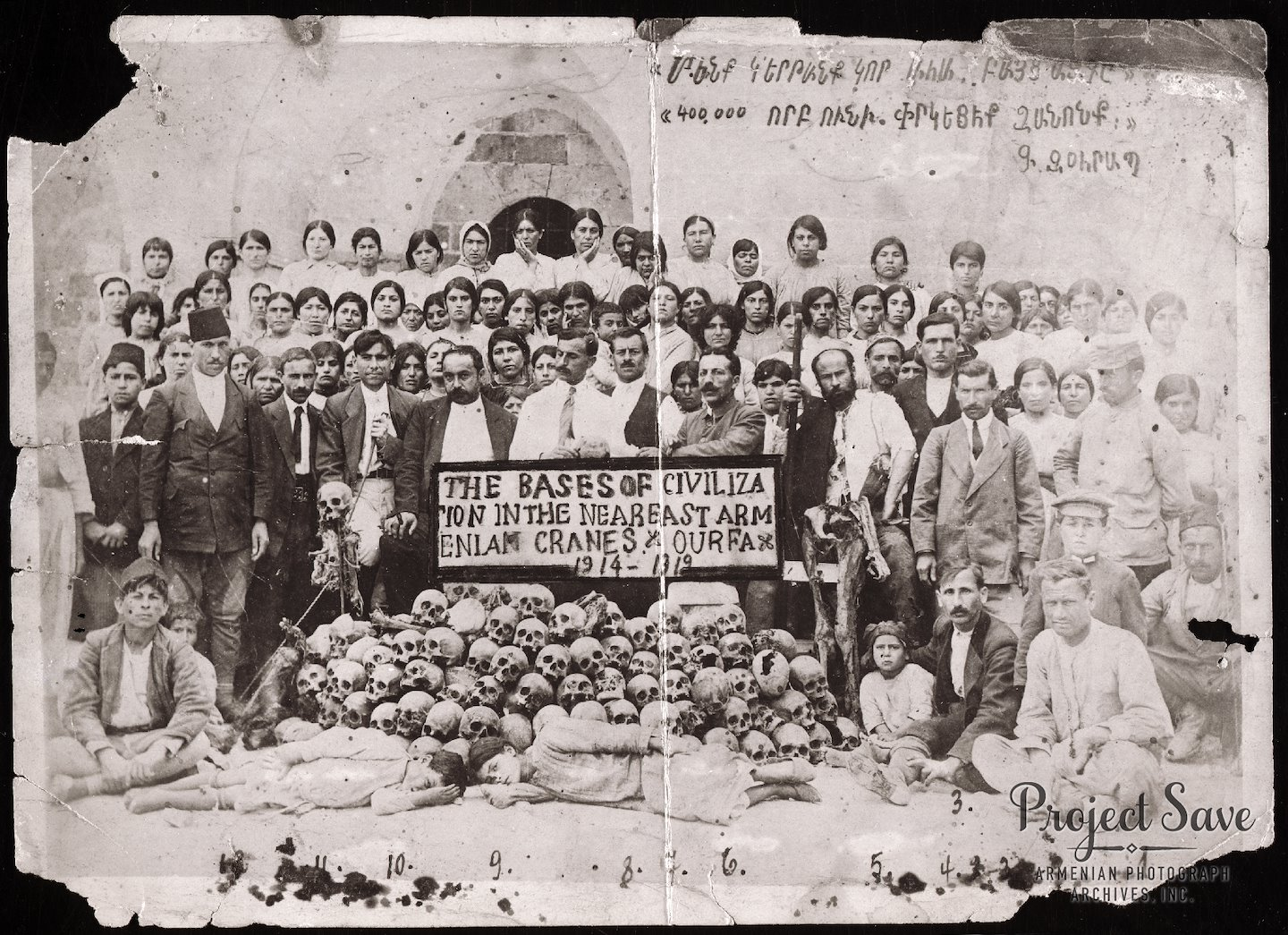
Victims of Armenian Genocide being buried by those who survived in Urfa.

On May 27, 1915, several hundred Armenians were held captive by Ottoman authorities in Urfa. The community held a meeting in order to adopt a solution. The participants thought of many different tactics. Mgrdich Yotneghparian and his partisans were among the few who preferred to fight to the death rather than yield to the Ottomans. The Adana massacre of 1909 had made Yotneghparian increasingly cautious of the new Young Turk government and the Turkish constitution.

In Urfa massacres began in the middle of August; during August 15–19, 400 people were driven outside the town and killed, Armenians in Urfa preferred to put up a resistance, rather than be deported and killed.

== The Rebellion ==
Led by Mgerdich, the resistance of the Armenian fighters in the heavily fortified stone houses began on 29 September and lasted 16 or 21 days and was eventually broken only with the help of a reinforcement contingent of six thousand Turkish troops, reportedly equipped with heavy artillery.

Former Aleppo governor, Mehmet Celal Bey, who was removed from his position because he opposed the deportation of Armenians, commented about the resistance: "Each human has the right to live. A kicked wolf will bite."
