= Defense of Van (1896) =

Armenian resistance during the Hamidian massacres

- Part of Hamidian massacres and Armenian resistance during the Armenian genocide
Date	3–11 June 1896
Location	City of Van, Van Vilayet
Result	Armenians agree to disarm, defenders and additional civilian population massacred.

Belligerents
Ottoman Empire; Kurds	Armenakan Party; Armenians of Van

Strength
Unknown	Unknown

Casualties and losses
Unknown	20,000 massacred 350 hamlets or villages destroyed

The 1896 defense of Van or Van rebellion was an act of self-defense by the Armenian population in Van against the armed forces of the Ottoman Empire in June 1896, during the Hamidian massacres.

== Background ==
The Van region had avoided the earlier stages of the Hamidian massacres in 1895. However, by January 1896 there was increasing violence – a report by the British vice-consul in Van, W. H. Williams, said that many Armenian villages had been looted and "Armenians are everywhere in a state bordering on panic, afraid lest the spring will bring still further disasters". The Ottoman authorities eventually sent an expedition to attack the Armenian population of Van in June 1896.

== Defense and massacre ==
Between 3 and 11 June some six to seven hundred Armenian men defended the Armenian sections of the Aigestan (Garden City) district of the city. After a week of fighting, the sultan sought assistance from the Western powers to end the violence, promising that he would guarantee the lives and safety of the Armenians of Van. After some negotiations, and making clear they had been acting in self-defense in the face of continual massacre, the Armenian defenders agreed to leave for Persia, escorted by Ottoman troops. En route, as nearly 1,000 Armenians marched towards the border, they were massacred by Ottoman troops and Kurdish tribesmen. This was followed by further massacres throughout the Van region. Vice-consul Williams estimated that some 20,000 Armenians had been killed and some 350 Armenian villages destroyed.

== Aftermath ==
In July 1897, an Armenian Fedayee group undertook a revenge attack, known as the Khanasor Expedition, against the Kurdish Mazrig tribe that had been responsible for the massacre of the defenders of Van when they were moving towards the Persian border.

== See also ==
- Defense of Van (1915)
