= Armenian volunteer units =

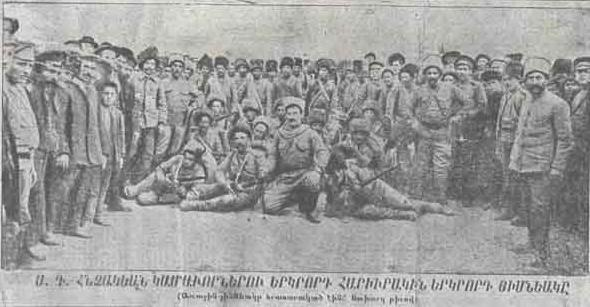
- Armenian volunteers
- Active: 1914–1917
- Country: Russian Empire
- Allegiance: Armenia
- Role: Detachment
- Size: 150,000 troops

Commanders
- Notable commanders: Andranik Ozanian; Drastamat Kanayan; Arshak Gavafian; Hamazasp Srvandztyan; Sargis Mehrabyan

The Armenian volunteer units (Armenian: Հայ կամավորական ջոկատներ Hay kamavorakan jokatner) were units composed of Armenians within the Imperial Russian Army during World War I. Composed of several groups at battalion strength. The Russian-Armenian volunteer units took part in military activities in the Middle Eastern theater of World War I.

== Background ==
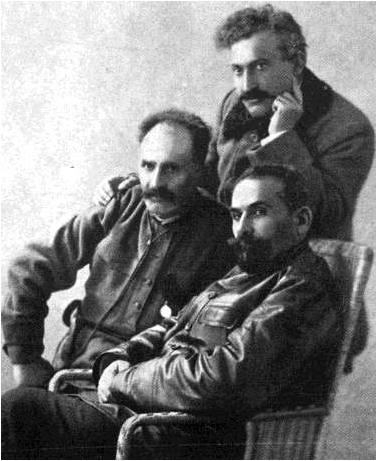
Keri of the 4th battalion, Hamazasp of the 3rd battalion, Vartan of regiment of Ararat

In August 1914, following Germany's declaration of war against Russia, Count Illarion Vorontsov-Dashkov, the Russian Caucasus Viceroy approached Armenian leaders in the Russian city of Tiflis to broach the idea of a formation of a separate fighting corps inside the Russian Army, made up of the Russian Empire's Armenian subjects. Armenians were already being enrolled in the regular Russian army and sent to the Eastern front, but Vorontsov-Dashkov offered to furnish weapons and supplies to outfit four detachments that were envisioned to take part in fighting against the Ottoman Empire (the Ottomans would not enter the war until October that year). His offer was received warmly, and within a few weeks, Armenian volunteers throughout the Caucasus began to enlist. Responsibility for its formation was given to a special committee created by the Armenian Congress of Eastern Armenians, which coordinated its activities from Tiflis, Yerevan and Alexandrapol.

== Establishment ==
The establishment of Armenian volunteer units in the Russian army dates back to the summer of 1914. Count Illarion Ivanovich Vorontsov-Dashkov consulted with the Mayor of Tbilisi Alexander Khatisian, the primate of Tbilisi, Bishop Mesrop Ter-Movsisian, and the prominent civic leader Dr. Hakob Zavriev about the creation of Armenian volunteer detachments. These units would be employed on the Caucasus front in World War I.

The Armenian volunteer units, mostly from the Caucasus region, were impatient to take arms "to liberate their homeland". In several towns occupied by the Russian forces, Armenian students were ready to join the Russian Empire's Armenian volunteer army. Besides the regular soldiers of the Russian Caucasus Army, nearly 20,000 Armenian irregular units expressed their readiness to take up arms against the Ottoman Empire. The size of these units increased during the war and Boghos Nubar gave the summary of these units in a public letter to the Paris Peace Conference, 1919 as 150,000 Armenians in the Russian Empire's volunteer units and around 40,000 Armenian irregular units.

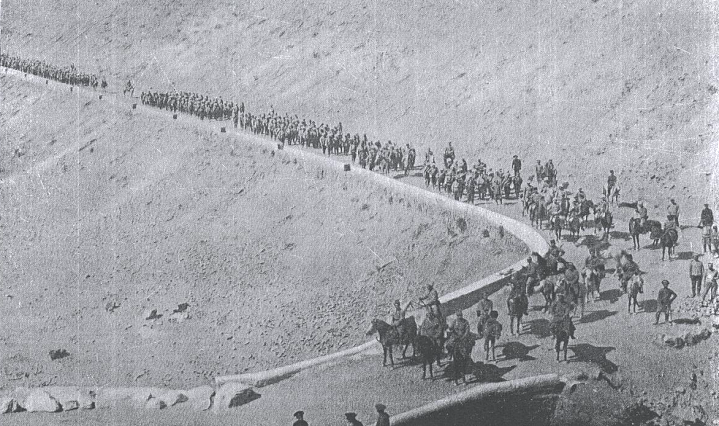
1st. Armenian battalion

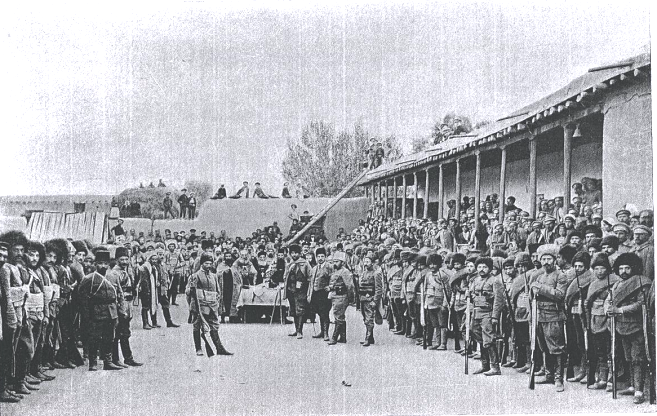
2nd Armenian battalion

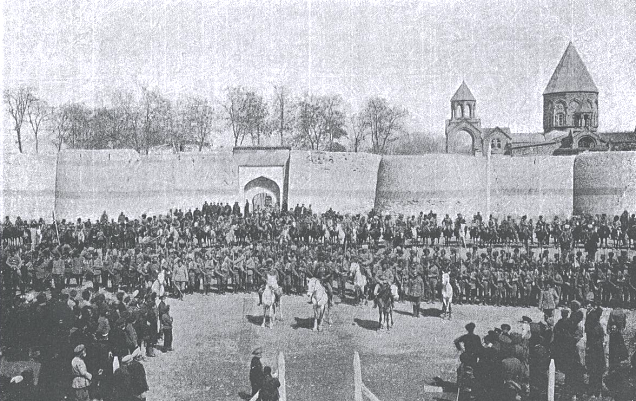
3rd Armenian battalion

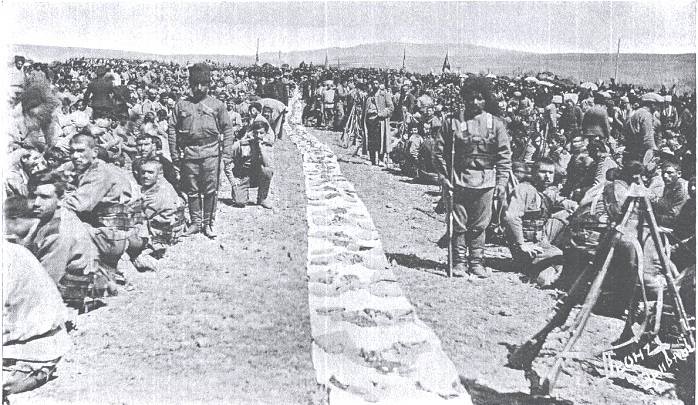
4th Armenian battalion

== Order of Battle, 1914 ==
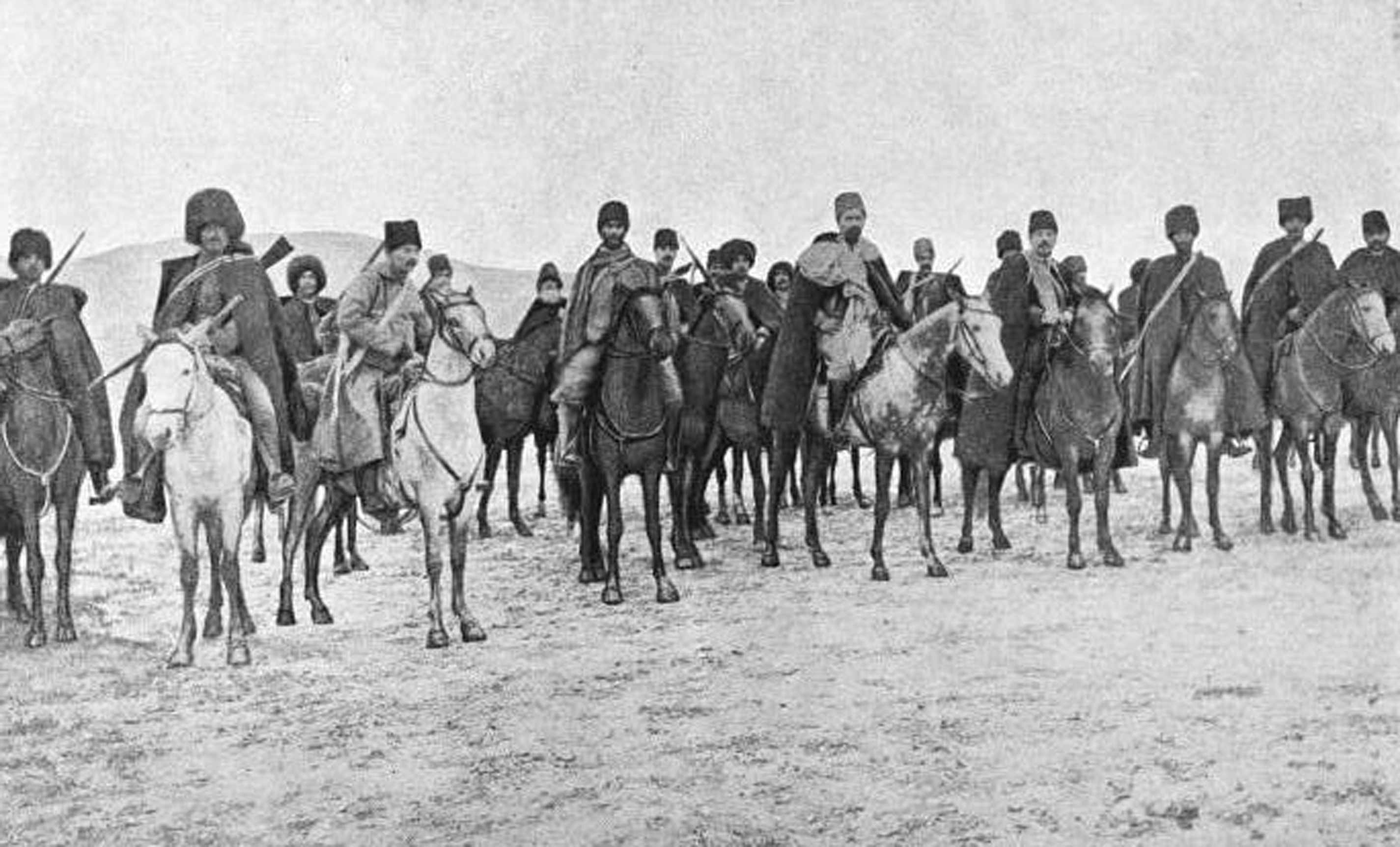
1914, Staff of Armenian volunteers; Khetcho, Dro, and Armen Garo

The acting commander Andranik Ozanian under Viceroyalty of the Caucasus Illarion Ivanovich Vorontsov-Dashkov.

- Armenian volunteer corps
  - 1st battalion (Andranik Ozanian)
  - 2nd battalion (Drastamat Kanayan and Armen Garo)
  - 3rd battalion (Hamazasp Srvandztyan nom de guerre Hamazasp)
  - 4th battalion (Arshak Gafavian nom de guerre Keri)
  - Regiment Ararat (Sargis Mehrabyan nom de guerre Vartan)

Andranik's detachment was assigned to the Persian Campaign along General Tovmas Nazarbekian's forces. The second, third and fourth units were assigned to the Caucasus Campaign. Drastamat Kanayan and Armen Garo directed the 2nd battalion over the offensives around Lake Van (Vaspurakan). The 3rd and 4th battalions commanded by Hamazasp and Keri were assigned to the positions along the Kars Oblast. Enver Pasha's offensive had a great chance of success if all three wings of the Third Army could reach their objectives on time. The Ottoman Tenth Army corps, during its march from Olti to Sarikamish, suffered a delay of 24 hours in the Barduz Pass due to the resistance of the "4th battalion of the Armenian volunteers". This delay enabled the Russian Caucasus Army to concentrate a sufficient force around Sarikamish, resulting in the destruction of the Ottoman Third Army in the Battle of Sarikamish.

== Order of Battle, 1915 ==
The acting commander Andranik Ozanian under Viceroyalty of the Caucasus Nicholas Nikolaevich.

During the siege of Van there were 20,000 Armenian volunteer units serving in the Russian army. The Russian army entered Van on 16 May 1915. Later on 15 October, under heavy fight around the region Lake Van, these battalions had lost five hundred Armenian soldiers and there were more than twelve hundred wounded or missing.

== Order of Battle, 1916 ==
The volunteer detachment contingents, fighting under Armenian commanders, were observed in the Russian Caucasian Army as rifle battalions under Russian officers. Around 1916, more than 1,000 Armenian reserve soldiers quit the Russian army in the Eastern Front and joined the Armenian irregular units (Fedayee).

== Order of Battle, 1917 ==
The Russian Caucasus Front collapsed following the abdication of the Tsar. In 1917, the Armenian Congress of Eastern Armenians asked the Armenian soldiers and officers scattered throughout Russian occupied regions to gradually be brought together. The plan was to mobilize Armenians on the Caucasian front. With that purpose in view, an Armenian Military Committee was formed with General Bagradouni as its president. These Armenian conscripts and volunteers from the Russian Army later established the core of the armed forces of the First Republic of Armenia.

== See also ==
- Armenian fedayi
- French Armenian Legion
