= Khanasor Expedition =

1897 Armenian fedayi raid against the Kurdish Mazrik tribe

- Part of Armenian national movement
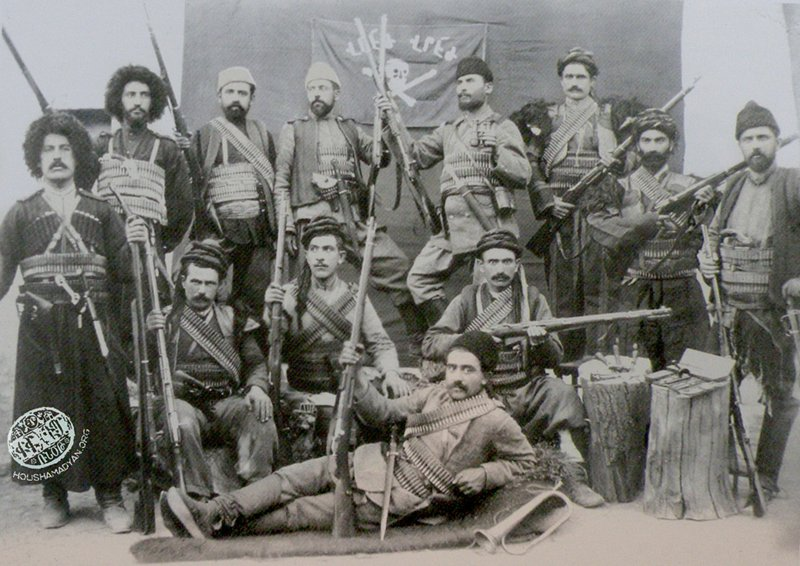
- Armenian fedayis
Date	25–27 July 1897
Location	Plain of Khanasor; Van Vilayet, Ottoman Empire
Result	Armenian victory: Mazrik tribe's influence on the region nullified

Belligerents
Armenian Revolutionary Federation (First Republic of Armenia) Armenian Volunteers	Kurdish Mazrik tribe of Khanasor

Commanders and leaders
Sargis Mehrabyan; Nikol Duman; Nikoghayos Mikaelian	Sharaf beg (surrendered)

Strength
250 fedayees	The entire tribe

Casualties and losses
26	About 200

The Khanasor Expedition (Armenian: Խանասորի արշավանք, romanized: Xanasori aršavank',) was a punitive raid launched by Armenian fedayis against the Kurdish Mazrik tribe on July 25, 1897. In 1896, in the aftermath of the Defense of Van, the Kurdish Mazrik tribe had ambushed and slaughtered many of the Armenian defenders of Van as they were retreating into Persia. The Armenian Revolutionary Federation decided to retaliate for that atrocity, resulting in the Khanasor Expedition.

== Event ==
About a year after the events in Van, the Armenian Revolutionary Federation decided to retaliate and "punish" the Kurdish Mazrik tribe for its role in the Hamidian massacres and its ambush of the defenders of Van. The Mazrik tribe were camped in the fields of Khanasor, near Avarayr. The ARF, with the support of the Hunchakians and the Armenakans, organized an attack on the tribe. The operation was planned by Nikol Duman alongside "Khanasora" Vartan Mehrpanian and Ishkhan Arghoutian, all of whom participated as commanders of the operation. Among the Armenian soldiers also there were disagreements. For their settlement the party sent in Tavriz Harutiun Shahrigian and as a result they come to conclusion of holding an action. On 25 July 1897, at dawn, the 250 Armenian fedayees attacked and killed the fighting men of Mazrik tribe, sparing the women and the children, among whom the Mazrik chief, Sharaf Bey, learned Armenians were coming earlier and managed to escape by wearing women's clothing, leaving the women and children behind. The attack ended on 27 July 1897.

== Results ==
Although ARF founder Rosdom's brother Garo and 25 other fedayees were among the casualties, the Khanasor expedition was a small triumph for the Armenians, both militarily and morally. As a result, Armenians built up their self-confidence; their belief in their ability to defend themselves was now reinforced. To this day, the ARF remembers the event in commemorative ceremonies honouring the expedition as an important event in the history of the Armenian struggle for freedom.

Gurgen Mahari, as part of a critique of the effectiveness of the Armenian Revolutionary Federation, had a character in his novel The Burning Orchards question whether the high moral and strategic significance the Dashnaktsutyun gave to the Khanasor Expedition's results was justified, or whether the expedition, and other acts like the Ottoman Bank siege, were just isolated incidents whose sum total did not relieve the oppression of Armenians in the Ottoman Empire.

== See also ==
- Armenian resistance
- Armenian fedayi
