= Armenian–Tatar massacres of 1905–1906 =

Armenian–Tatar massacres
- Part of Russian Revolution of 1905
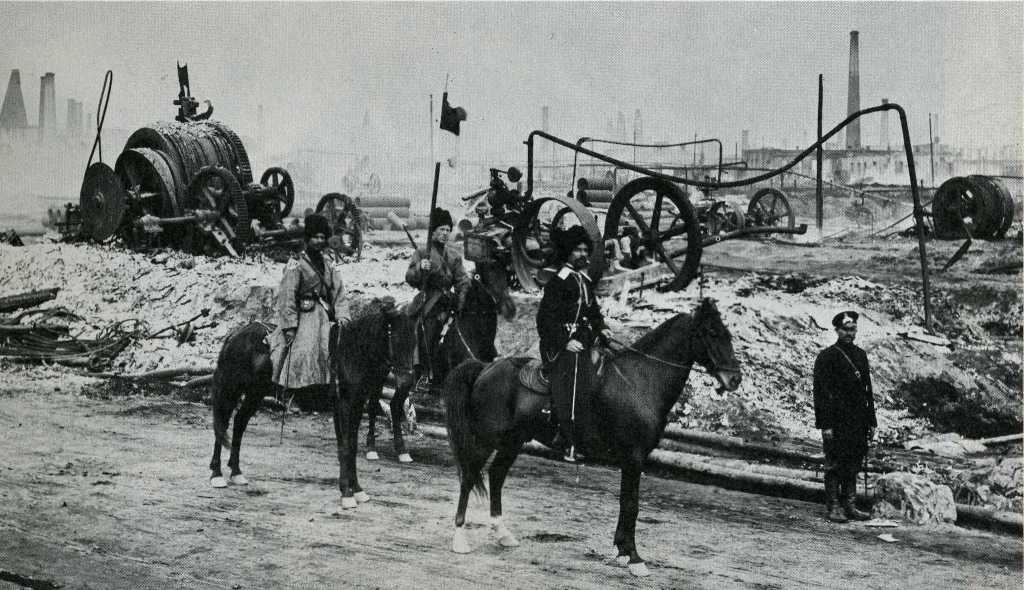
- A Cossack military patrol near the Baku oilfields, ca. 1905.
Date	1905–1906
Location	Caucasus, Russia

Belligerents
Armenian groups: Armenian Revolutionary Federation	Azerbaijani (Caucasian Tatar) groups: Difai Party

Casualties and losses
- 128 Armenian and 158 Azerbaijani (Tatar) villages destroyed 3,100 to at least 10,000 killed

The Armenian–Tatar massacres (also known as the Armenian–Tatar war, the Armenian–Muslim war, Armenian–Azerbaijani war) was the bloody inter-ethnic confrontation between Armenians and Caucasian Tatars, later known as Azerbaijanis throughout the Russian Caucasus in 1905–1906. The massacres started during the Russian Revolution of 1905. The most violent clashes occurred in 1905 in February in Baku, in May in Nakhchivan, in August in Shusha and in November in Elizabethpol, heavily damaging the cities and the Baku oilfields. Some violence, although of lesser scale, broke out also in Tiflis.

The violence led to a sense of distrust and animosity that persisted for many years. This tension largely resulted from the larger political and social issues of the time, rather than any inherent conflict between the Armenian and Tatar peoples.

== Analysis ==
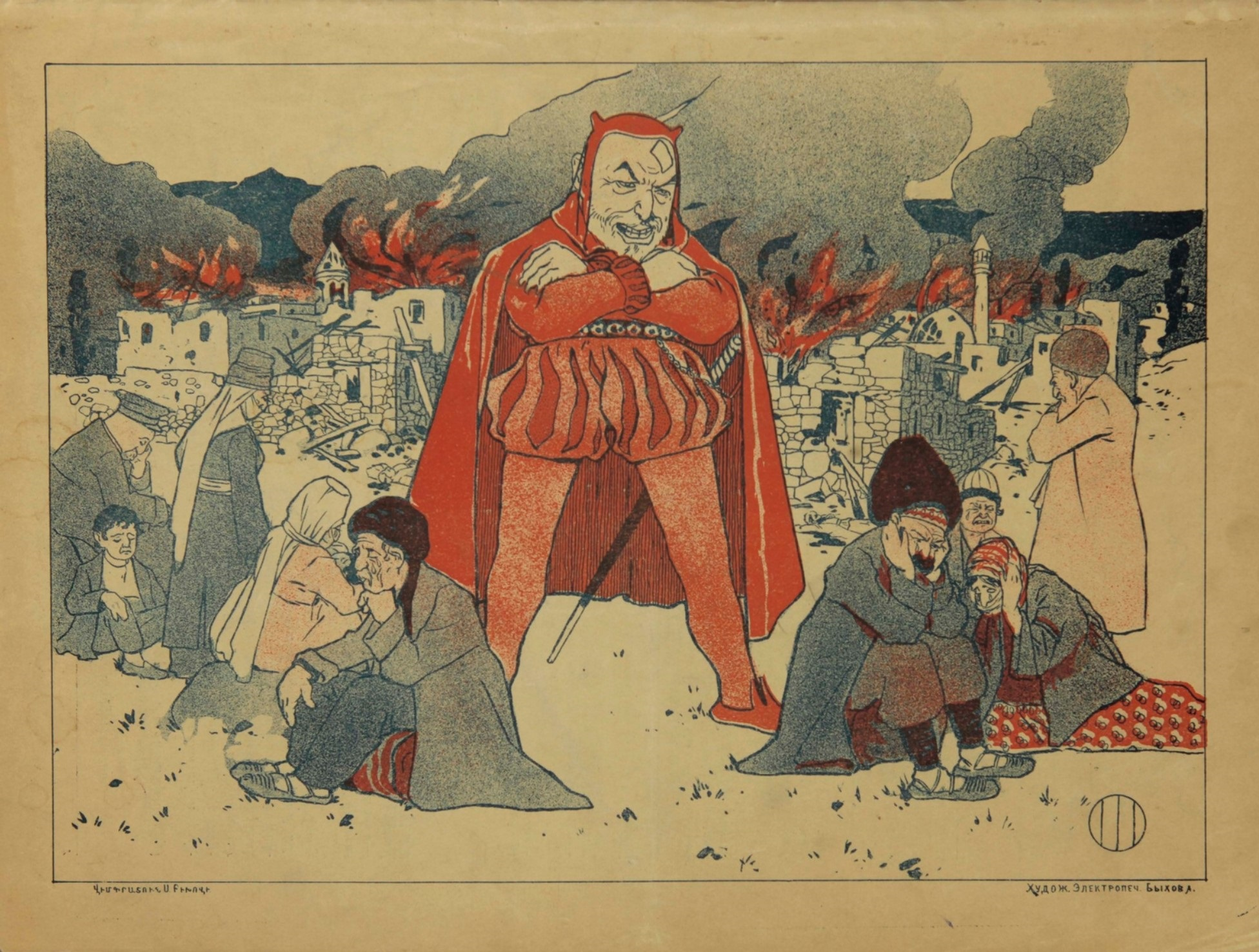
A cartoon from Tbilisi-based Armenian satirical periodical Khatabala shows bitter consequences for both sides

The clashes were not confined to the towns; 128 Armenian and 158 Tatar villages were sacked and ruined. The total number of lives lost ranges is estimated between 3,100 to at least 10,000. Another 15,000 people were uprooted. Swedish Scholar Svante Cornell states that ARF members on the Armenian side were more effective and that the poor Tatar organization lead to more casualties on the Tatar side.

The events of also 1905 convinced Tsar Nicholas that he must reverse his anti-Armenian policies. He replaced the Armenophobe governor Golitsin with the Armenophile governor Count Illarion Ivanovich Vorontsov-Dashkov and returned the property of the Armenian Church. Gradually order was restored and the Armenian bourgeoisie once more began to distance itself from the revolutionary nationalists, Dashnaks and the Armenians sustained more than 75% of the property damage.

At the time of the clashes, the Armenians and Tatars were known for being proficient in each other's languages and mixing between the two communities was common. The destruction of each other's villages and the pogroms in Baku therefore resulted in grave distress both on a local as well as on a global level.

According to historian Sen Hovhannisian, 4,000 people were wounded or killed as a result of the massacres. Moreover, 178 of 182 Armenian shops in Nakhichevan were looted and many Armenian villages were set on fire. Near Tiflis (present-day Tbilisi) on 23–25 November 1905, 500 Armenian volunteers protected the Armenian population consisting of 100,000 from "Tatar robbers".

According to Firuz Kazemzadeh, writing in 1951: "it is impossible to pin the blame for the massacres on either side. It seems that in some cases (Baku, Elizavetpol) the Azerbaijanis fired the first shots, in other cases (Shusha, Tiflis) the Armenians." During the massacres, the government, despite its sufficient strength, did not intervene. Viceroy Vorontsov-Dashkov himself said that government forces had done nothing to prevent the massacres.

According to French writer Claude Anet, who in April 1905 crossed the Caucasus region by automobile, "the many minorities – and, in particular, Azeris (Tatars) and Armenians - resumed ancestral clashes".

He explained that one of the reasons that the Armenians; whether they formed the trading class, peasants of industrialists; were not liked by the Muslims or the Eastern Orthodox Georgians was because they were Oriental Orthodox Christians (they formed a separate Church whose Catholicos resided in Etchmiadzin, near Yerevan).

The Armenians faced accusations of "getting rich quickly at the expense of the populations in the midst of which they live and excelling in the money business like the Jews". They were universally disliked by the Government and the other ethnic groups in the Caucasus such as Tatars, Georgians, Kurds and Circassians and that they used "bombs for defence instead of hand-to-hand combat".

In government circles, there is a belief that the Armenian secret committees are the instigators of the political unrest in the Caucasus.

He stated that the Armenians have the most to suffer from anarchy in the Caucasus and that it would be truly inexplicable that the "intelligent and wise" Armenians would perpetuate a state of unrest that is more harmful to them than to any other people. The Armenians, who formed the active and commercial class would have the most to lose from strikes, economic unrest, massacres and looting.

They instead have an interest in the country being appeased and for the order be restored. They wanted a just and strong political power that protects them as the current government mistreated them. Any intelligent Russian would rejoice with them at the end of the autocratic and bureaucratic regime.

They were as anti-government as any other group in Russia then. And in addition to the causes of discontent that are common to all Russians, they have special reasons for being dissatisfied with the present state of affairs. They value their lives, and the government lets them be massacred; then the government confiscated the property of their Church and closed their schools.

It is obvious that it is not by measures of this kind that the government will rally the Armenians. And they in turn accuse the government not only of not protecting them, but also of inciting the Tatars against them

He stated that the Russian does nothing, it is the weakest, most powerless government in Europe. Its inertia is such that it is accused of having a secret and unavowed policy of setting race against race and of allowing those it considers its own enemies (the Armenians and the Tatars) to destroy each other.

The French writer Claude Anet also wrote that he was certain that "for a long time a Russian policy was carried out in the Caucasus against the Armenians. They make the mistake of being intelligent. Nothing makes a despotic government tremble like intelligence. Against the Armenians, Russian policy has aroused the Tatars, who are not suspected of intellectualism."

== The Massacres ==
=== In Baku ===
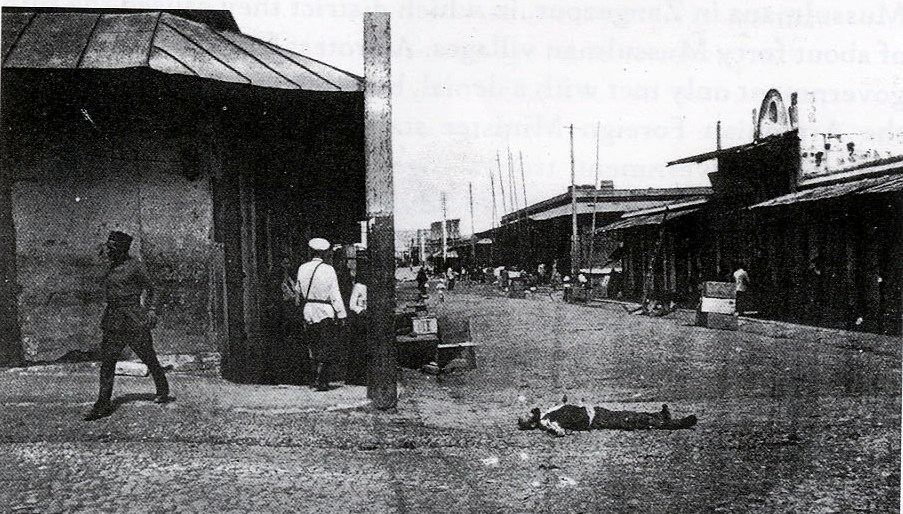
A Tatar victim of the massacres in Baku

Svante Cornell, a Swedish scholar from Stockholm-based Institute for Security and Development Policy, Central Asia-Caucasus Institute & Silk Road Studies Program (CACI) and American Foreign Policy Council, in his "Small nations and great powers: a study of ethnopolitical conflict in the Caucasus" provides various sources that give conflicting accounts on the Baku events.

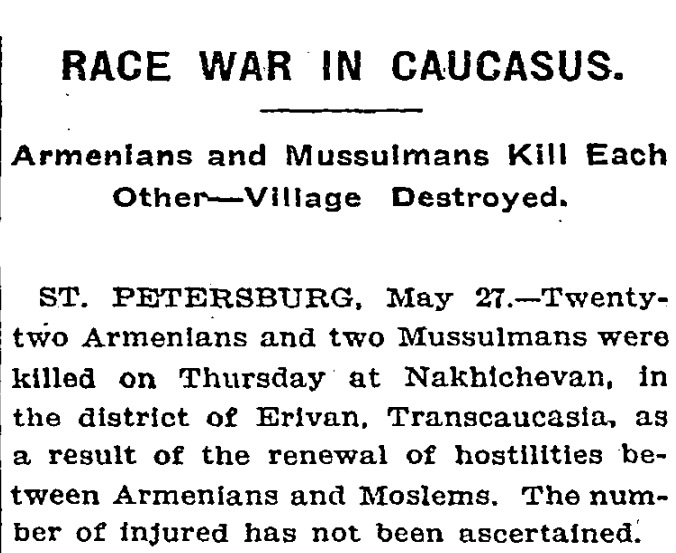
New York Times coverage of the massacres, May 1905

Sources such as British historian Christopher J. Walker (the author of Armenia: The Survival of a Nation, Italian historian Luigi Villari and Lebanese-Armenian historian Hratch Dasnabedian, have argued that the Azeris provoked the fighting, leading to a strong Armenian response. In Villari's view, Tatars had started the conflict by killing numerous unarmed Armenians in February 1905 causing a strong response in the Armenian community. Dasnabedian wrote that the Azeris, ‘free to massacre with impunity’, ‘unleashed a war against the Armenians, with a clear intention to massacre, pillage, and destroy, killing unarmed Armenians in February 1905 in Baku, and later moving to other cities including Karabakh', which resulted in a response from the Dashnaks who managed to ‘stop the original momentum of the armed and destructive Azeri mobs’ and even ‘counterattack and sometimes severely punish’ the Azeris.

Georgian revolutionary Filip Makharadze, gives the number killed in Baku in February, 1905, as more than 1,000, most of whom were Armenians.

Charles van der Leeuw, a Baku-based Dutch correspondent known for stressing the need for insight to “the other side of the story”, claimed that the riots started with the killing of an Azeri schoolboy and a shopkeeper in Baku, followed by an Azeri mob's march on the Armenian quarters of Baku, and 126 Azeris and 218 Armenians killed within four days. According to the Baku Statistical Bureau, 205 Armenians and 111 Tatars were killed in the clashes, of which 9 were women, 20 were children, and 13 were elderly, along with 249 wounded.

=== In Nakhichevan and Shusha ===
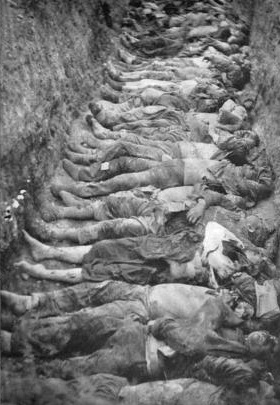
The corpses of Armenians killed in the May massacre in Nakhchivan

After the Baku clashes, Muslim communities in the Nakhchivan district began smuggling consignments of weapons from Persia. By April, murders of Armenians in the district began to assume alarming proportions and the Armenian community applied to the Russian authorities for protection. However, Luigi Villari describes the district's governor as "bitterly anti-Armenian" and the vice-governor in Yerevan (referring to Maksud Alikhanov-Avarsky, the Sunni Moslem Avar vice-governor of the Erivan Governorate) as an "Armenophobe".

On 25 May, acting on a previously arranged plan, bands of armed Tatars attacked the market area in the town of Nakhchivan, looting and burning Armenian businesses and killing any Armenians they could find. Approximately 50 Armenians were murdered and some of the Armenian shopkeepers were burnt alive in their shops. On the same day, Tatar villagers from the countryside began attacking their Armenian neighbours. Villari cites official reports mentioning that "out of a total of 52 villages with Armenian or mixed Armenian–Tatar populations, 47 were attacked, and of that 47, 19 were completely destroyed and abandoned by their inhabitants. The total number of dead, including those in Nakchivan town, was 239. Later, in a revenge attack, Armenians attacked a Tatar village, killing 36 people".

The situation in Shusha was different than in Nakhchivan. According to the journalist Thomas de Waal, out of the 300 killed and wounded, about two-thirds were Tatars as the Armenians were better shooters and enjoyed the advantage of position.

=== In Ganja ===
Prior to the Armenian–Tatar massacres, Ganja, known to Armenians as Gandzak (Armenian: Գանձակ]) had a sizable Armenian population.

== See also ==
- Armenia–Azerbaijan relations
- List of Armenian massacres
- List of massacres of Azerbaijanis

== Bibliography ==
- Əhməd, Dilqəm (2018). Bir ildən yüz ilə. Baku: TEAS Press. ISBN 978-9952-310-47-4.
- Cornell, S. (2005). Small Nations and Great Powers: A Study of Ethnopolitical Conflict in the Caucasus. London: Routledge Curzon. ISBN 9780700711628.
- De Waal, Thomas (2004). Black Garden: Armenia and Azerbaijan Through Peace and War. NYU Press. ISBN 978-0-8147-1945-9.
- Swietochowski, Tadeusz (1985). Russian Azerbaijan (1905-1920): the shaping of a national identity in a Muslim community. Cambridge University Press.
- Villari, Luigi (1906). Fire and Sword in the Caucasus. London: T. F. Unwin. ISBN 0-7007-1624-6.
- Kazemzadeh, Firuz (1951). The Struggle for Transcaucasia (1917–1921). New York City: Philosophical Library. OCLC 1943521.
