= Nematabad =

Nematabad, Nemat Abad, Ne'mat Abad or Na`matabad (Persian: نعمت آباد, lit. 'Place (of) Blessing') are transliteration variants of a common Persian language place name. It may refer to:

== Azerbaijan ==
- Nemətabad, Yevlakh Rayon
- Aşağı Nemətabad, Agdash Rayon
- Yuxarı Nemətabad, Agdash Rayon

== Iran ==
- Nematabad, East Azerbaijan
- Nematabad, Arsanjan, Fars province
- Nematabad, Jahrom, Fars province
- Nematabad, Kazerun, Fars province
- Nematabad, Marvdasht, Fars province
- Nematabad, Hamadan
- Nematabad, Fahraj, Kerman province
- Nematabad, Rafsanjan, Kerman province
- Nematabad, Rigan, Kerman province
- Nematabad, Sirjan, Kerman province
- Nematabad, Kurdistan
- Nematabad, Lorestan
- Nematabad, Chalus, Mazandaran province
- Nematabad, Nur, Mazandaran province
- Nematabad, Tonekabon, Mazandaran province
- Ne'mat Abad Metro Station, of the suburb of Ne'mat Abad, District 19 of the city Tehran
