= Yenikend =

Yenikend or Yenikənd or Yenikänd or Yenikand or Yenik’end or Yengikend (Azerbaijani and Turkish for "new village") may refer to:

- Aşağı Kəsəmən, Azerbaijan
- Yenikənd, Agdash, Azerbaijan
- Yenikənd, Agsu, Azerbaijan
- Yenikənd, Gadabay, Azerbaijan
- Yenikənd, Goranboy, Azerbaijan
- Yenikənd, Goychay, Azerbaijan
- Yenikənd, Kalbajar, Azerbaijan
- Yenikənd, Khojavend, Azerbaijan
- Yenikənd, Kurdamir, Azerbaijan
- Yenikənd, Nakhchivan (disambiguation)
  - Danyeri, Azerbaijan
  - Kiçikoba, Azerbaijan
- Yenikənd, Neftchala, Azerbaijan
- Yenikənd, Oghuz, Azerbaijan
- Yenikənd, Qabala, Azerbaijan
- Yenikənd, Quba, Azerbaijan
- Yenikənd, Sabirabad, Azerbaijan
- Yenikənd, Salyan, Azerbaijan
- Yenikənd, Samukh, Azerbaijan
- Yenikənd, Shamakhi, Azerbaijan
- Yenikənd, Siazan, Azerbaijan
- Yenikənd, Tartar, Azerbaijan
- Yenikend, Zangilan, Azerbaijan
- Yenikend reservoir, Azerbaijan
- Yenikend Hydroelectric Power Station, Azerbaijan
- Yenikend, Iran, near Tabriz
