= Nemətabad, Agdash =

Nemətabad, Agdash may refer to:

- Aşağı Nemətabad
- Yuxarı Nemətabad
