= Glak =

Glak (Armenian, from Middle Iranian *gilak or *gulak "little flower") may be:

- Zenob Glak
- Saint Karapet Monastery, a 4th-century monastery of Taron, is also known as Glak Monastery, after Zenob Glak
- Glak (Cylaces), a 4th-century Armenian Grand Chamberlain (hayr mardpet)
