= Kevork Chavush =

Armenian fedayi leader (1870–1907)

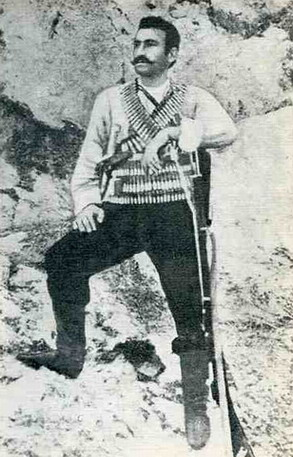
- Chavush, taken in 1904 by Vahan Papazian (Goms) on Aghtamar Island, just before the meeting of fedayees
- Born: Kevork Ghazarian; 1870; Mktink, Bitlis Vilayet, Ottoman Empire
- Died: 28 May 1907 (aged 36–37) near Sulukh, Bitlis Vilayet, Ottoman Empire
- Military career
- Allegiance: ARF
- Service years: 1890–1907
- Nicknames: The Lion of Mountains (Սարերու Առիւծ/Սարերու Ասլան); Sarhad
- Conflicts: Armenian National Liberation Movement; 1894 Sasun Resistance; Battle of Holy Apostles Monastery (1901); 1904 Sasun Uprising; Battle of Sulukh †

Kevork Ghazarian (Armenian: Գէորգ Ղազարեան; 1870 – 28 May 1907), commonly known as Kevork Chavush or Gevorg Chaush (Armenian: Գէորգ Չաւուշ or Գևորգ Չաուշ), was an Armenian fedayee leader in the Ottoman Empire and a member of the Armenian Revolutionary Federation.

Kevork Chavush attained a legendary status during his lifetime for his extraordinary daring and valor in defense of the Armenian peasantry against harassment by marauding Turkish and Kurdish forces. He was the undisputed leader of Armenian revolutionary forces in the region of Taron-Sasun from 1904 until his death in 1907 after being wounded in a battle with the Ottoman army. Kevork's actions earned him the moniker "Lion of the Mountains" (Armenian: Սարերու Ասլան).

== Early life ==
Kevork Chavush was born Kevork Ghazarian (although his surname is given as Adamian or Melkonian in various sources) to a family of hunters in the region of Sasun, in the village of Mktink of the Psank (Psanats) district. His exact date of birth is not known, but he is believed to have been born around 1870. He received his education at the school of the Arakelots Monastery, where he met Arabo (Arakel Mkhitarian), one of the first fedayee leaders. He left school to join Arabo's band of fighters. After Arabo was arrested, Kevork tracked down Arabo's betrayer and assassinated him. From 1885 to 1888, he travelled to Aleppo and found residence there. He worked to raise enough money to buy a rifle. He returned to Taron in 1890 to join his friend Hampartsoum "Murad" Boyadjian's group of Armenian fighters with the aim of defending Armenian-populated villages from Hamidian persecutions.

== Revolutionary activities ==
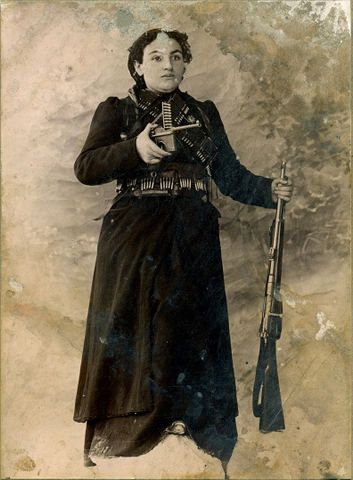
Heghine, wife and widow of Kevork Chaush, 1910

In 1893, Gevorg took part in fighting which had erupted at Talvorik and was quickly noticed as a great soldier. A year later, he participated in the Sasun Resistance against Sultan Abdul Hamid II's persecution of Armenians. During the battle, Gevorg was captured and sentenced to 15 years of imprisonment. He managed to escape from jail 2 years later and fled to the mountains of Sasun, where he joined the Armenian Revolutionary Federation (Dashnaktsutyun) political party with his friends and conducted revolutionary activities targeting Turkish officials. During his career as a fedayee fighter, Gevorg worked with leaders Serob Aghpyur, Gurgen (Baghdasar Malian) and later Andranik Ozanian. During Gevorg's time with Serob Aghpyur's group, Gevorg's uncle ran into trouble with the guerrillas when he kidnapped a woman from a different Armenian village. The case was brought to Serob Aghbyur, who judged Gevorg's uncle to be guilty and ordered Gevorg to execute his uncle and his uncle's wife. Gevorg carried out Serob's orders but suffered from a severe depression afterwards and isolated himself in order to grieve the loss of his uncle. Gevorg left Serob's fedayee group after this incident.

After Serob's death in 1900, Gevorg and Andranik killed Serob's murderer Khalil Pasha and the Armenians who informed on him.

In 1901, Gevorg fought alongside Andranik at the Battle of Holy Apostles Monastery, where a small group of fedayee repelled a much larger Turkish force. That same year, he also took command in battles at Berdak and Norshen. Gevorg later participated in the Second Sasun Resistance in 1904.

Afterwards, he crossed into the region of Vaspurakan (Van) with Andranik and Hampartsoum Boyadjian, but desired to return to Sasun and did so shortly after. He led the Armenian forces in Taron-Sasun from 1904 to 1907, when some of his most famous exploits occurred.

In the fall of 1905, Gevorg married Eghso (Heghine), the daughter of a village chief he had fallen in love with seven years earlier but had not been able to marry because of his revolutionary activities. Gevorg and Eghso had one son together named Vartkes.

Kevork was known to have good relations with some Kurdish leaders of the region. He tried to persuade them not to obey the orders of Sultan Abdul Hamid, who enlisted many Kurds into his Hamidiye regiments. This was in vain as the Kurds ended up not joining the Armenian revolutionaries.

Although his daring actions made him a legend among the local Armenians and Kurds, some of Kevork's men began to oppose his impulsive and reckless behavior. At the Fourth World Congress of the Armenian Revolutionary Federation held in April 1907, Kevork was elected a member of the Sasun-Vaspurakan Responsible Body, which directed all of the party's military and revolutionary activities in the Armenian provinces of the Ottoman Empire.

== Death ==
Kevork and his men came to the village of Sulukh in Mush on 25 May 1907 and were joined by other fedayee the next day. On 27 May, they were attacked by a large Turkish force and a battle ensued. Although the badly outnumbered group of 84 fedayee killed more than 120 Turkish soldiers and their commander Keoseh Binbashi, Kevork lost consciousness after being wounded and was carried away by his comrades and the villagers of Sulukh. His comrades left him under a bridge on the shore of the Aratsani River and told some villagers from Sulukh to watch over him. The next morning, on 28 May 1907, Kevork was found by a Kurdish chieftain named Zaynal Bek and died of his wounds shortly after asking for water. His body was later found by Turkish soldiers who transported Kevork's corpse to Mush city, where the Armenian population mourned him for three days and buried him in an Armenian cemetery in the Kogh neighborhood of the town.

== Legacy ==
Like many other fedayee leaders, Kevork entered the Armenian popular consciousness as a national hero and remains revered to this day. A number of novels and popular songs have been written about him. The Kevork Chavoush Museum is located in the village of Ashnak.

== Gallery ==
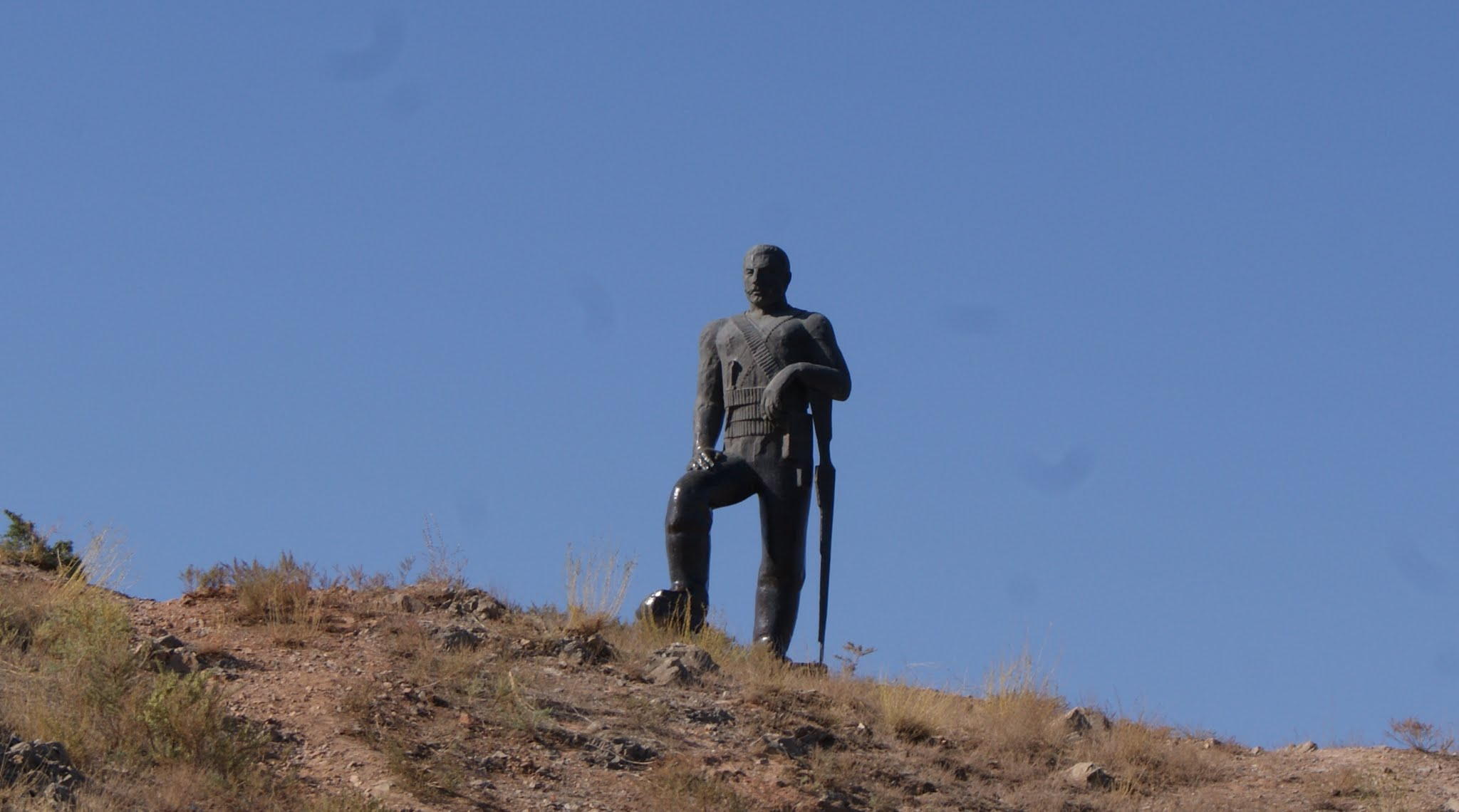
Statue of Kevork Chavush near Khor Virap

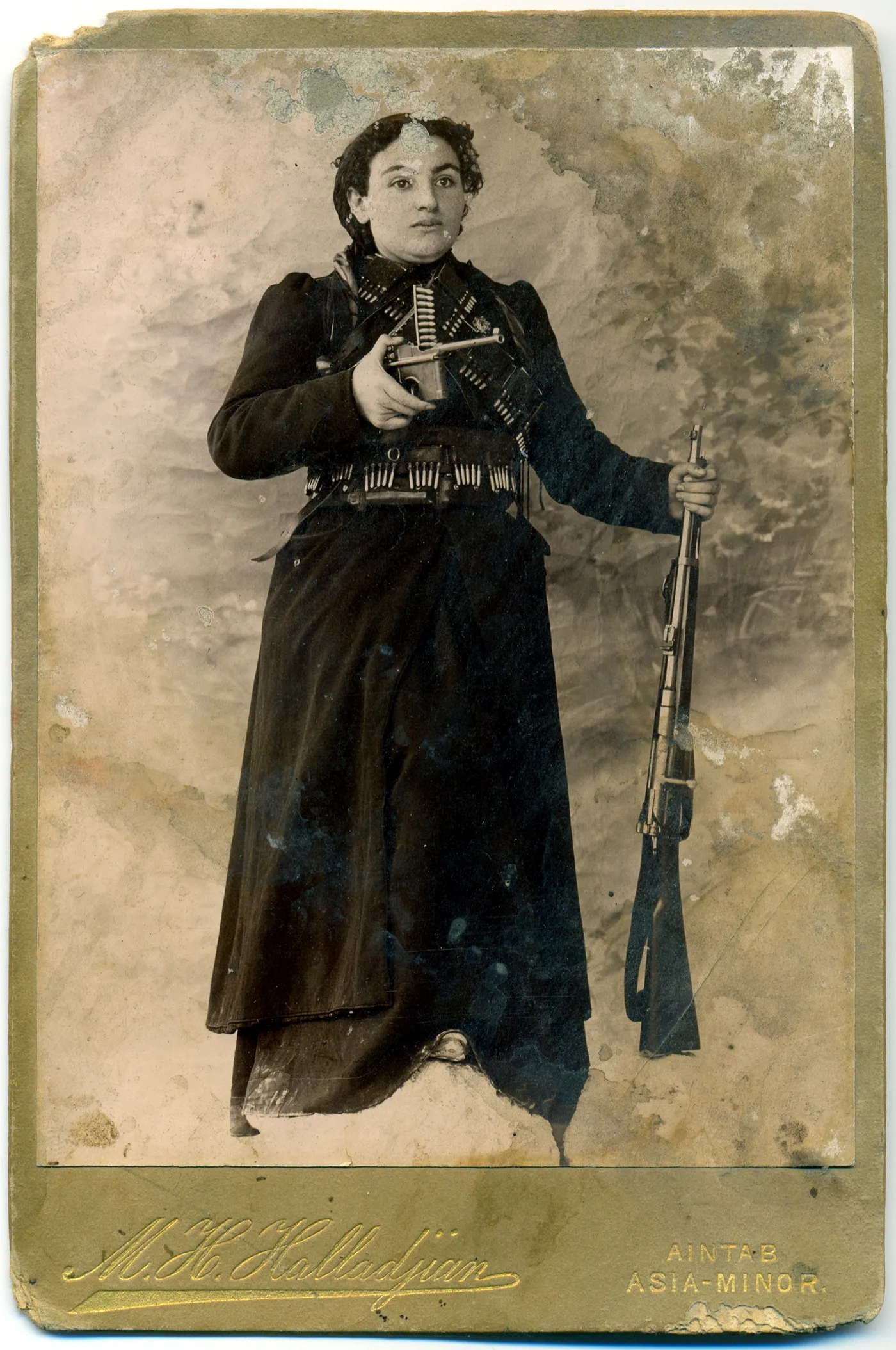
A 1910 postcard (front) portraying the widow of Kevork Chavush, Heghine.

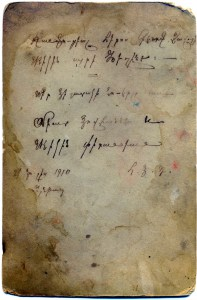
Back of postcard, reading "Deceased hero Kevork Chavush’s Wife, the widow Heghine."

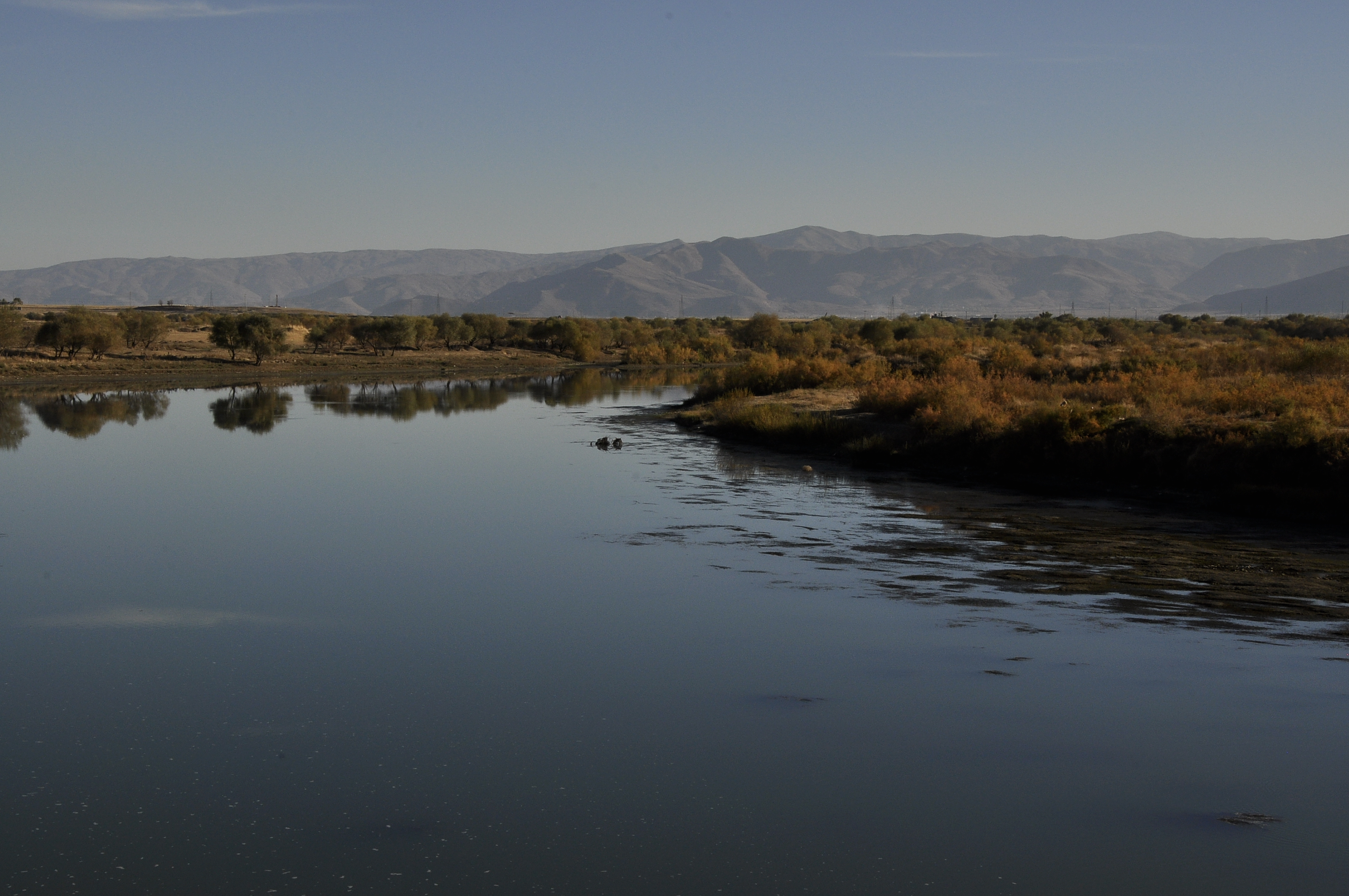
Taken on the Sulukh bridge on the River Aratsani. Kevork Chavush was critically wounded here on May 27, 1907, during a battle with the Ottoman army and died the next day.
