= Norshen =

Norshen or Norşen may refer to:

- Norshen, Shirak, Armenia
- Norshen, Nagorno-Karabakh, Martuni Province, Artsakh
- Yenikənd, Goranboy, Azerbaijan
- Norsen, School in Helsinki
