= Kevork Chavoush Museum =

Museum in Ashnak, Armenia

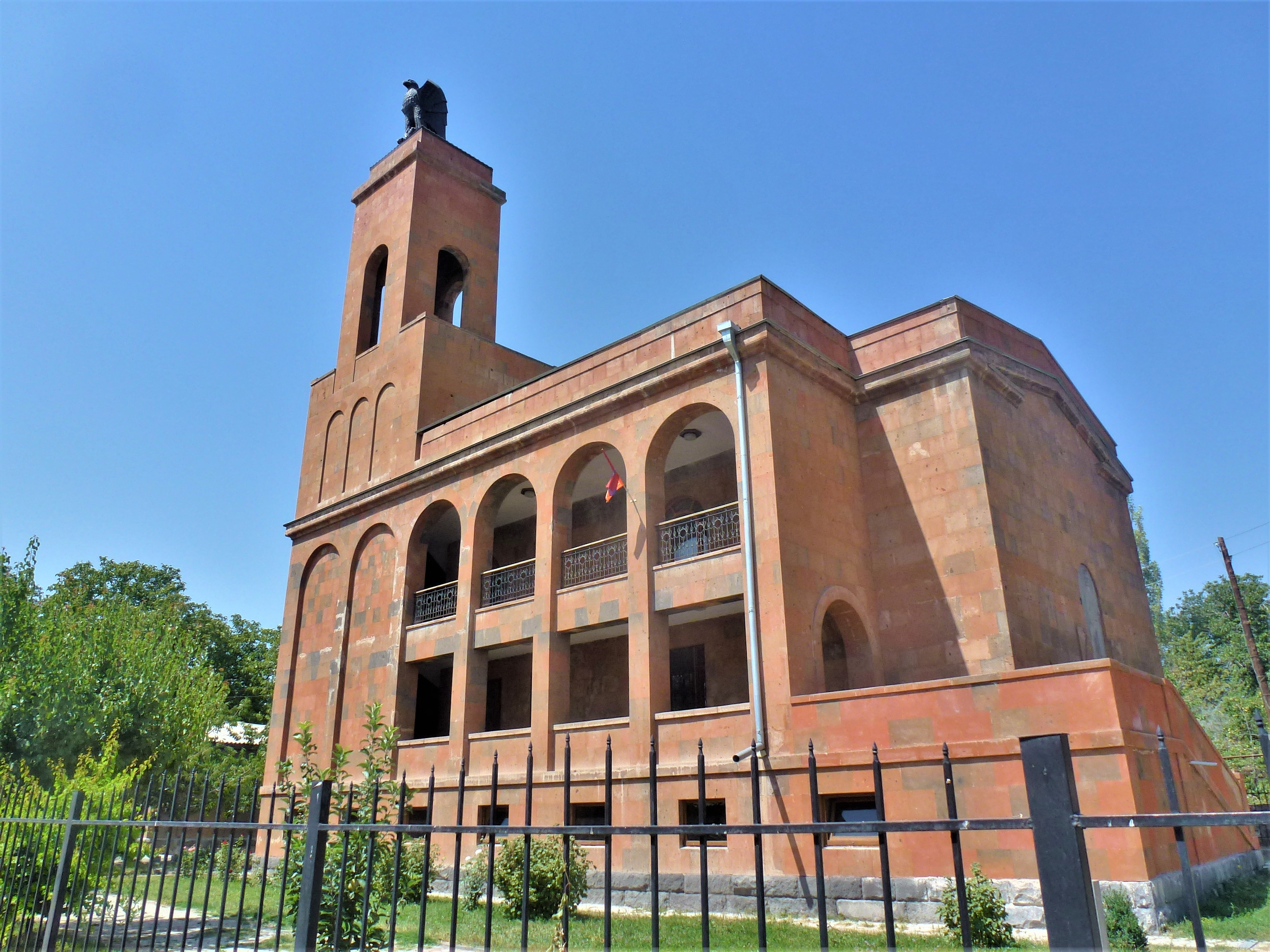
- Kevork Chavoush Museum in 2015
- Established: 1980
- Location: Ashnak, Armenia
- Coordinates: 40.33°N 43.92°E
- Type: History museum
- Founder: Gevorg Melkonyan
- Architect: Rafael Israelyan

The Kevork Chavoush Museum was opened in 1980 and is located in Ashnak, Armenia. The museum displays the history and culture of Ashnak and also presents the life and work of Kevork Chavoush, a leader of the Armenian national liberation movement, including his personal belongings.

== History ==
The museum was built in the 1980s by the initiative of Gevorg Melkonyan, a nephew of Kevork Chavush, and designed by architect Rafael Israelyan. An eagle flying westward towards Western Armenia was later added on the museum tower. The sculpture of an Armenian Eagle was erected in 2014 on the "Fidayatan" tower of the Kevork Chavush Museum and was designed by architect Levon Mkrtchyan and sculptor Gevorg Gevorgyan.
