= Surb Karapet Monastery =

Former Armenian monastery in Turkey

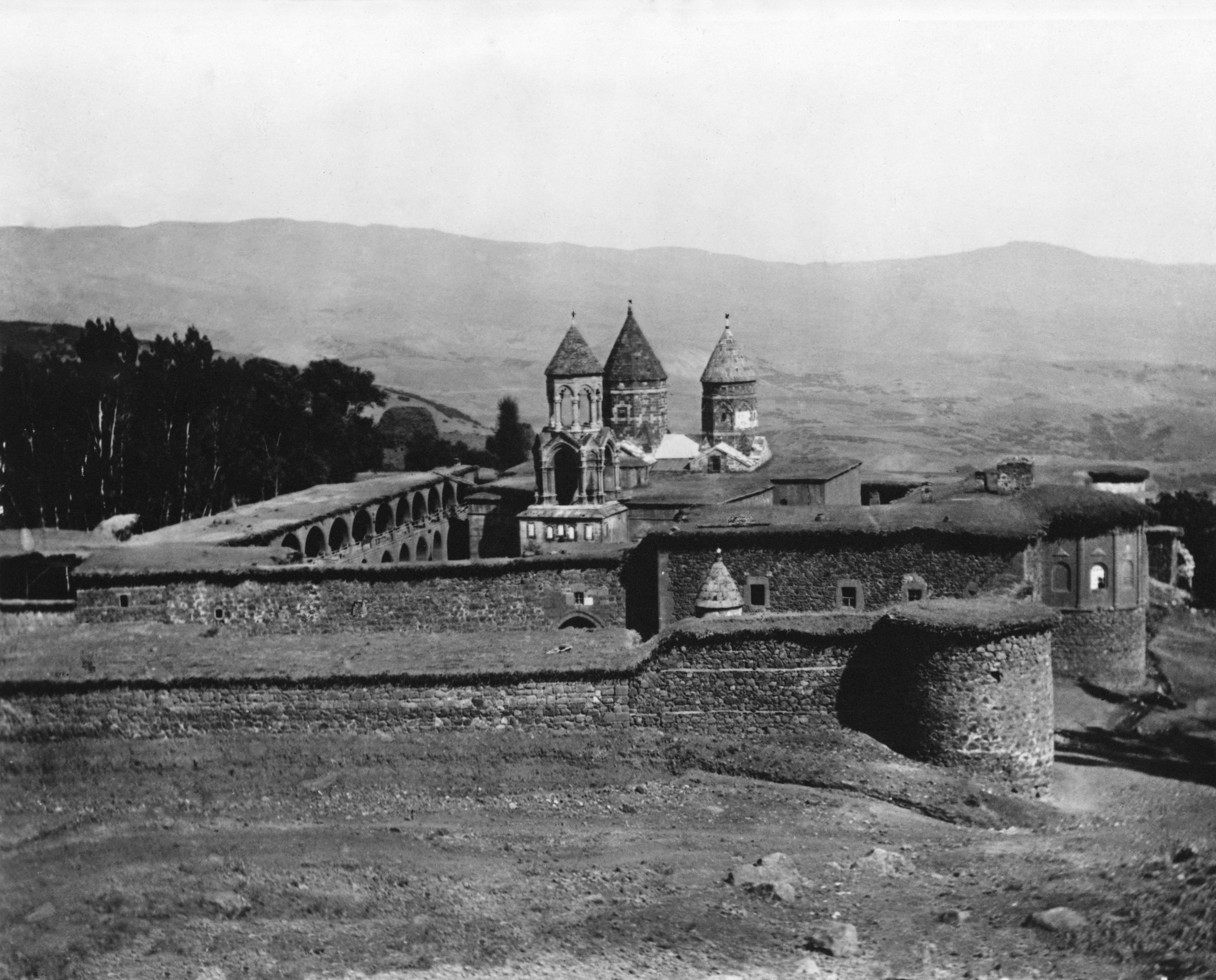
- The monastery before its destruction in 1915

- Location within Turkey

Religion
- Affiliation: Armenian Apostolic Church
- Status: Completely demolished; some traces remain

Location
- Location: Yukarıyongalı (Çengilli), Muş Province, Turkey
- Coordinates: 38.961068°N 41.191697°E

Architecture
- Type: Monastery
- Style: Armenian
- Founder: Gregory the Illuminator
- Groundbreaking: 4th century (traditional date)
- Completed: 4th–19th centuries

Surb Karapet Monastery of Mush (Armenian: Մշո Սուրբ Կարապետ վանք, Msho Surb Karapet vank, (Note: Classical Armenian orthography: Մշոյ Սուրբ Կարապետ վանք; Western Armenian pronunciation: Mšo Surp Garabed vank'․ Turkish: Surp Garabet or Surpgarabet Manastırı.) also known by other names) was an Armenian Apostolic monastery in the historic province of Taron, about 30 km (19 mi) northwest of Mush (Muş), in present-day eastern Turkey.

Surb Karapet translates to "Holy Precursor" and refers to John the Baptist, whose remains are believed to have been stored at the site by Gregory the Illuminator in the early fourth century. The monastery subsequently served as a stronghold of the Mamikonians—the princely house of Taron, who claimed to be the holy warriors of John the Baptist, their patron saint. It was expanded and renovated many times in later centuries. By the 20th century, it was a large fort-like enclosure with four chapels.

Historically, the monastery was the religious center of Taron and was a prominent pilgrimage site. It was considered the most important monastery in Turkish (Western) Armenia and the second most important of all Armenian monasteries after Etchmiadzin. From the 12th century, the monastery was the seat of the diocese of Taron, which had an Armenian population of 90,000 in the early 20th century. It attracted pilgrims and hosted large celebrations on several occasions annually. The monastery was burned and looted during the Armenian genocide of 1915 and later abandoned. Its stones have since been reappropriated by local Kurds for building purposes.

== Names ==
Throughout its history, the monastery has been known by several names. One of the common names was Glakavank (Note: It is sometimes transliterated into English as Glaka vank (classical spelling: Գլակայ վանք; reformed spelling: Գլակա վանք) or Klaga vank (from Western Armenian).) (Գլակավանք), meaning "Monastery of Glak" after its first father superior, Zenob Glak. Due to its location it was also called Innaknian vank, (Note: Իննակնեան վանք in classical spelling, and Իննակնյան վանք in reformed spelling) translating to "Monastery of the Nine Springs".

Turkish sources refer to it as Çanlı Kilise (lit. "Church with Bell Towers"), or Çengelli Kilise (meaning "Church with Bells" in Kurdish, also the name of the village in which it is located). They sometimes provide a version of its Armenian name: Surpgarabet Manastırı. Turkish sources and travel guides generally omit the fact that it was an Armenian monastery.

== History ==
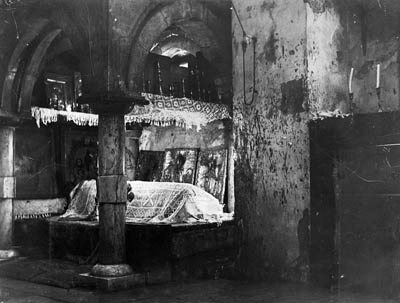
The martyrium of John the Baptist

=== Foundation to the Middle Ages ===
According to Armenian tradition, the site was founded in the early fourth century by Gregory the Illuminator, who went to Taron to spread Christianity following the conversion of King Tiridates III of Armenia. At the time, there were two brass statues of the pagan idols Gisané and Demeter on the site of the cloister. They were presumably razed to the ground by Gregory, who erected a martyrion (Note: According to Jean-Michel Thierry, the martyrium of John the Baptist was probably at first a hall-shaped building with archaic-style cupola, but was later much altered.) to house the remains of Saints Athenogenes and John the Baptist which he had brought from Caesarea. According to other sources the pagan temples were dedicated to Vahagn and Astghik, the foremost deities in pre-Christian Armenia. James R. Russell suggests that in Armenia some of the qualities of the pagan god Vahagn were passed down to John the Baptist. Folk belief held that devs (demons) were kept underneath the monastery; they would be released during the Second Coming by John the Baptist (Surb Karapet).

Zenob Glak, a Syriac archbishop, is traditionally believed to have been its first father superior. He is sometimes mentioned as the author of History of Taron (Patmutiun Tarono, Պատմութիւն Տարօնոյ), although the work is generally attributed to the otherwise unknown John Mamikonean and "scholars are convinced that the work is an original composition of a later period (post-eighth century), written as a deliberate forgery." Its main purpose seems to be asserting the monastery's preeminence. A relatively short "historical" romance, it tells the story of the five members of the Mamikonians, Taron's princely house: Mushegh, Vahan, Smbat, his son Vahan Kamsarakan, and the latter's son Tiran, who were known as the Holy Warriors of John the Baptist, their patron saint. They defended the monastery and other churches in the district.

Hrachia Acharian suggested that Mesrop Mashtots, the inventor of the Armenian alphabet, may have studied at the monastery in the late fourth century.

In the sixth century, the chronicler Atanas Taronatsi (Athanas of Taron), best remembered for collocation of the Armenian calendar, served as its father superior. The monastery's possessions were expanded in the seventh century, but the building was reduced to ruins by an earthquake in the same century. It was subsequently rebuilt and the chapel of Surb Stepanos (St. Stephen) was founded.

Christina Maranci is skeptical of the traditional narrative. She suggests that the foundation of the monastery is, instead, "most probably connected with the rise of the monastic movement" in Bagratid Armenia in the 940s. In the late ninth century, following the establishment of Bagratid Armenia, a school was founded at the monastery. In the 11th century Grigor Magistros built a palace within the monastery, but it was destroyed by fire in 1058 along with St. Gregory (Surb Grigor) Church which had a wooden roof. Following the death of the Sökmen II Shah Armen in 1185 the monastery was attacked by Muslims. Archbishop Stepanos was killed and the monks abandoned the monastery for a year.

=== Modern period ===
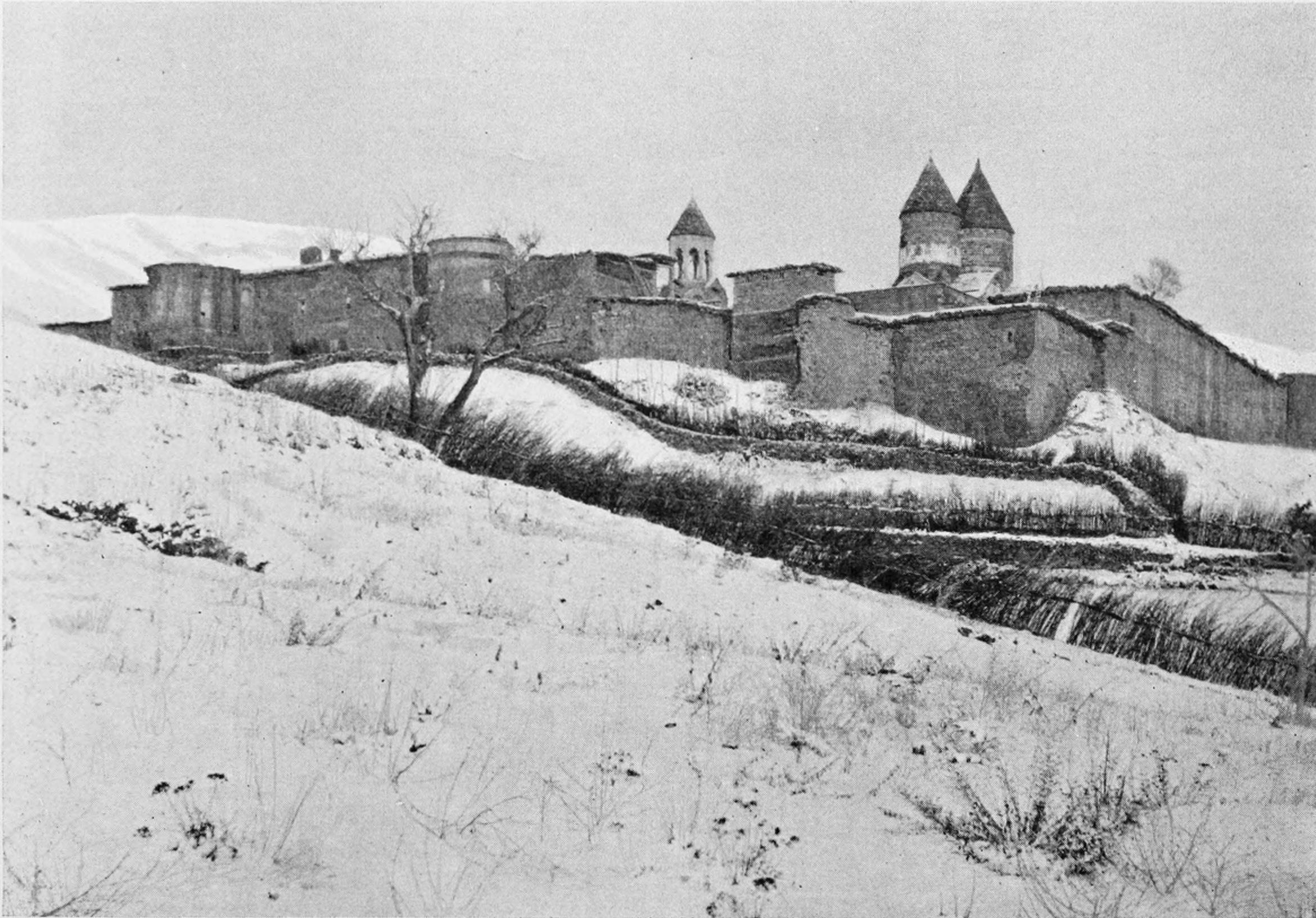
View of the monastery from the south in the 1890s

In the mid-16th century the Surb Karapet chapel was built. According to the 17th-century traveler Evliya Çelebi the leadership of the monastery made large gifts to Turkish pashas in order to secure the monastic properties. From the 16th to the 18th centuries the monastery often sheltered Armenians fleeing the Ottoman–Persian Wars. In the 1750s, the Surb Karapet church was destroyed by Persian troops. In the 18th century, several earthquakes hit the monastery. The one in 1784 being especially devastating; destroyed the main church, the refectory, part of the bell tower and the southern wall. In 1788 the monastic complex underwent complete reconstruction—its gavit (narthex) was enlarged, and renovation was carried out in its belfry, the monks' cells, scriptorium, ramparts and other sections.

==== 19th century ====
In 1827 Kurdish gangs seized and looted the monastery, destroying the furniture and manuscripts. However, the monastery prospered at the beginning in 1862 when Mkrtich Khrimian became its father superior and, simultaneously, the prelate of Taron. Khrimian sought to reform the way donations were handled by establishing a council which would finance community projects. Before his reforms, most of the money went to the monks and affluent Armenians of the region who offered fierce opposition to him, including two attempts on his life. In his first year, he founded a largely secular school at the monastery, called Zharangavorats. Among others, the fedayi Kevork Chavush and Hrayr Dzhoghk, the singer Armenak Shahmuradyan, and the writer Gegham Ter-Karapetian (Msho Gegham) studied there. From April 1, 1863 until June 1, 1865 Khrimian published the journal The Eaglet of Taron (Artzvik Tarono, «Արծւիկ Տարօնոյ») at the monastery. It was written in modern Armenian, and hence accessible to the common people. The journal sought to raise the national consciousness of the Armenians. Edited by Garegin Srvandztiants, a total of 43 issues were published. Khrimian left the monastery in 1868 when he became the Armenian Patriarch of Constantinople.

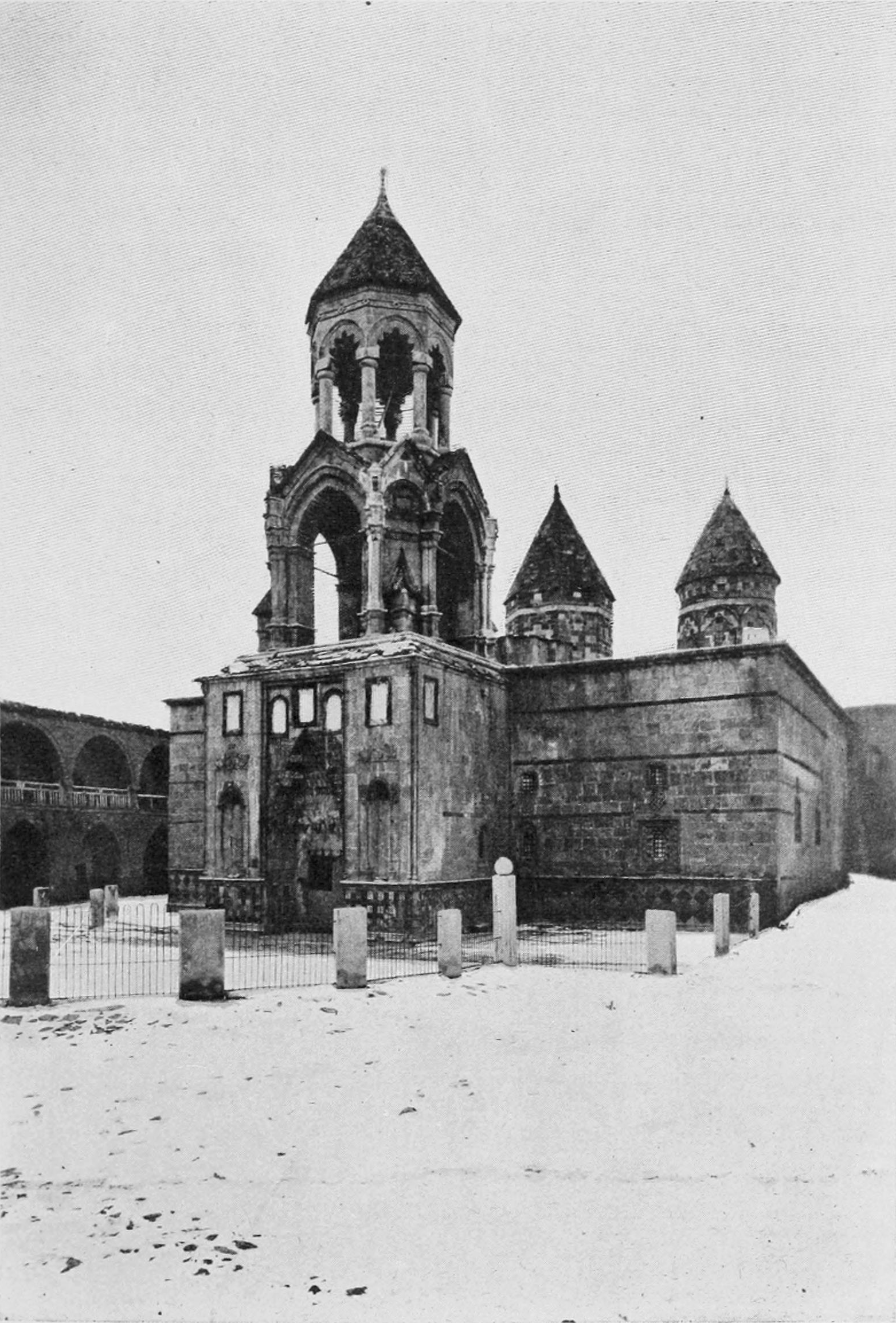
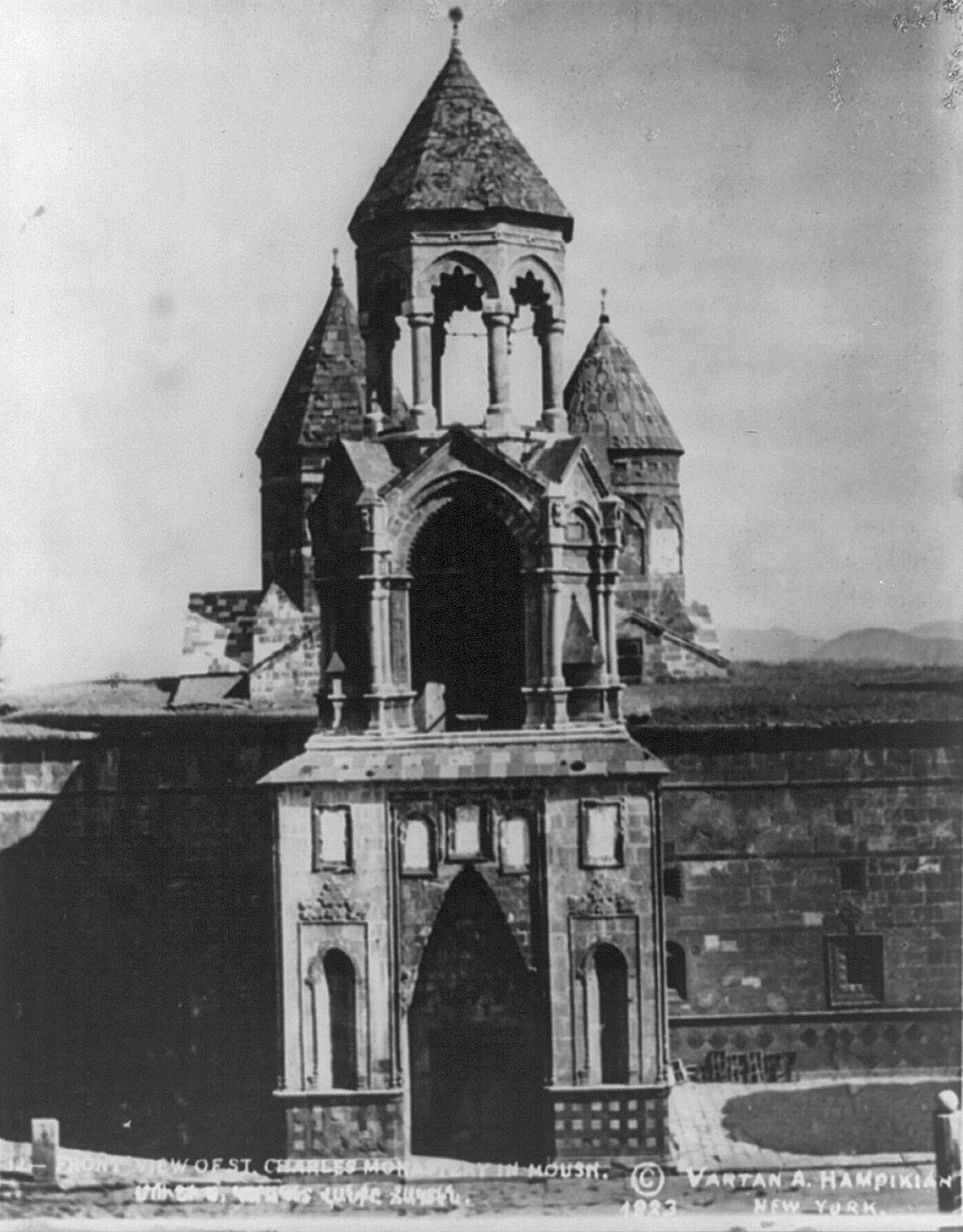
The entrance to the monastery from the bell tower

According to two French travelers in 1890, the monastery possessed large plots of land and it took several hours to get from one end to another. The estate was covered by forests, arable fields and had three farms with around a thousand goats and sheep, a hundred oxen and cattle, sixty horses, twenty donkeys and four mules, which were taken care of by 156 servants. In 1896 an orphanage was founded next to the monastery, which housed a library and a school for 45 children.

According to British traveler H. F. B. Lynch, who visited the monastery in 1893, with the presence of the Kurdish threat and the suspicions of the Turkish government "this once flourishing monastery has been stripped of much of its glamour; indeed the monks are little better than prisoners of State." The monastery was looted in 1895 during the Hamidian massacres. By the early 20th century the monastery's structure was deteriorating. The decline continued until the start of World War I.

== Destruction and current state ==
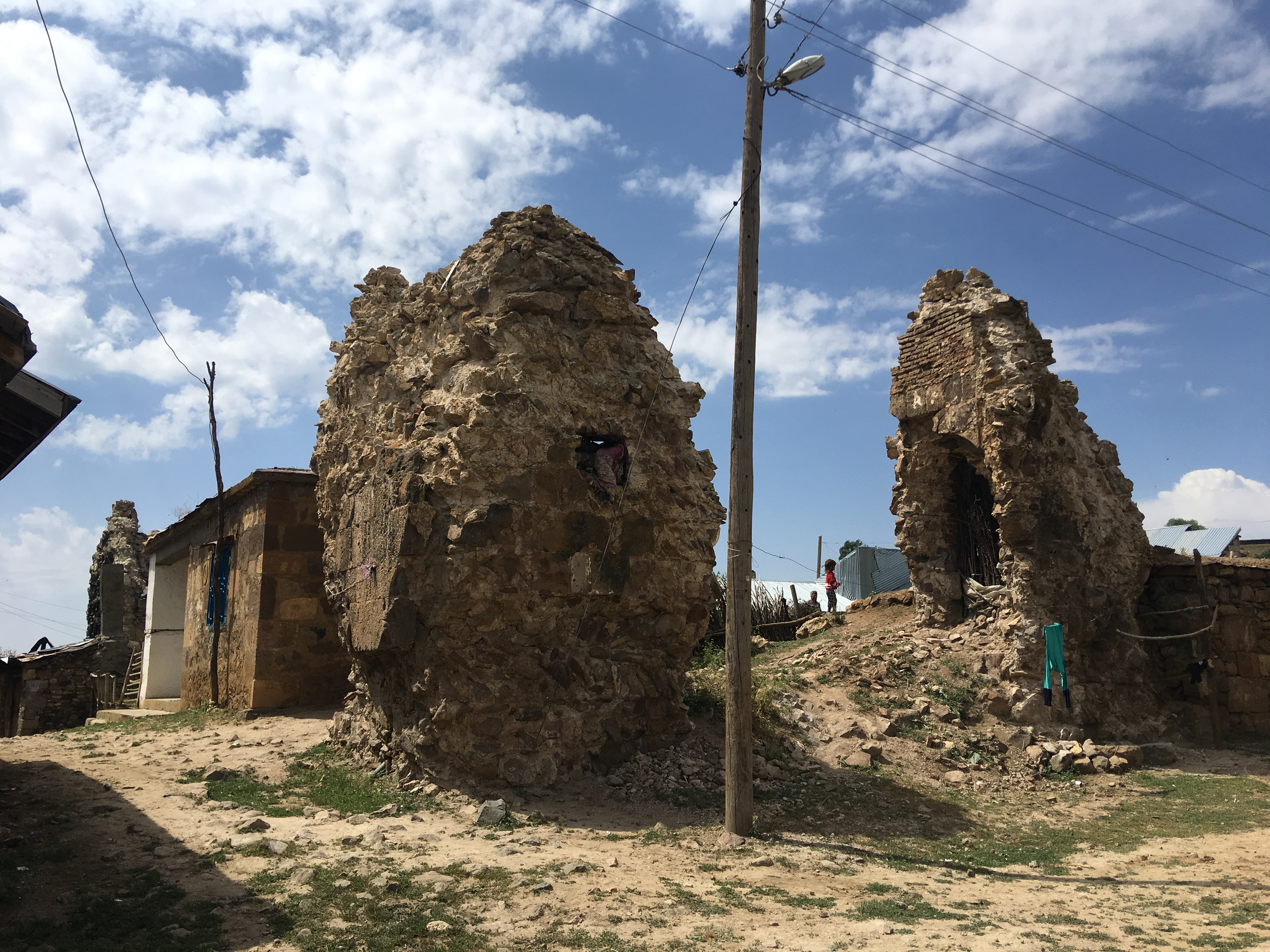
Monastery remnants

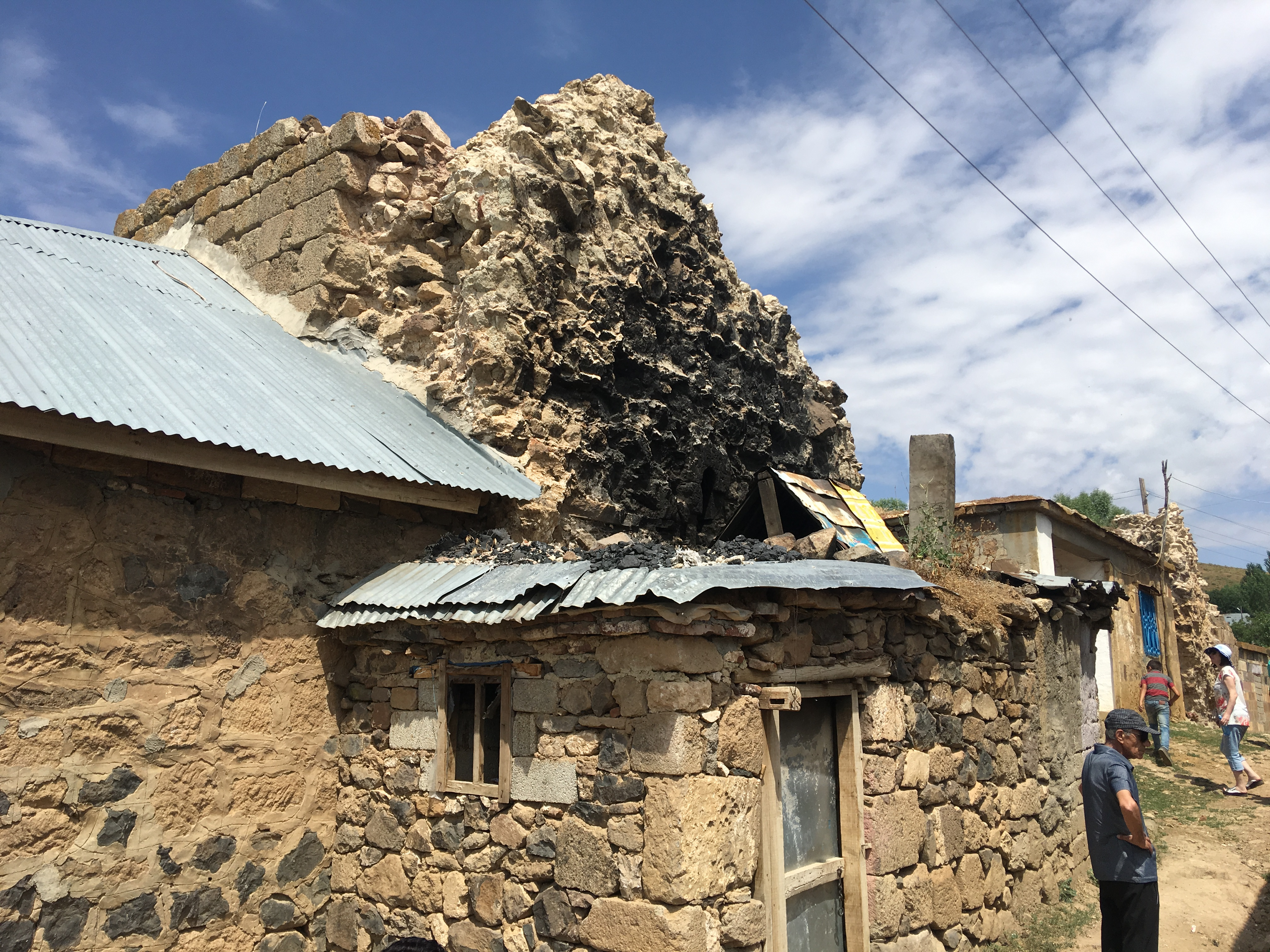

During the Armenian genocide of 1915 the monastery housed a large number of Armenians escaping the deportations and massacres. Turkish forces and Kurdish irregulars laid siege to the monastery, but the Armenians within resisted for more than two months. According to contemporary reports, around five thousand Armenians were massacred "near the wall of the monastery", while the monastery itself was "sacked and robbed". According to the American missionaries Clarence Ussher and Grace Knapp, the Turks slaughtered "three thousand men, women, and children" gathered at the courtyard of the monastery on command of a German officer.

In 1916 the Russian troops and Armenian volunteers temporarily took control of Turkish Armenia and transferred around 1,750 manuscripts to Etchmiadzin. They also saved an 18th-century reliquary of the right hand of John the Baptist made of silver repoussé. The area was recaptured by the Turks in 1918 and, subsequently, ceased to exist not only as a spiritual center, but also as an architectural monument. It remained abandoned until the 1960s when Kurdish families settled on the site. Photographs from 1951 show significant portion of the monastery still standing. Its ruins were "still visible" in the 1970s, but were subsequently "systematically used as a source of stone" to "build makeshift houses in the midst of the rubble."

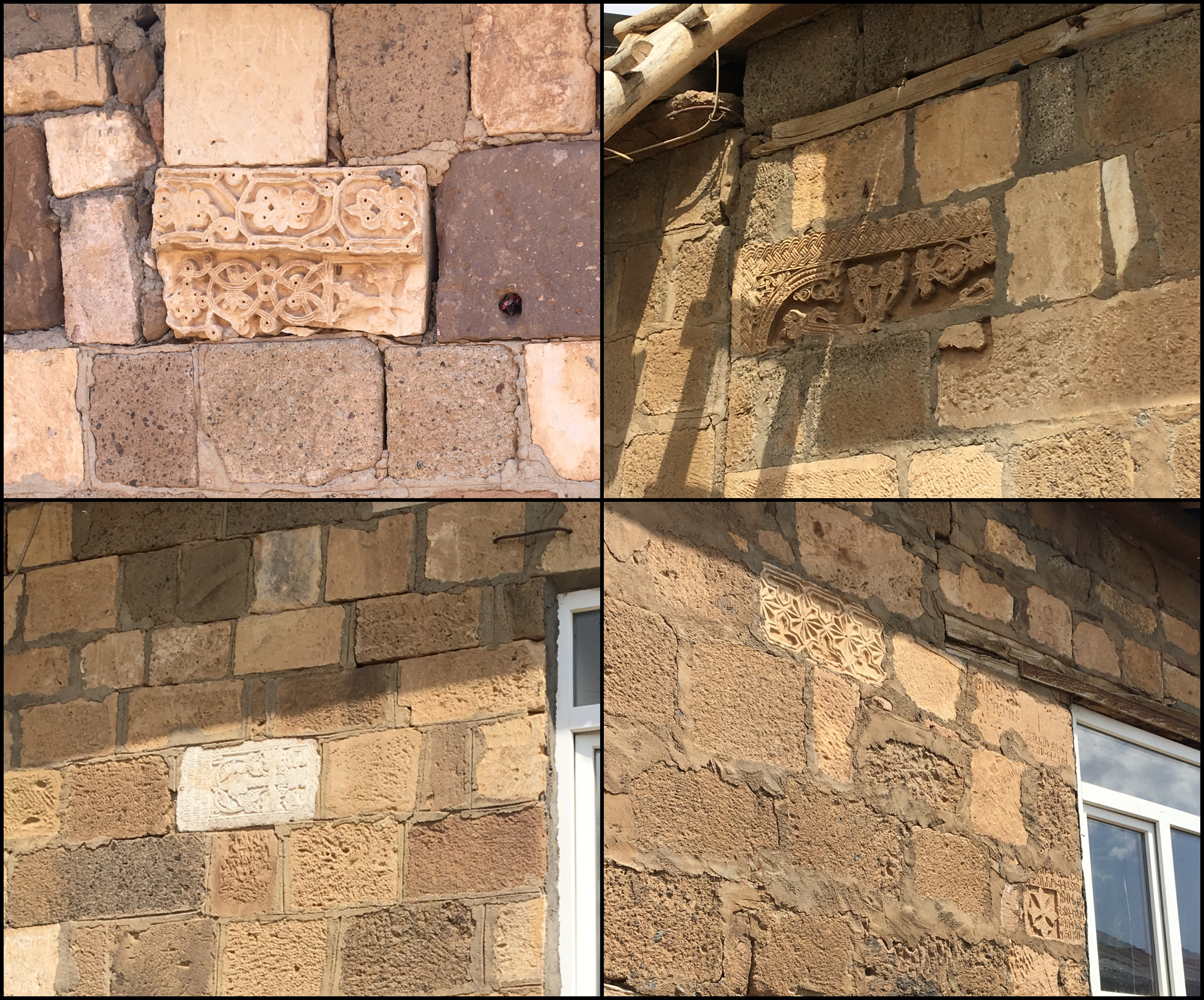
Stones from the monastery in the walls of houses in Yukarıyongalı.

Many buildings in Yukarıyongalı (or Çengilli), a small Kurdish village built on its site, include stones from the monastery and khachkars (cross stones), which are embedded in the walls. (Note: "Their homes, built from the fine dressed stones of the monastery, are often found decorated with khachkars taken from the ruins." "Today Saint Karapet consists of a few shapeless ruins, carved stones and khachkars which have been used as building material by the current Muslim residents (mostly Zaza Kurds), and are often found embedded in the walls of local homes and structures." "Moreover, lots of houses carried a mark of the past, both in terms of memory and actual stones. Khackhars and stone blocks from the monastery had been dispersed and used as building material in the new village. We could see these stones among newer ones in the foundations and walls of homes in Chengilli." "Մշո Սուրբ Կարապետն ամբողջովին ավերված էր, որի տարածքում գտնվող քրդերի տները կառուցված էին վանքի սրբատաշ քարերից և խաչքարերից") The remaining stones are "being systematically carried off by the local Kurds for their own building purposes." According to historian Robert H. Hewsen, as of 2001, only traces of two chambers of the chapel of Surb Stepanos remain, while the rest of the monastery's remains consist of "foundations and ruined walls", which are used as barns.

In May 2015 Aziz Dağcı, the President of the NGO "Union of Social Solidarity and Culture for Bitlis, Batman, Van, Mush and Sasun Armenians", made a formal appeal to the Turkish Ministries of Culture and Interior requesting the reconstruction of the monastery and the removal of all 48 houses and 6 barns on its former location. Dagcı stated that according to the 1923 Treaty of Lausanne the Turkish government obliged to preserve the religious institutions and structures of ethno-religious minorities, including those of the Armenian community. He added that he first forwarded a letter to government agencies in 2012 who promised to clean the site within six months. Dağcı stated in March 2016 that an eviction order was issued, but the governor of Muş arbitrarily does not comply with the decision.

== Surfaced artifacts ==
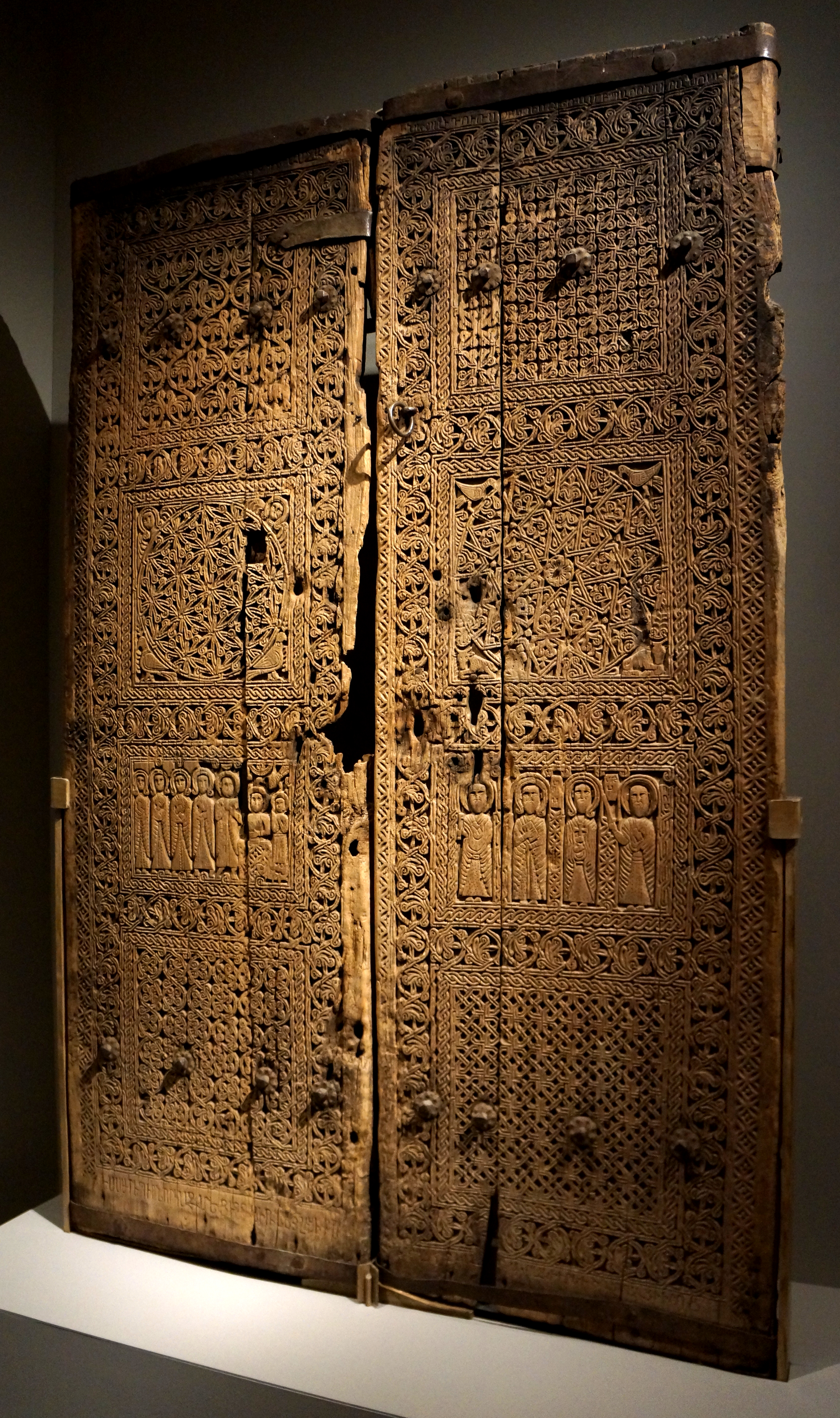
The carved wooden doors on display at the Met in 2018.

=== Doors ===
Two monumental carved wooden doors from the monastery, dated 1212, (Note: "The area of the inscription indicating the date is unfortunately damaged, leading scholars to suggest three different readings of the numerals: 661 (ad 1212), 761 (ad 1312), and 961 (ad 1512). Comparisons with other wood doors from medieval Armenia, as well as with khachkar carving, make a date in the thirteenth or fourteenth centuries more likely.") were displayed at the Metropolitan Museum of Art in 2018. Carved from walnut by the artist Sarepion, it measures 185 cm × 115 cm (73 in × 45 in). Christina Maranci described the pair of doors as "carefully designed" and "elaborately carved".

It belongs to a private collector in Canada who acquired it from Christie's in 1996. It was discovered by an Istanbul-based German artist in 1976 who acquired it for 5,000 Deutsche Marks. After his death, it was auctioned in London in 1996 and sold for $50,000 ($92,000 adjusted for inflation in 2024 dollars).

=== Silver cross ===
In August 2013 an Armenian-style silver cross attributed by the seller to the Surb Karapet Monastery appeared on the Russian auction website Bay.ru and was valued at $70,000. The Mother See of Holy Etchmiadzin said that they were trying "to verify the details regarding the news reports about the auction." Art historian Levon Chookaszian noted the seller did not provide much information and added that "All we can see is that it is delicate silver work and nothing else is known [about it]."

== Architecture ==
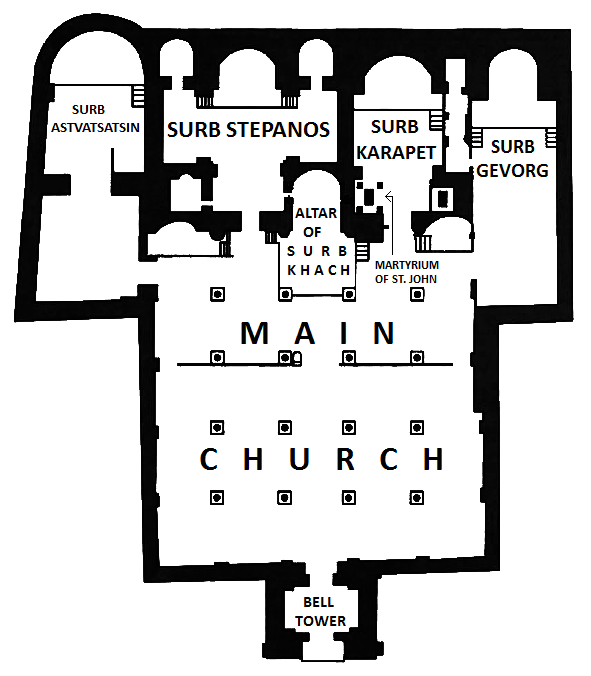
Floor plan of the monastery

The monastery was surrounded by strong walls and was similar to a fortress. Historian Dickran Kouymjian called it "a vast walled hermitage". Lynch, who visited it in 1893, described the monastery as follows: "A walled enclosure, like that of a fortress, a massive door on grating hinges—such is your first impression of this lonely fane. [...] You enter a spacious court, and face a handsome belfry and porch, the façade inlaid with slabs of white marble with bas-reliefs." A decade earlier, English traveler Henry Fanshawe Tozer wrote of the monastery: "The buildings ... are of stone, very massive and very irregular, rising one above another at various angles. There was hardly any pretence of architecture, and none of the picturesque appearance which is so characteristic of Greek monasteries."

=== Structure ===
The monastery complex was composed of the main church, dedicated to the Holy Cross (Surb Khach) and four chapels to the east: Surb Astvatsatsin (Holy Mother of God), Surb Stepanos (Saint Stephen), Surb Karapet (Holy Precursor) and Surb Gevorg (Saint George). The main church was not a typical Armenian church but was a large hall and is believed to have originally functioned as a zhamatun (chamber). It was built of mostly gray stones and was supported by 16 columns. The chapels of Surb Karapet and Surb Stepanos had domes, with "high cylindrical drums and conical roofs". The chapel of Surb Astvatsatsin was provided to Syriac (Assyrian) monks on the feast of St. John.

The three-storey bell tower was built in the 18th century. There were also monk cells, a refectory, accommodations for pilgrims, the 19th-century prelacy building and a monastic school.

== Cultural significance ==
The monastery was historically the religious center of Taron. From the 12th century until its destruction, the monastery was the seat of the diocese of Taron, which had an Armenian population of 90,000 (circa 1911). It was considered the largest and most eminent shrine in Western (Turkish) Armenia. (Note: "Ս. Կարապետի վանքը Արևմտյան Հայաստանում համարվում էր ամենամեծ ու ամենանվիրական սրբավայրը։ Նա ոչ միայն Տարոն աշխարհի ամենանշանավոր վանքն էր, այլև ամբողջ հայությանը ծանոթ մեծագույն մենաստանը ս. Էջմիածնից հետո։ Նրա համբավն ու հռչակը դուրս էր եկել ազգային սահմաններից և դարձել նաև սրբավայր տեղացի և օտար ազգերի համար: Բացի այդ, մեր մատենագիրների մոտ կան հիշատակություններ, որ օտարազգի քրիստոնյաներ շատ հաճախ են ուխտի եկել ս. Կարապետի վանքը։" "Արեւմտեան Հայաստանի մեծագոյն սրբատեղին եւ ուխտավայրն էր Ս. Կարապետը...") It was the second most important Armenian monastery after Etchmiadzin. (Note: "Հայաստանի հոգևոր կենտրոնների մեջ իր դերով ու նշանակությամբ եղել է երկրորդը (Էջմիածնից հետո):" "Until the 1915 genocide the monastery dedicated to Surb Karapet in the environment of Mush, west of Lake Van in present-day Turkey, was a pilgrimage site surpassed in importance only by Etchmiadzin, the See of the Armenian Apostolic Church, and perhaps Jerusalem.") It remained a prominent pilgrimage site until the First World War. People from every corner of Armenia made pilgrimages to the monastery. They usually held festivities at the monastery's yard. It was considered by believers to be "almighty" and was renowned for its perceived ability to heal the physically and mentally ill.

The monastery was popularly known as Msho sultan Surb Karapet (Մշո սուլթան Սուրբ Կարապետ), literally translating to "Sultan Surb Karapet of Mush". The epithet "Sultan" was bestowed as a reference to its high status as the "lord and master" of Taron.

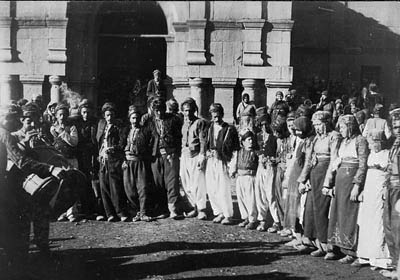
Traditional dancing

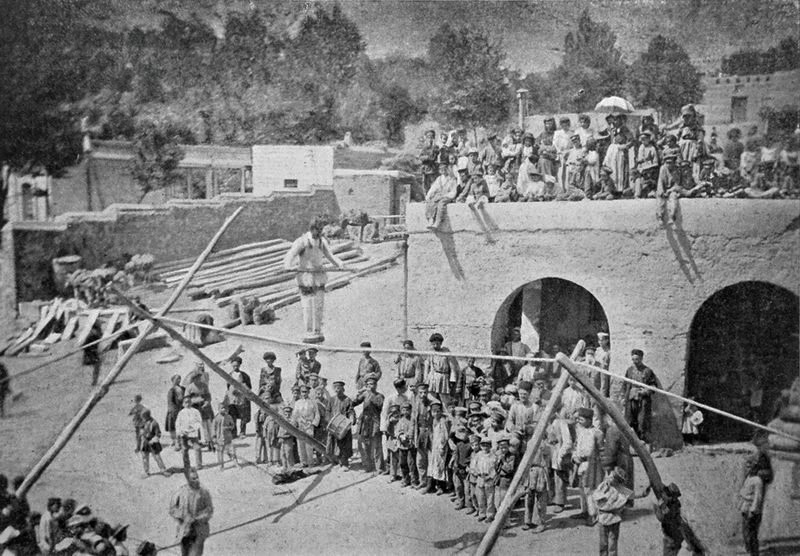
Tightrope walking

The monastery housed tombs of several Mamikonian princes as it was the dynasty's sepulchral abbey. According to Lynch, the tombs of Mushegh, Vahan the Wolf, Smbat and Vahan Kamsarakan were located near the southern wall of the monastery.

=== Annual events ===
The monastery was a center of large annual celebrations. Various secular events took place in the surroundings, such as horse races, tightrope walking and gusan competitions during the festivals of Vardavar and Assumption of Mary. Horse racing competitions were held on Vardavar and involved a large number of people. Tightrope walking was widely practiced by the Armenians of Taron and featured prominently during feasts at the monastery.

=== Ashugh tradition ===
The monastery was a traditional pilgrimage site for Armenian ashughs (folk musicians). It has been compared to Mount Parnassus in Greece, which was the home of the Muses. The prominent 18th-century ashugh Sayat-Nova is recorded to have made a trip to the monastery to seek divine grace.

== Cultural references ==
Numerous songs were dedicated to the monastery.

In the 1866 novel Salbi (Սալբի) Raffi mentions the monastery and describes its perceived almightiness.

Hovhannes Tumanyan describes the monastery in the 1890 poem "The morning of Taron" (Տարոնի առավոտը) as "magnificently ornamented".

The floor mosaic, created by the 20th-century Israeli artist Hava Yofe, inside the Chapel of Saint Helena at Jerusalem's Church of the Holy Sepulchre depicts the monastery along with other major Armenian sites.

In the 7,000-line-long poem "Ever-Tolling Bell Tower" («Անլռելի զանգակատուն») Paruyr Sevak mentions the monastery and its well-known bells. The poem, published in 1959, is dedicated to Komitas, who was among those intellectuals who were deported on April 24, 1915 during the genocide. It is recognized as "one of the most powerful literary responses to the Armenian Genocide."

In the historical novel The Call of Plowmen («Ռանչպարների կանչը», published in 1979), Khachik Dashtents describes a winter scene at the monastery.

In October 2010, during the discussion of a bill in the Armenian Parliament that would formally recognize the Nagorno-Karabakh Republic (Artsakh), opposition MP Raffi Hovannisian ended his speech saying "Let us be guided by Msho Sultan Surb Karapet".

== See also ==
- Arakelots Monastery, another prominent monastery in Taron
- Armenian cultural heritage in Turkey

== Bibliography ==
- Avetisyan, Kamsar [in Armenian] (1979). "Տարոնի պատմական հուշարձանները [Historical monuments of Taron]". Հայրենագիտական էտյուդներ [Armenian studies sketches] (in Armenian). Yerevan: Sovetakan Grogh.
- Costandian, E. A. (1999). "Տարոնի հոգևոր առաջնորդը [Spiritual leader and eparchial chief of Taron]". Lraber Hasarakakan Gitutyunneri (in Armenian) (1): 66–76.
- Ghrejyan, Lousine (2010). "Երկվորյակների առասպելի ելակետային արժեքը հայ վիպական հուշարձանների հորինվածքում [Initial Significance of the Myth of Twins in the Composition of Armenian Epic Monuments]". Patma-Banasirakan Handes (in Armenian) (2): 178–192. Archived from the original on 2022-08-07.
- Kharatyan, Lusine; Keskin, Ismail; Keshishyan, Avetis; Ozturk, S. Aykut; Khachatryan, Nane; Albayrak, Nihal; Hakobyan, Karen (2013). Moush, sweet Moush: Mapping Memories from Armenia and Turkey (PDF). The Institute for International Cooperation Of the German Adult Education Association (dvv international). ISBN 978-3-942755-12-2. Archived from the original (PDF) on 3 January 2015.
- Lynch, H. F. B. (1901). "From Mush to Erzerum". Armenia: Travels and Studies II: The Turkish Provinces. Longmans, Green, and Co. pp. 174-197.
- Mamikonean, John (1985). History of Taron. Robert Bedrosian (translator). New York: Sources of the Armenian Tradition. OCLC 13360516. Archived from the original on 2005-12-15.
- Maranci, Christina (2002). "The Art and Architecture of Baghesh/Bitlis and Taron/Mush". In Richard G. Hovannisian (ed.). Armenian Baghesh/Bitlis and Taron/Mush. Costa Mesa, California: Mazda Press.
- Sinclair, T. A. (1987). Eastern Turkey: An Architectural and Archaeological Survey, Volume 1. London: Pindar Press.
- van Lint, Theo M. (2005). "The Gift of Poetry: Khidr and John the Baptist as Patron Saints of Muslim and Armenian Āšiqs – Ašułs". Redefining Christian Identity: Cultural Interaction in the Middle East Since the Rise of Islam. Peeters Publishers. pp. 335–378. ISBN 90-429-1418-1.
