= Yenikənd, Nakhchivan =

Yenikənd, Nakhchivan may refer to:

- Kiçikoba, formerly Yenikənd, Shakhbuz
- Danyeri, formerly Yenikənd, Sharur
