= Qaraçinar =

Qaraçinar Կարաչինար • Karachinar
- Municipality
- Location within Azerbaijan
- Coordinates: 40°26′39″N 46°38′03″E
- Country: Azerbaijan
- District: Goranboy

Population
  - Total: 816
- Time zone: UTC+4 (AZT)

Qaraçinar (Garachinar; Armenian: Կարաչինար, romanized: Karachinar) is a village and municipality in the Goranboy District of Azerbaijan. It has a population of 816. The municipality consists of the villages of Qaraçinar, Qaxtut, and Yenikənd. The village had an Armenian majority prior to the First Nagorno-Karabakh War and Operation Ring.

== Notable people ==
- Georgi Vanyan
- Archaeological site of Qaraçinar
