= Qaxtut =

Coordinates: 40°27′N 46°38′E

Qaxtut is a village in the municipality of Qaraçinar in the Goranboy Rayon of Azerbaijan.
