= Battle of Holy Apostles Monastery =

Battle between Armenians and Ottomans

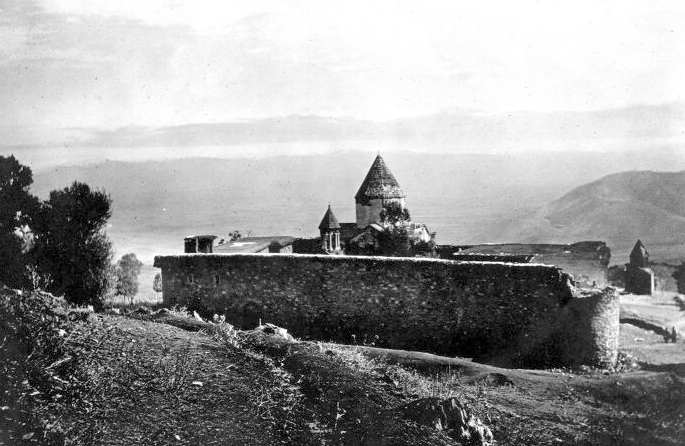
- Early 20th century photograph of Holy Apostles Monastery, where the battle took place.
Date	November 3–27, 1901
Location	Holy Apostles Monastery; Mush, Ottoman Empire
Result	Armenian victory

Belligerents
Armenian Revolutionary Federation	Ottoman Empire

Commanders and leaders
Andranik Ozanian; Kevork Chavush	(Ottoman Empire) Ferikh Pasha (Ottoman Empire) Ali Pasha

Strength
22 (Note: (Andranik, Kevork, Haroutiun from Ouroukh, Vagharshag, Hajji Hagop, Ghazar, Seydo Boghos, Andrig, Missak, Vartan, Assadour, Simon, Terpetos Sarkis, Cheto, Yegho, Parsegh, Hovsep son of Oso, Chatalbash Aram, Megro from Khaskiugh, Moso, Iso, Mourad from Havadorig)) (per Andranik); 30–38	1,200–6,000

Casualties and losses
3 (Ghazar, Haroutiun and Parsegh)	553 (according to eyewitnesses)

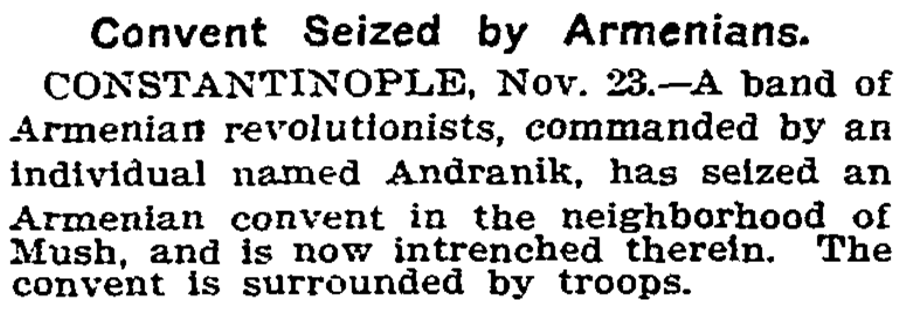
The New York Times report on the battle

The Battle of Holy Apostles Monastery (Note: Turkish: Kutsal Havariler Manastırı Muharebesi Armenian: Սուրբ Առաքելոց վանքի կռիվ) was an armed conflict between Ottoman Empire forces and Armenian militia at the Holy Apostles (Arakhelots) Monastery near Mush, Ottoman Empire in November 1901.

== Background ==
By the second half of the 19th century, living conditions for the Armenian population in the Mush valley had become intolerable. Added to central government official and unofficial taxes and dues, and Kurdish chieftains extorting their traditional tributes, where predatory Kurdish tribesmen given an official status after being incorporated into the semi-regular Kurdish cavalry units known as the Hamidiye. As a result, thousands of Armenian farmers lost their lands and eked out a living as transient hired labourers or migrated to Constantinople and other cities to live in impoverished squalid conditions. The repeated failures of promised reforms by Constantinople led to some Armenians initiating local measures for self-defense. The Social Democrat Hunchakian Party and Armenian Revolutionary Federation were two Armenian political groups active in the region. After the massacres of Armenians in Sasun in 1894, and the more widespread massacres in the plain of Mush in 1895 and 1896 during the events known as the Hamidian massacres, the political activity of the 1880s developed into armed self-defense units, known as fedayee, who used the mountains as safe havens and as areas for political agitation.

In 1899 several Armenian fedayee commanders were killed, and Andranik Ozanian was given the leadership of all such groups within the Sasun district of Bitlis Vilayet. Under Andranik's command were thirty-eight villages.

== The Battle ==
In November 1901 Andranik came down from the mountains with some 30 experienced fedayeen (including Kevork Chavush and Hakob Kotoyan) and some 8 to 10 peasants from Tsronk village. Pursued by Turkish armed forces, Andranik's men were eventually cornered and on November 20 they barricaded themselves in the Holy Apostles Monastery located to the east of Mush.

A regiment of five Turkish battalions, some 1,200 men, commanded by the pashas Ferikh and Ali, began besieging the fortified monastery. During this period the Turkish army had heavy losses because of cold weather and epidemics. After nineteen days of siege, and surrender negotiations in which Armenian clergy as well as the headman of Mush and foreign consuls took part, Andranik and his men succeeded in secretly leaving Arakelots monastery and moved in small groups back into the nearby mountains. According to Leon Trotsky, Andranik organized the escape by dressing in the uniform of a Turkish officer: "he went the rounds of the entire guard, talking to them in excellent Turkish" and "at the same time showing the way out to his own men".

== Aftermath ==
After breaking out of Arakelots Monastery, Andranik gained a legendary reputation amongst the province's Armenians. "Andranik is not a human being, he is a ghost", Turks used to say after he disappeared. The Kurds believed that when at night Andranik took off his coat, many bullets fell from it. Andranik commanded during the Second Sasun Resistance in 1904, then retreated with his men into Iran, resigned from the Dashnaktsutyun and thereafter traveled to Europe, where he participated in the First Balkan War. In 1924 in Boston, Andranik published his memoirs, The Battle of Holy Apostles' Monastery. Of the events he wrote:

It was necessary to show to the Turkish and Kurdish peoples, that an Armenian can undertake a gun, that an Armenian heart can fight and protect his rights.

== Bibliography ==
- The Battle of Holy Apostles' Monastery by Gen. Antranig, originally recorded by L. G. Loulegian and translated from Armenian by Ara Stepan Melkonian - London; Taderon Press [Gomidas Institute] 2009, ISBN 9781903656808, 70 pages
- The Battle of Holy Apostles' Monastery by Gen. Andranik, wr. Lewon K. Liwlēchean - London, 2008, ISBN 9781903656808, 59 pages
- General Andranik and the Armenian Revolutionary Movement, by Antranig Chalabian - Southfield, 1988, ISBN 9780962274114, 588 pages
