= Düzdaq =

Düzdaq is a small village in the municipality of Nemətabad in the Yevlakh Rayon of Azerbaijan.
