= Battle of Sulukh =

- Part of Armenian National Liberation Movement
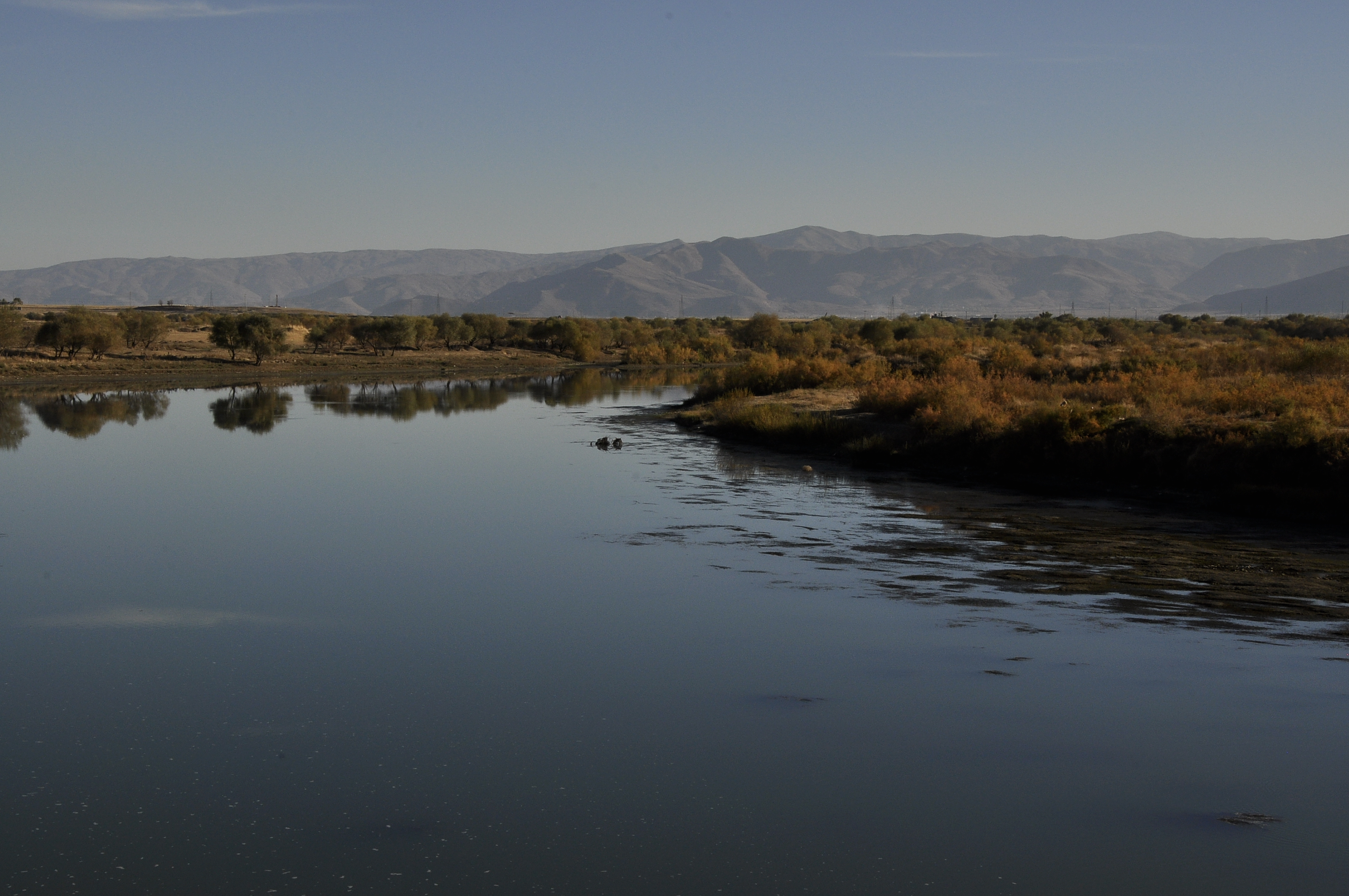
- The battle site
Date	27 May 1907
Location	Sulukh, near Muş, Ottoman Empire
Result	Ottoman victory

Belligerents
Armenian fedayi	Ottoman Empire

Commanders and leaders
Gevorg Chavush †	Cherkez Keosse Binbashi †

Strength
84 Fedayi; Village militia	2,000 soldiers

Casualties and losses
21 dead, 7 wounded	120 dead, 100 wounded
- 23 Armenian civilians massacred

The Battle of Sulukh was fought between Armenian fedayis and Turkish forces on 27 May 1907. It is most notable for being the conflict that led to the death of Gevorg Chavush.

== Battle ==
At that time, Sulukh was a small village of around a hundred houses on the road from Erzurum to Muş. The fedayi entourage was camping there overnight, when the Turks attacked them. Fedayi leaders Gevorg Chavush, Sbaghanats Kaleh, Seito Boghos, Ghazar of Shenik, and Ruben Ter Minasian (who later recounted the battle in his memoirs) were present. The Armenians were besieged by the Turks. At the start of the battle, the resistance of the Armenians was successful. However, after a massive Turkish attack, the Turks captured the village. During the defense, Sbaghanats Kaleh was killed and Gevorg Chavush was wounded and lost consciousness (which later caused his death). Nevertheless, the death of Colonel Keosse Binbashi panicked the Turks, as a result of which the Armenians launched a surprise attack, and the fedayeen were able to carry Gevorg away from the village. Gevorg's comrades carried him to the bank of the Aratsani River (Eastern Euphrates) and left him under a bridge with some villagers from Sulukh; Gevorg died of his wounds the next morning on 28 May.

== Casualties ==
The Armenians lost 3 fedayeen, 18 inexperienced village fighters and 23 non-combatants. 7 more fedayeen were wounded. Gevorg Chavush was severely wounded in the battle, and died soon after.

The Turks lost their colonel (Cherkez Keosse Binbashi), 2 captains, 5 officers, 110 soldiers, a police chief and a doctor. The Turks retrieved Gevorg's body and gave a state funeral to both him and their own colonel.
