= Qırmızı Şəfəq =

- Municipality
- Location within Azerbaijan
- Coordinates: 39°23′N 49°19′E
- Country: Azerbaijan
- Rayon: Neftchala
- Time zone: UTC+4 (AZT)
  - Summer (DST): UTC+5 (AZT)

Qırmızı Şəfəq is a village in the municipality of Yenikənd in the Neftchala Rayon of Azerbaijan.
