= Hacılar, Agdash =

Hacılar
- Location within Azerbaijan
- Coordinates: 40°43′32″N 47°20′28″E
- Country: Azerbaijan
- Rayon: Agdash
- Municipality: Yuxarı Nemətabad
- Time zone: UTC+4 (AZT)
  - Summer (DST): UTC+5 (AZT)

Hacılar (also, Gadzhylar and Gadzhyly) is a village in the Agdash Rayon of Azerbaijan. The village forms part of the municipality of Yuxarı Nemətabad.
