= John Mamikonean =

John or Hovhan Mamikonyan (in Armenian Հովհան Մամիկոնյան) was a 7th-century Armenian noble from the Mamikonian dynasty, author of the History of Taron, which is a continuation of the account of Zenob Glak. John is not known from any source other than his History, and in the colophon self-identifies as the 35th bishop of Glak after Zenob.
