= Georgi Vanyan =

Armenian peace activist (1963–2021)

- Born: 1963
- Died: 15 October 2021 (aged 58); Tbilisi, Georgia
- Known for: Peace activism

Georgi Vanyan (1963 – 15 October 2021) was an Armenian peace activist and chairman of the Caucasus Center of Peace-Making Initiatives.

== Political activism ==
Vanyan has often been branded a traitor by nationalists, and his initiatives led to protests.

In 2007, he organized Days of Azerbaijan at a public school in Yerevan. The event was briefly disrupted by a small group of nationalist bloggers opposed to any concessions to Azerbaijan.

In 2011, Vanyan opened a peace center in Tekalo, a small village in Georgia a few kilometers from the border with Armenia and Azerbaijan. The project was supported by a small group of other civil society activists, cultural figures and journalists in Azerbaijan and Georgia.

In April 2012 Vanyan tried to organize a festival of Azerbaijani films in Armenia's second-largest city, Gyumri, which had to be canceled after dozens of protesters blocked the festival venue. The event was organized by Vanyan's Caucasus Center for Peace-Making Initiatives and had the support of the U.S. and British embassies in Yerevan.

On 8 November 2020, during the 2020 Nagorno-Karabakh war he was fined by Armenian police for a Facebook post calling for dialogue with Azerbaijan. In the offending post, Vanyan wrote that Armenia "had long crossed the threshold of crimes against its own citizens". He called to "stop this criminal farce that speaks of victory: one does not have victory over a neighbour, one does not trample a neighbour, one does not destroy a neighbour. One talks with a neighbour and keeps talking until they find the ability to speak the same language, until reaching mutual understanding."

In February 2021, together with Emin Milli from Azerbaijan, Vanyan called for civil society-led reconciliation between Armenia and Azerbaijan.

== Death ==
Vanyan died on 15 October 2021 from COVID-19 in Tbilisi, Georgia.
