= Yenikənd, Oghuz =

Village in Oghuz Rayon, Azerbaijan

Yenikənd is a municipality and village in the Oghuz Rayon of Azerbaijan. It has a population of 379.
