= Arakelots Monastery =

Armenian monastery in Turkey

- Մշո Սուրբ Առաքելոց վանք
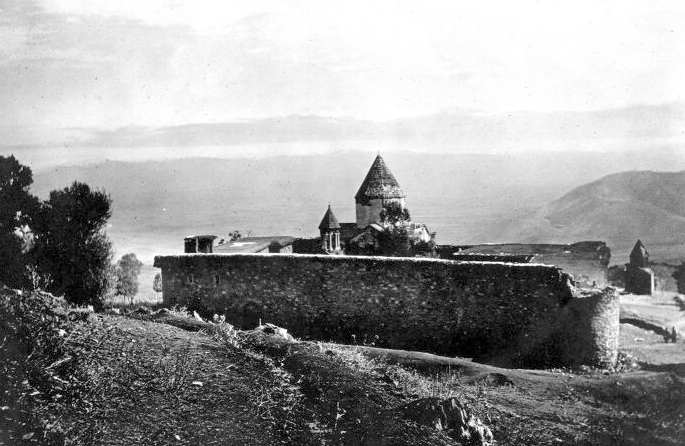
- The monastery in the early 20th century. Photo by Vartan A. Hampikian, published in New York in 1923

- Location within Turkey

Religion
- Affiliation: Armenian Apostolic Church
- Status: Destroyed

Location
- Location: Arak (Kepenek) Village, Muş Province
- Country: Turkey
- Coordinates: 38.695786°N 41.519517°E

Architecture
- Type: Monastery
- Style: Armenian
- Founder: Gregory the Illuminator
- Groundbreaking: early 4th century (traditional date); 11th century (earliest verifiable date)
- Completed: 11th–12th centuries

Arakelots Monastery (Armenian: Մշո Սուրբ Առաքելոց վանք, Mšo Surb Arakelots vank' , "Holy Apostles Monastery of Mush") was an Armenian monastery in the historic province of Taron, 11 km south-east of Mush (Muş), in present-day eastern Turkey. According to tradition, Gregory the Illuminator founded the monastery to house relics of several apostles. The monastery was, however, most likely built in the 11th century. During the 12th-13th centuries it was a major center of learning. In the following centuries it was expanded, destroyed and renovated. It remained one of the prominent monasteries of Turkish (Western) Armenia until the Armenian genocide of 1915, when it was attacked and subsequently abandoned. It remained standing until the 1960s when it was reportedly blown up. Today, ruins of the monastery are still visible.

== Names ==
The monastery was most commonly known as Arakelots, however, it was also referred to as Ghazaru vank (Ղազարու վանք; "Monastery of Lazarus"), after its first abbot Yeghiazar (Eleazar). It was also sometimes known as Gladzori vank (Գլաձորի վանք), originating from the nearby gorge called Gayli dzor (Գայլի ձոր, "Wolf's gorge").

Official Turkish sources refer to it as Arak Manastırı, a Turkified version of its Armenian name. Turkish sources and travel guides generally omit the fact that it was an Armenian monastery.

== History ==
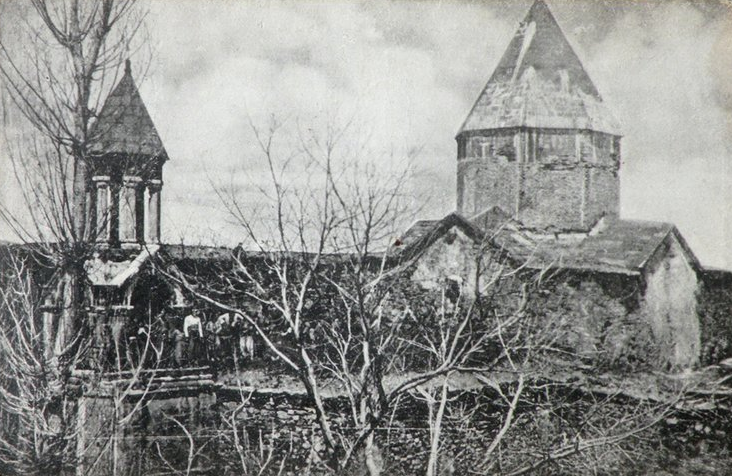
A close up view of the monastery (1900)

According to "a late medieval tradition", the monastery was founded in the early 4th century (in 312 AD according to one author) by Gregory the Illuminator to house various relics of apostles he transferred from Rome. "Those relics (which included the left arms of Saint Peter and Saint Paul and right arm of the apostle Andrew) account for the monastery's name." According to Christina Maranci, evidence shows that the monastery was constructed in the latter half of the 11th century during the rule of the Tornikians—a branch of Mamikonians—who ruled Taron between 1054 and 1207. She writes that it is this era "which most scholars date the earliest portion of the structure." According to an inscription on a khachkar, it was renovated in 1125. In the east side of the monastery there were nine 11th century khachkars with inscriptions.

In the following centuries it became a prominent educational center. The monastery school was active in 11th-12th centuries under chronicler and teacher Poghos Taronetsi, although it is known that translations were being made at the school since the 5th century. It flourished in 1271–81 under Nerses Mshetsi, who later moved to Syunik and established the University of Gladzor in 1280.

Between the 13th and 16th centuries, various Turco-Mongol dynasties ruled Taron. In the 14th century it was destroyed by Tamerlane's invasions. The Ottoman Empire annexed the region in the mid-16th century.

A wall was built around the monastery in 1791.

In November 1901 a skirmish between Armenian fedayi (irregulars) and the Ottoman forces took place in and around the monastery.

According to Jean-Michel Thierry, "the main church and chapels were still in a reasonably good state in 1960. Soon thereafter, however, they were reportedly dynamited by an official from Mush."

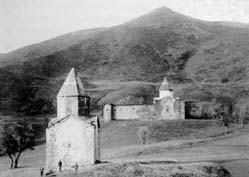
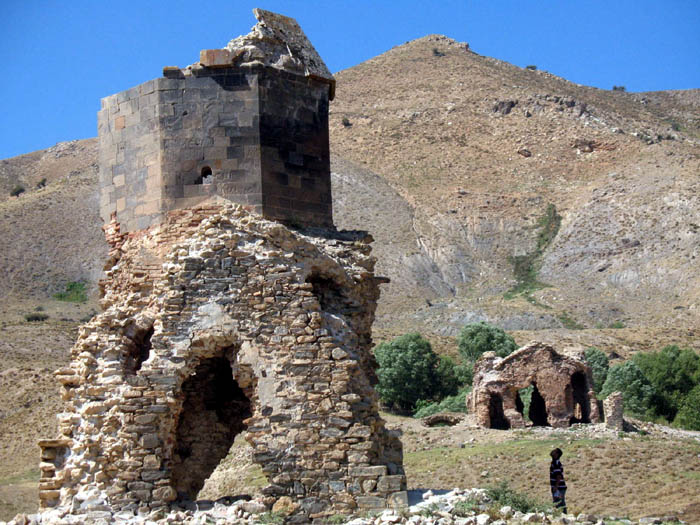
St. Thaddeus church in the foreground and the Arakelots monastery in the background before destruction (1900s) and their ruins in 2010.

== Structure ==
The ensemble consists of a main church with two chapels, a narthex (zhamatun), and a bell tower.

Within monastery walls

The St. Arakelots Church—the monastery's main church—was built in the 11th century. "It consists of an inscribed quatrefoil masked on the exterior by a massive rectangle. Barrel vaults top each of the four arms of the interior, as well as the corner chapels, which are two-storied at both east and west. A dome on squinches, now collapsed, once rested on an octagonal drum above the structure's central bay. Interior decoration included wall painting, and in the apse one can still discern human figures, most likely representing apostles." It had only one door, on the western side. The church was constructed of brick and mortar. The church was renovated in 1614. Its floor plan was cross-shaped, it had a rectangular shape in the outside. The dome, restored in 1663, was an octagon in the outside. A rectangular gavit (narthex) was built in 1555 by abbot Karapet Baghishetsi.

To the west there was a three-storey bell tower with eight columned rotunda built by Ter Ohannes vardapet in 1791. (It has been suggested that a bell tower probably existed earlier than that and was destroyed.) Its lowest floor survives.

On the foundations of a 14th-century church, the St. Stepanos (Stephen) chapel was built south of the main church in 1663. "Composed of a single aisle terminating in an apse", it is now half-buried in rubble.

On the northern side, only ruins of the St. Gevorg (George) chapel could have been found.

St. Thaddeus Church

The St. Tadevos (Thaddeus), though not within the monastery walls, was located some 300 meters northeast. Dated to the 13-14th centuries by Jean-Michel Thierry, it was well preserved. On the exterior, it was well-polished tufa; on the inside bricks.

== Cultural heritage ==
=== The wooden door ===
The wooden door of the Arakelots Church is considered a masterpiece and one of the finest pieces of medieval Armenian art. It was created in 1134 by Grigor and Ghukas. It depicts non-religious, historic scenes. The front side probably shows a prince as he has a scepter on his right hand. During World War I, German archaeologists reportedly transferred it to Bitlis in hope to later move it to Berlin. However, in 1916 when Russian troops took control of the region, historian and archaeologist Smbat Ter-Avetisian found the door in Bitlis, in a booty abandoned by the retreating Turks, and with a group of migrants, brought the door to the Museum of the Armenian Ethnographic Association in Tbilisi. In the winter of 1921–22 Ashkharbek Kalantar moved it to Yerevan's newly founded History Museum of Armenia.

=== Manuscripts ===
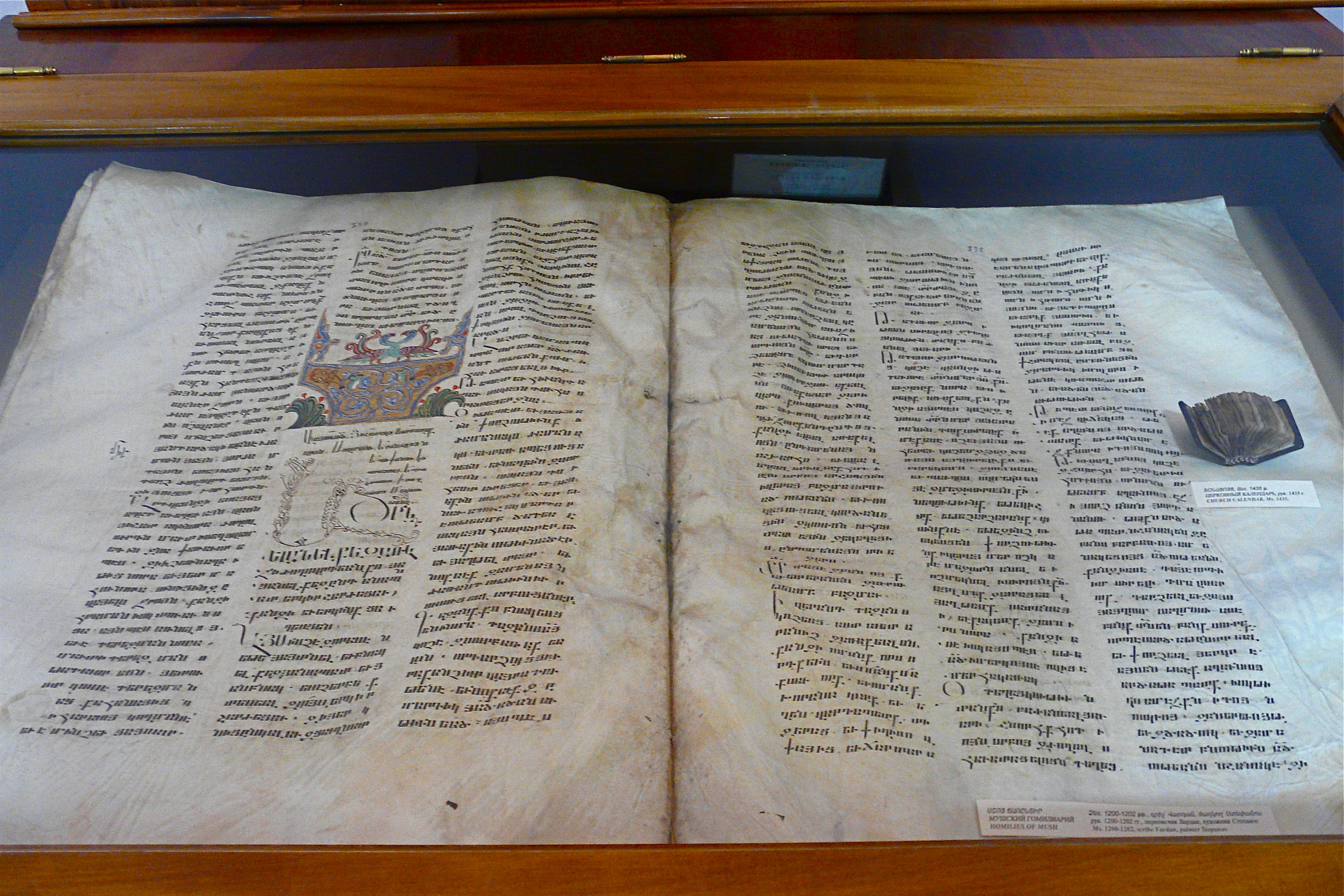
The Mush Homiliarium

Many manuscripts were preserved in the monastery. Notably, a manuscript named Homiliarium (Ms. 7729, commonly known as the "Mush Homiliarium", «Մշո ճառընտիր» Mšo Č̣aṙəntir), the largest known Armenian manuscript. It was not created in the Arakelots Monastery, but rather in the Avag Monastery near Yerznka (Erzincan) between 1200 and 1202; written by the scribe Vardan Karnetsi, and illuminated by Stepanos. Written on vellum, it now has 601 pages and weighs 28 kilograms. It originally had 660 pages, 17 of which are now in Venice and one in Vienna. Two pages were transferred to Yerevan from the Moscow Lenin Library in 1977 which were separated in 1918. In 1202 it was robbed by a non-Armenian judge who sold it to the Arakelots Monastery in 1204 for four thousand silver coins collected by locals. It was kept there from its acquisition in 1205 until 1915. During the genocide it was taken to Tbilisi in two separate parts and later transferred to Yerevan. It is now preserved at the Matenadaran.

== Burials ==
Historian Movses Khorenatsi and philosopher David the Invincible are believed to have been buried in the monastery courtyard.

== See also ==
- Saint Karapet Monastery, another prominent monastery in Taron
- The Making of Modern Turkey (2011) by Uğur Ümit Üngör features the ruined monastery on its cover

== Bibliography ==
- Avetisyan, Kamsar [in Armenian] (1979). "Տարոնի պատմական հուշարձանները [Historical monuments of Taron]". Հայրենագիտական էտյուդներ [Armenian studies sketches] (in Armenian). Yerevan: Sovetakan Grogh.
- Manucharyan, Henzel (1976). Մշո Առաքելոց վանքի գրչության դպրոցը [Scriptorium of Arakelots monastery of Mush] (in Armenian). Yerevan State University.
- Thierry, J. M. (1976). "Le couvent des Saints-Apôtres de Mus". Handes Amsorya (in French).
