= Nematabad, Hamadan =

Nematabad نعمت اباد
- Village
- Location within Iran
- Coordinates: 34°51′53″N 48°01′57″E
- Country: Iran
- Province: Hamadan
- County: Asadabad
- Bakhsh: Central
- Rural District: Chaharduli

Population (2006)
  - Total: 234
- Time zone: UTC+3:30 (IRST)
  - Summer (DST): UTC+4:30 (IRDT)

Nematabad (Persian: نعمت اباد, also Romanized as Ne‘matābād) is a village in Chaharduli Rural District, in the Central District of Asadabad County, Hamadan Province, Iran. At the 2006 census, its population was 234, in 53 families.
