= Yenikənd, Agdash =

Yenikənd
- Location within Azerbaijan
- Coordinates: 40°40′53″N 47°16′42″E
- Country: Azerbaijan
- Rayon: Agdash
- Municipality: Aşağı Nemətabad
- Time zone: UTC+4 (AZT)
  - Summer (DST): UTC+5 (AZT)

Yenikənd (also, Yenikend) is a village in the Agdash Rayon of Azerbaijan. The village forms part of the municipality of Aşağı Nemətabad.
