= Nematabad, Marvdasht =

Nematabad نعمت اباد
- Village
- Location within Iran
- Coordinates: 29°48′54″N 53°09′09″E
- Country: Iran
- Province: Fars
- County: Marvdasht
- Bakhsh: Seyyedan
- Rural District: Rahmat

Population (2006)
  - Total: 55
- Time zone: UTC+3:30 (IRST)
  - Summer (DST): UTC+4:30 (IRDT)

Nematabad (Persian: نعمت اباد, also Romanized as Ne‘matābād) is a village in Rahmat Rural District, Seyyedan District, Marvdasht County, Fars province, Iran. At the 2006 census, its population was 55, in 12 families.
