= Nematabad-e Rigan =

Nematabad-e Rigan نعمت ابادريگان
- Village
- Location within Iran
- Coordinates: 28°36′33″N 59°03′32″E
- Country: Iran
- Province: Kerman
- County: Rigan
- Bakhsh: Central
- Rural District: Rigan

Population (2006)
  - Total: 685
- Time zone: UTC+3:30 (IRST)
  - Summer (DST): UTC+4:30 (IRDT)

Nematabad-e Rigan (Persian: نعمت ابادريگان, also Romanized as Ne‘matābād-e Rīgān; also known as Ne‘matābād) is a village in Rigan Rural District, in the Central District of Rigan County, Kerman Province, Iran. At the 2006 census, its population was 685, in 173 families.
