= Yenikənd, Quba =

Yenikənd
- Municipality
- Location within Azerbaijan
- Coordinates: 41°16′50″N 48°25′31″E
- Country: Azerbaijan
- Rayon: Quba

Population
  - Total: 908
- Time zone: UTC+4 (AZT)
  - Summer (DST): UTC+5 (AZT)

Yenikənd (also, Yengikend and Yenikend) is a village and municipality in the Quba Rayon of Azerbaijan. It has a population of 909.
