= Nematabad, Jahrom =

Nematabad نعمت آباد
- Village
- Location within Iran
- Coordinates: 28°58′04″N 53°06′55″E
- Country: Iran
- Province: Fars
- County: Khafr
- Bakhsh: Central
- Rural District: Aliabad

Population (2016)
  - Total: 673
- Time zone: UTC+3:30 (IRST)

Nematabad (Persian: نعمت آباد, also Romanized as Ne‘matābād) is a village in Aliabad Rural District of Khafr County, Fars province, Iran.

At the 2006 census, its population was 839, in 200 families, when it was in Khafr District, Jahrom County. The 2016 census measured the population of the village as 673 people in 199 households.

In 2019, the district was separated from the county in the establishment of Khafr County, and the rural district was transferred to the new Central District.
