= Yenikənd, Tartar =

Village in Tartar, Azerbaijan

Yenikənd is a village and municipality in the Tartar Rayon of Azerbaijan. It has a population of 422.
