= Nemətabad =

- Municipality
- Location within Azerbaijan
- Coordinates: 40°36′25″N 47°02′04″E
- Country: Azerbaijan
- Rayon: Yevlakh

Population
  - Total: 2,062
- Time zone: UTC+4 (AZT)
  - Summer (DST): UTC+5 (AZT)

Nemətabad (also, Ne’mətabad, Nametabad, and Neymetabad) is a village and municipality in the Yevlakh Rayon of Azerbaijan. It has a population of 2,062. The municipality consists of the villages of Nemətabad and Düzdaq.
