= Yenikənd, Neftchala =

Yenikənd
- Municipality
- Location within Azerbaijan
- Coordinates: 39°23′59″N 49°15′39″E
- Country: Azerbaijan
- Rayon: Neftchala

Population
  - Total: 997
- Time zone: UTC+4 (AZT)
  - Summer (DST): UTC+5 (AZT)

Yenikənd is a village and municipality in the Neftchala Rayon of Azerbaijan. It has a population of 997. The municipality consists of the villages of Yenikənd and Qırmızı Şəfəq.
