= Nematabad-e Dokhtoran =

Nematabad-e Dokhtoran نعمت اباددختران
- Village
- Location within Iran
- Coordinates: 29°30′25″N 55°29′38″E
- Country: Iran
- Province: Kerman
- County: Sirjan
- Bakhsh: Central
- Rural District: Zeydabad

Population (2006)
  - Total: 98
- Time zone: UTC+3:30 (IRST)
  - Summer (DST): UTC+4:30 (IRDT)

Nematabad-e Dokhtoran (Persian: نعمت اباددختران, also Romanized as Ne‘matābād-e Dokhtorān; also known as Ne‘matābād and Ne‘matābād-e Farrokh) is a village in Zeydabad Rural District, in the Central District of Sirjan County, Kerman Province, Iran. At the 2006 census, its population was 98, in 27 families.
