= Nematabad, Rafsanjan =

Nematabad نعمت آباد
- Village
- Location within Iran
- Coordinates: 30°43′21″N 55°53′50″E
- Country: Iran
- Province: Kerman
- County: Rafsanjan
- Bakhsh: Ferdows
- Rural District: Rezvan

Population (2006)
  - Total: 854
- Time zone: UTC+3:30 (IRST)
  - Summer (DST): UTC+4:30 (IRDT)

Nematabad (Persian: نعمت آباد, also Romanized as Ne‘matābād) is a village in Rezvan Rural District, Ferdows District, Rafsanjan County, Kerman Province, Iran. At the 2006 census, its population was 854, in 219 families.
