= Zenob Glak =

Armenian historian

Zenob Glak (Armenian: Զենոբ Գլակ) was an Armenian historian who became the first abbot of the Glak monastery (also known as Surb Karapet Monastery, dedicated to St. John the Baptist ) in the Taron region of Greater Armenia. He began the chronology that would become the History of Taron of John Mamikonean (10th century, the 35th abbot after Zenob). (ed. Langlois, Venice 1832).

Zenob's History is a somewhat legendary account of Armenia's foremost Christian enlightener Gregory the Illuminator, and may have been originally written in Syriac (according to some sources Zenob was of Syrian descent) in the 5th century, though it was Armenized in a later century.
