= Ashagi Khalaj, Salyan =

Aşağı Xələc
- Municipality
- Location within Azerbaijan
- Coordinates: 39°42′57″N 49°06′25″E
- Country: Azerbaijan
- Rayon: Salyan

Population
  - Total: 2,110
- Time zone: UTC+4 (AZT)
  - Summer (DST): UTC+5 (AZT)

Ashagi Khalaj (also, Yenikənd, Bashirabat, Yenikend, Yetimlar, and Yetimlyar) is a village and municipality in the Salyan Rayon of Azerbaijan. It has a population of 2,110. The village was renamed to Ashagi Khalaj by the decision of the Parliament of Azerbaijan on May 11, 2010.
