= Yenikənd, Goranboy =

Yenikənd
- Location within Azerbaijan
- Coordinates: 40°26′31″N 46°38′48″E
- Country: Azerbaijan
- Rayon: Goranboy
- Municipality: Qaraçinar
- Time zone: UTC+4 (AZT)
  - Summer (DST): UTC+5 (AZT)

Yenikənd (also known as Norshen, Yengikend, and Yenik’end) is a village in Goranboy Rayon, Azerbaijan. The village forms part of the municipality of Qaraçinar.
