= Norshen, Shirak =

Norshen Նորշեն
- Location within Armenia Location within Shirak
- Coordinates: 40°32′21″N 43°35′47″E
- Country: Armenia
- Province: Shirak
- Municipality: Ani

Government
  - Mayor: Vahandukht Vardanyan

Population (2018)
  - Total: 1
- Time zone: UTC+4

Norshen (Armenian: Նորշեն) is a village in the Ani Municipality of the Shirak Province of Armenia.

== Demographics ==
Historical population
Year	Pop.	±% p.a.
1897	288	—
1926	303	+0.18%
1939	399	+2.14%
1959	235	−2.61%
1970	135	−4.91%
1979	33	−14.49%
