= Yuxarı Nemətabad =

- Municipality
- Location within Azerbaijan
- Coordinates: 40°42′47″N 47°18′16″E
- Country: Azerbaijan
- Rayon: Agdash

Population
  - Total: 795
- Time zone: UTC+4 (AZT)
  - Summer (DST): UTC+5 (AZT)

Yuxarı Nemətabad (also, Yuxarı Ne’mətabad, Yukhary Neymetabad, and Yukhary-Neymatabad) is a village and municipality in the Agdash Rayon of Azerbaijan. It has a population of 795. The municipality consists of the villages of Yuxarı Nemətabad and Hacılar.
