= Aşağı Nemətabad =

- Municipality
- Location within Azerbaijan
- Coordinates: 40°40′30″N 47°15′39″E
- Country: Azerbaijan
- Rayon: Agdash

Population
  - Total: 948
- Time zone: UTC+4 (AZT)
  - Summer (DST): UTC+5 (AZT)

Aşağı Nemətabad (also, Aşağı Ne’mətabad, Ashaga Neymetabad, Ashagy Neymetabad, Ashagy-Neymatabad, and Ermeni Neymetabad) is a village and a municipality in the Agdash Rayon of Azerbaijan. It has a population of 948. The municipality consists of the villages of Aşağı Nemətabad and Yenikənd.
