= Danyeri =

- Municipality
- Location within Azerbaijan
- Coordinates: 39°30′39″N 45°03′05″E
- Country: Azerbaijan
- Autonomous republic: Nakhchivan
- District: Sharur

Population (2005)
  - Total: 2,874
- Time zone: UTC+4 (AZT)

Danyeri (formerly, Yenikənd) is a municipality and village in the Sharur District of Nakhchivan Autonomous Republic, Azerbaijan. It is located in the near of the Nakhchivan-Sadarak highway, 15 km south-east from the district center, on the plain. Its population engages in farming and animal husbandry. There are secondary school, 3 clubs, library, kindergarten and a medical center in the village. It has a population of 2,874.

== Etymology and History ==
It was built for the workers during the construction of the Water Reservoir of Arpaçay on the Arpachay River. Since 1975, this settlement was named as Yenikənd (new village). Since 2003, the name of the village is officially registered as Danyeri.
