= Ashnak =

Ashnak Աշնակ
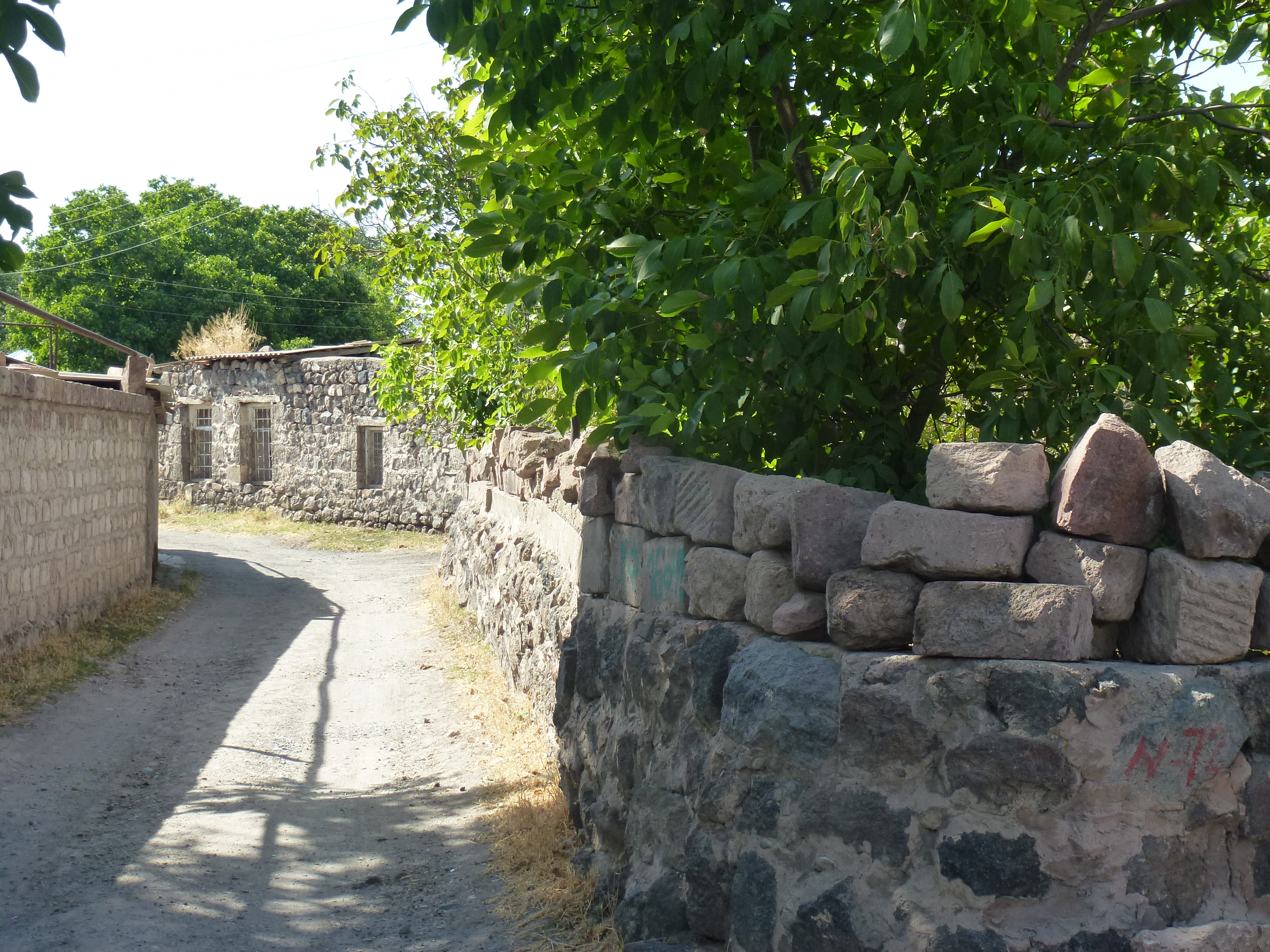
- Ashnak 2015 Aug 01

- Location within Armenia Location within Aragatsotn
- Coordinates: 40°19′39″N 43°55′00″E
- Country: Armenia
- Province: Aragatsotn
- Municipality: Talin

Population (2011)
  - Total: 1,031
- Time zone: UTC+4
  - Summer (DST): UTC+5
- Website: Ashnak.am

Ashnak (Armenian: Աշնակ) is a village in the Talin Municipality of the Aragatsotn Province of Armenia. The village is known from the 5th century, but was relocated to its present site in 1830. The town's environs include the ruins of a 10th-century chapel, a 5th-century church, and ancient fort. Prior to the breakup of the Soviet Union, Ashnak had a folk dance troupe that toured internationally.
