= Kiçikoba =

- Municipality
- Location within Azerbaijan
- Coordinates: 39°23′24″N 45°32′42″E
- Country: Azerbaijan
- Autonomous republic: Nakhchivan
- District: Shahbuz

Population (2005)
  - Total: 176
- Time zone: UTC+4 (AZT)

Kiçikoba (until 2003, Yenikənd and Yenikend) is a village and municipality in the Shahbuz District of Nakhchivan, Azerbaijan. It is located 4 km in the south-west from the district center, on the bank of the Nakhchivanchay River. Its population is busy with gardening and animal husbandry. There are primary school in the village. It has a population of 176. Until 1936, it was called Sicanlı. Since 2003, officially registered in the name of Kicikoba.
