= Ethnographic cartography of the Balkans in the late 19th and early 20th century =

The decline of the Ottoman Empire in the late 19th century led to fierce territorial competition between the Greeks, Serbs, Bulgarians and Turks, in particular over the contested region of Macedonia. As a result, a large number of maps attempting to depict the ethnic demographics of the Balkans were published at this time, particularly from 1876 onwards, following a Serb and Montenegrin uprising and the Russo-Turkish War of 1877-1878. Maps were produced and used by the various sides to justify their claims. The phenomenon has been labelled as a "map mania".

Greeks, Serbs, and Bulgarians tended to manipulate and distort the maps, also relying on fake sources and modifying old data. The maps depicted ethnic groups as blocks of solid colors, obscured ethnic diversity, merged sub-groups into dominant ethnicities, and ignored population density. In order to provide an impression of uniformity and stability, substantial minorities (even up to 49 percent in some cases) and scattered communities were omitted; map scale was adjusted according to the map's aim whether to include or exclude specific minorities.

The maps by Ami Boué and Guillaume Lejean were influential in the early period, and were generally favorable to the Bulgarians, but they greatly exaggerated Albanian presence towards the south, and their reputation suffered as a result. The 1876 map by Heinrich Kiepert was particularly influential and used at the Congress of Berlin. In response, three pro-Greek maps were generated due to Greek efforts (Stanford, Bianconi, Synvet), but these had little impact, and no one outside Greece took them seriously. The standard Greek practice in all the maps it produced was to consider as Greeks not only the Greek-speakers, but also all the Christian Vlachs (Aromanians and Megleno-Romanians), the Christian Albanians, and the Exarchist Slavs, an approach rejected by international figures.

== Maps ==
Image	Date	Cartographer	Comments
	1847	Ami Boué	The first map to show Slavic preponderance in the Balkans (until 1880). Among the maps' major mistakes are that it greatly exaggerated the southward presence of Albanians, while underrepresenting Ottomans and Muslims in Macedonia, Thrace, and northeastern Bulgaria, thereby ruining its reputation. Boué was supported by the Austrian government and served Austrian imperial interests.
	1861	Guillaume Lejean	The map further served to legitimize Bulgarian aspirations. Although it was the first map to rely on historical documents, it confused historical arguments with the contemporary situation, and secondly, incorrectly extended Albanian presence too far southwards.
	1867	Mikhail Mirkovich	Pro-Bulgarian map, which served as the basis of the Slavic Congress of 1867. It expanded the boundaries of the Bulgarian nation past Adrianople, and following Boué's map, also greatly exaggerated Albanian presence west of the Pindus, extending it down to the Gulf of Corinth. As a result, the map's reputation suffered and it was labeled unreliable with regards to the rest of its content.
	1876	Heinrich Kiepert	Kiepert was considered the foremost cartographer of his day, particularly by Bismarck, and his map was used at the 1876 Congress of Berlin.
	1877	Alexandre Synvet	Pro-Greek map. Southern Albanians are not depicted as "Albanians", but as "Greeks" and "Muslims". The coast of the Black sea is indicated as "Greek". The map's coloring with thick and dense cross-hatching makes it more or less useless.
	1877	Carl Sax	Former Austrian consul working for Austrian interests. His map undermined Slavic presence and also attempted to show the complexity of the demographics of Macedonia. The map was generally well-received.
	1877	Ioannis Gennadios, prepared at Stanfords Geographical Establishment	Extreme pro-Greek map, which covers most of the Balkan peninsula with the color associated with the Greeks. Cartographers Sax and Kiepert 'dismissed the map as utter nonsense'.
	1878	Constantine Paparrigopoulos	Extreme pro-Greek map, falsely attributed to Heinrich Kiepert who publicly disclaimed it.
	1880	Ernst Georg Ravenstein	
	1881	Andrees Allgemeiner Handatlas	
	1897	Pallas Nagy Lexikon	
	1898	Paul Vidal de la Blache	
	1911	Encyclopædia Britannica, 1911	
	1911	William Robert Shepherd	
	1916	War Office, London	
	1918	Jovan Cvijić	Pro-Serbian map.
	1918	Jovan Cvijić	Pro-Serbian map.
	1918	George Soteiriades	Pro-Greek map. Less extreme than the previous Greek maps, but continuing the Greek approach that considered Vlachs (Aromanians and Megleno-Romanians), Christian Albanians, and Patriarchate Bulgarians as Greeks, although acknowledging the existence of "Macedonoslavs". It was presented at the Paris conference of 1918 and represented the more realistic approach of Eleftherios Venizelos.
	1918	National Geographic Society	
	1922	J. N. Larned et al.	
	1924	Unknown author - Historische alte Landkarte (Sammlerstück) 1924	
	1932	Der Grosse Herder Atlas	

== Bibliography ==
- Demeter, Gábor; Bottlik, Zsolt (2021). Maps in the Service of the Nation: The Role of Ethnic Mapping in Nation-Building and Its Influence on Political Decision-Making Across the Balkan Peninsula (1840–1914). Berlin: Frank & Timme. ISBN 9783732906659.
- Heraclides, Alexis (2020). The Macedonian Question and the Macedonians: A History. Routledge Histories of Central and Eastern Europe. Routledge. ISBN 9781000289404.
- Peckham, Robert Shannan (2000). "Map mania: nationalism and the politics of place in Greece, 1870–1922" (PDF). Political Geography. 19: 77–95. doi:10.1016/S0962-6298(99)00036-0. Archived from the original (PDF) on 5 February 2009.
- Wilkinson, H.R. (1951). Maps and Politics; a review of the ethnographic cartography of Macedonia. Liverpool University Press. pp. 68–74.
- Yosmaoǧlu, I. K. (2010). "Constructing national identity in Ottoman Macedonia". In Zartman, I. William (ed.). Understanding Life in the Borderlands: Boundaries in Depth and in Motion. University of Georgia Press. ISBN 9780820336145.
