= Decline and modernization of the Ottoman Empire =

In the 19th century, the Ottoman Empire faced threats on numerous frontiers from multiple industrialized European powers as well as from internal instabilities. Outsider influence, internal corruption and the rise of nationalism demanded the Empire to look within itself and modernize. Kickstarting a period of internal reforms to centralize and standardize governance, European style training regimens for the military, standardized law codes and reformed property laws were initiated to better collect taxes and control the resources within the borders. The period of these reforms is known as the Tanzimat, under the reign of the sultans Abdülmecid I and Abdülaziz, starting in 1839.

Despite the Ottoman Empire's precarious international position, the central state was not strengthened. The process of reform and modernization in the empire began with the declaration of the Nizam-I Cedid (New Order) during the reign of Sultan Selim III and was punctuated by several reform decrees, such as the Hatt-ı Şerif of Gülhane in 1839 and the Hatt-ı Hümayun in 1856. Over the course of the 19th century, the Ottoman state became increasingly powerful and rationalized, exercising a greater degree of influence over its population than in any previous era.

Despite these attempts at revitalization, the empire could not stem the rising tide of nationalism, especially among the ethnic minorities in its Balkan provinces, where the newly implemented administrative and infrastructural reforms often intensified local tensions and nationalist movements rather than alleviating them. At the same time, neighboring Balkan states actively fostered separatism through schools, churches, and armed bands, particularly in contested regions like Macedonia, turning local society into a battleground of rival national projects. Numerous revolts and wars of independence, together with repeated incursions by Russia in the northeast and France (and later Britain) in the North African eyalets, such as Algiers, Tunis, and Tripoli (Tripolitania) resulted in a steady loss of territories throughout the 19th and early 20th centuries.

By 1908, the Ottoman military had become modernized and professionalized along the lines of Western European armies. The period was followed by the defeat and dissolution of the Ottoman Empire (1908–1922).

== Main issues of the period ==
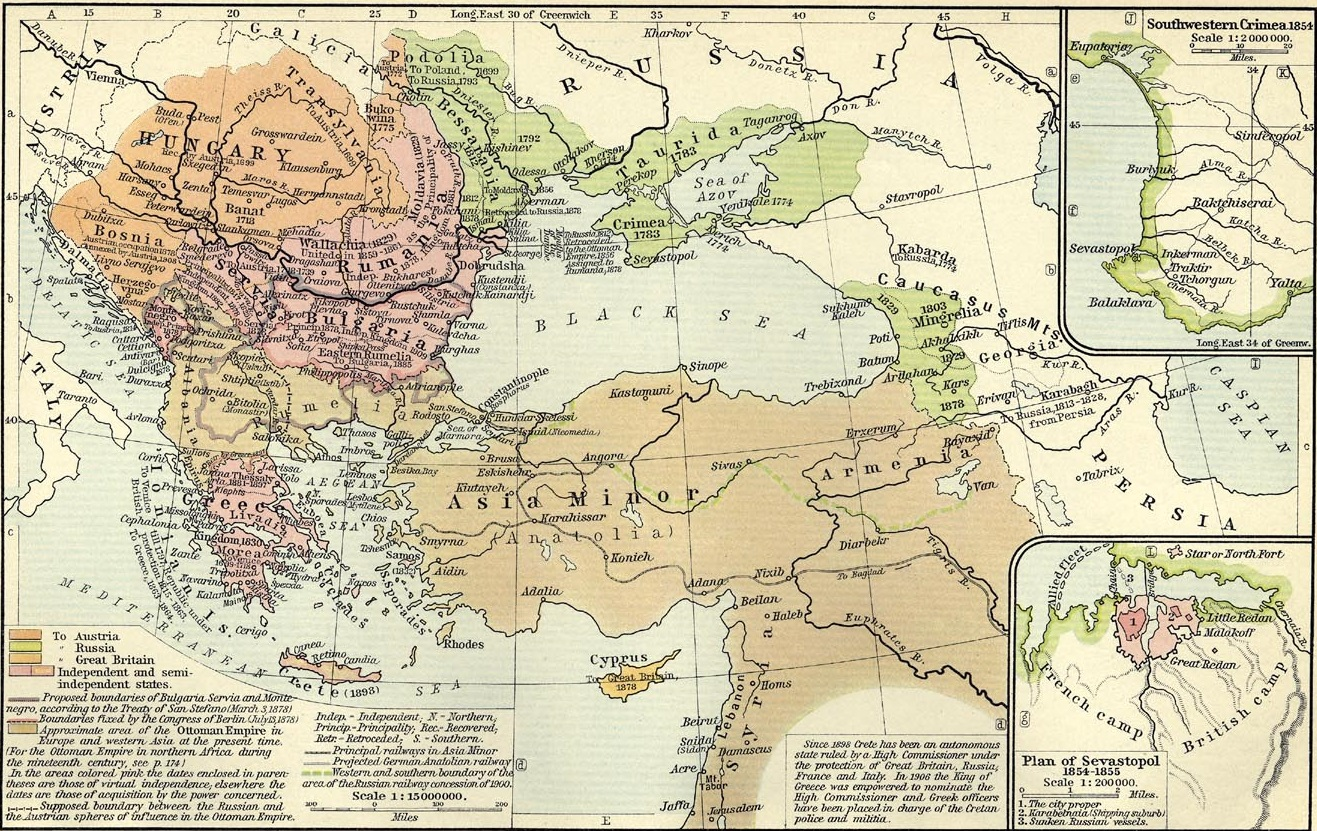
The decline of the Ottoman Empire in the 17th, 18th, and 19th centuries

The rise of nationalism, inspired in part by the French Revolution and the spread of romantic and liberal ideas across Europe, swept through many countries during the 19th century, and it affected territories within the Ottoman Empire, contributing to movements such as the Greek War of Independence and the Serbian Revolution. A burgeoning national consciousness, together with a growing sense of ethnic nationalism, made nationalistic thought one of the most significant ideas imported to the Ottoman Empire. The empire was forced to deal with nationalism from both within and beyond its borders. The number of revolutionary, secret societies which then turned into formal political parties—such as the Committee of Union and Progress emerging from the Young Turk movement and the Internal Macedonian Revolutionary Organization in the Balkans— during the next period rose dramatically.Uprisings in Ottoman territory had many far-reaching consequences during the 19th century and determined much of the Ottoman policy during the early 20th century. Much of the Ottoman ruling elite questioned whether the policies of the state were to blame: some felt that the sources of ethnic conflict were external and unrelated to issues of governance. While this era was not without some successes, the ability of the Ottoman state to have any effect on ethnic uprisings was seriously called into question.

The Russian extension in this century developed with the main theme of supporting the independence of the Ottomans' former provinces, and then bringing all of the Slav peoples of the Balkans under Bulgaria or using Armenians in the east to set the stage. At the end of the century, from the Russian perspective, Romania, Serbia, and Montenegro and the autonomy of Bulgaria were achieved. That alarmed the Great Powers. After the Congress of Berlin, the Russian expansion was controlled by stopping the expansion of Bulgaria. The Russian public felt that at the end of Congress of Berlin thousands of Russian soldiers had died for nothing.

The military of the Ottoman Empire remained an effective fighting force until the second half of the 18th century when it suffered a catastrophic defeat against Russia in the 1768-74 war. Selim III came to the throne with an ambitious effort for military reforms in 1789. He failed and was replaced by Mahmud II in 1808 who established martial law through Alemdar Mustafa Pasha. At first, he allied with the Janissaries to break the power of the provincial governors and then turned on the Janissaries and removed them altogether during the 1826 Auspicious Incident. Efforts for a new system (1826–1858) began following the Auspicious Incident.

Economic historian Paul Bairoch argues that free trade contributed to deindustrialization in the Ottoman Empire. In contrast to the protectionism of China, Japan, and Spain, the Ottoman Empire had a liberal trade policy, open to foreign imports.This policy had its origins in the capitulations of the Ottoman Empire, dating back to the first commercial treaties signed with France in 1536 and taken further with capitulations in 1673 and 1740, which lowered duties to 3% for imports and exports. The liberal Ottoman policies were praised by British economists such as John Ramsay McCulloch in his Dictionary of Commerce (1834), but later criticized by British politicians such as Prime Minister Benjamin Disraeli, who cited the Ottoman Empire as "an instance of the injury done by unrestrained competition" in the 1846 Corn Laws debate:

There has been free trade in Turkey, and what has it produced? It has destroyed some of the finest manufactures in the world. As late as 1812 these manufactures existed, but they have been destroyed. That was the consequence of competition in Turkey, and its effects have been as pernicious as the effects of the contrary principle in Spain.

The Ottoman public debt loomed large during this period. The Empire had previously not taken foreign loans. But with the demands of the Crimean War, the Empire took its first loans in 1854. The public debt quickly ballooned, becoming larger than any other European nation's. The Panic of 1873 depressed the economy, and was followed by poor harvests. The Ottomans found themselves unable to repay the loans, and so defaulted on their debt in 1875. The Ottomans owed their loans to various European countries and their citizens, who were deeply upset at the failure of their investment and lobbied their governments to intervene. This effort became the Ottoman Public Debt Administration, which grew to become a major and independent arm of the Ottoman bureaucracy, whose sole goal was providing returns to European creditors.

The stagnation and reform of the Ottoman Empire (1683–1827) ended with the dismemberment of Ottoman Classical Army. The issue during the decline and modernization of the Ottoman Empire (1828–1908) was to create a military (a security apparatus) that could win wars and bring security to its subjects. That goal took multiple Sultans with multiple reorganizations during this period. At the end of this period, with the Second Constitutional Era in 1908, Ottoman military became modernized and professionalized in the form of European Armies.

== Modernization 1808–1839 ==
=== 1808–1839 Mahmud II ===
Mahmud II had to deal with multiple issues inherited from generations past. These issues lasted all through his reign. Shortly, the Eastern Question with Russia, England, and France, and military problems arising from mutinous Janissaries and factious Ulema. He also faced numerous internal conflicts with Egyptians, Najdis, Serbians, Albanians, Greeks, and Syrians, and had administrative problems from rebellious Pashas, who would fain have founded new kingdoms on the ruins of the House of Osman.

Mahmud understood the growing problems of the state and the approaching overthrow of the monarchy and began to deal with the problems as he saw them. For example, he closed the Court of Confiscations, and took away much of the power of the Pashas. He personally set an example of reform by regularly attending the Divan, or state council. The practice of the sultan's avoiding the Divan had been introduced two centuries prior, during the reign of Suleiman I, and was considered to be one of the causes of the decline of the Empire. Mahmud II also addressed some of the worst abuses connected with the Vakifs, by placing their revenues under state administration. However, he did not venture to apply this vast mass of property to the general purposes of the government.

==== Serbs, 1810s ====
In 1804 the First Serbian Uprising against Ottoman rule erupted in the Balkans, marking the beginning of the Serbian Revolution. Although initially the uprising was suppressed in 1813, the Serbian revolutionary movement resumed with the Second Serbian Uprising in 1815, led by Miloš Obrenović.

By 1817, when the revolution ended, Serbia was raised to the status of self-governing monarchy under nominal Ottoman suzerainty. In 1821 the First Hellenic Republic became the first Balkan country to achieve its independence from the Ottoman Empire. It was officially recognized by the Porte in 1829, after the end of the Greek War of Independence.

==== Greeks, 1820s ====
In 1814, a secret organization called the Filiki Eteria was founded with the aim of liberating Greece. The Filiki Eteria planned to launch revolts in the Peloponnese, the Danubian Principalities, and capital with its surrounding areas. The first of these revolts began on 6 March 1821 in the Danubian Principalities which was put down by the Ottomans. On 17 March 1821, the Maniots declared war which was the start of revolutionary actions in other controlled states.

In October 1821, Theodoros Kolokotronis had captured Tripolitsa, followed by other revolts in Crete, Macedonia, and Central Greece. Tensions soon developed among different Greek factions, leading to two consecutive civil wars. Mehmet Ali of Egypt agreed to send his son Ibrahim Pasha to Greece with an army to suppress the revolt in return for territorial gain. By the end of 1825, most of the Peloponnese was under Egyptian control, and the city of Missolonghi was put under siege and fell in April 1826. Ibrahim had succeeded in suppressing most of the revolt in the Peloponnese and Athens had been retaken. Russia, Britain and France decided to intervene in the conflict and each nation sent a navy to Greece. Following news that combined Ottoman–Egyptian fleets were going to attack the Greek island of Hydra, the allied fleet intercepted the Ottoman–Egyptian fleet in the battle of Navarino. Following a week-long standoff, a battle began which resulted in the destruction of the Ottoman–Egyptian fleet. With the help of a French expeditionary force proceeded to the captured part of Central Greece by 1828.

The Greek War of Independence saw the beginning of the spread of the Western notion of nationalism, stimulated the rise of nationalism under the Ottoman Empire, and eventually caused the breakdown of the Ottoman millet concept. Unquestionably, the concept of nationhood prevalent in the Ottoman Empire was different from the current one as it was centered on religion.

==== The Auspicious Incident, 1826 ====
Mahmud II's most notable achievements include the abolition of the Janissary corps in 1826, the establishment of a modern Ottoman army, and the preparation of the Tanzimat reforms in 1839. By 1826, the sultan was ready to move against the Janissary in favor of a more modern military. Mahmud II incited them to revolt on purpose, describing it as the sultan's "coup against the Janissaries". The sultan informed them, through a fatwa, that he was forming a new army, organized and trained along modern European lines. As predicted, they mutinied, advancing on the sultan's palace. In the ensuing fight, the Janissary barracks were set in flames by artillery fire resulting in 4,000 Janissary fatalities. The survivors were either exiled or executed, and their possessions were confiscated by the Sultan. This event is now called the Auspicious Incident. The last of the Janissaries were then put to death by decapitation in what was later called the Blood Tower, in Thessaloniki.

These marked the beginning of modernization and had immediate effects such as introducing European-style clothing, architecture, legislation, institutional organization, and land reform.

==== Russia, 1828–1829 ====
The Russo-Turkish War of 1828–1829 did not give him time to organize a new army, and the Sultan was forced to use these young and undisciplined recruits in the fight against the veterans of the Tsar. The war was brought to a close by the disastrous Treaty of Adrianople. While the reforms in question were mainly implemented to improve the military, the most notable development that arose out of these efforts was a series of schools teaching everything from math to medicine to train new officers.

==== Egypt, 1830s ====
Later in his reign, Mahmud became involved in disputes with the Wāli of Egypt and Sudan, Muhammad Ali, who was technically Mahmud's vassal. The Sultan had asked for Muhammad Ali's help in suppressing a rebellion in Greece, but had not paid the promised price for his services. In 1831, Muhammad Ali declared war and managed to take control of Syria and Arabia by the war's end in 1833. In 1839, Mahmud resumed the war, hoping to recover his losses, but he died at the time news was on its way to Constantinople that the Empire's army had been defeated at Nezib by an Egyptian army led by Muhammad Ali's son, Ibrahim Pasha.

=== Economy ===
In his time the financial situation of the Empire was dire, and certain social classes had long been oppressed by burdensome taxes. In dealing with the complicated questions that arose, Mahmud II is considered to have demonstrated the best spirit of the best of the Köprülüs. A Firman of 22 February 1834 abolished the vexatious charges which public functionaries when traversing the provinces, had long been accustomed to taking from the inhabitants. By the same edict all collection of money, except for the two regular half-yearly periods, was denounced as an abuse. "No one is ignorant," said Sultan Mahmud II in this document, "that I am bound to afford support to all my subjects against vexatious proceedings; to endeavor unceasingly to lighten, instead of increasing their burdens, and to ensure peace and tranquility. Therefore, those acts of oppression are at once contrary to the will of God, and to my imperial orders."

The haraç, or capitation tax, though moderate and exempting those who paid it from military service, had long been made an engine of gross tyranny through the insolence and misconduct of government collectors. The Firman of 1834 abolished the old mode of levying it and ordained that it should be raised by a commission composed of the Kadı, the Muslim governors, and the Ayans, or municipal chiefs of Rayas in each district. Many other financial improvements were affected. By another important series of measures, the administrative government was simplified and strengthened, and a large number of sinecure offices were abolished. Sultan Mahmud II gave a valuable personal example of good sense and economy, organized the imperial household, suppressed all titles without duties, and eliminated all the positions of salaried officials without functions.

== Tanzimat Era 1839–1876 ==
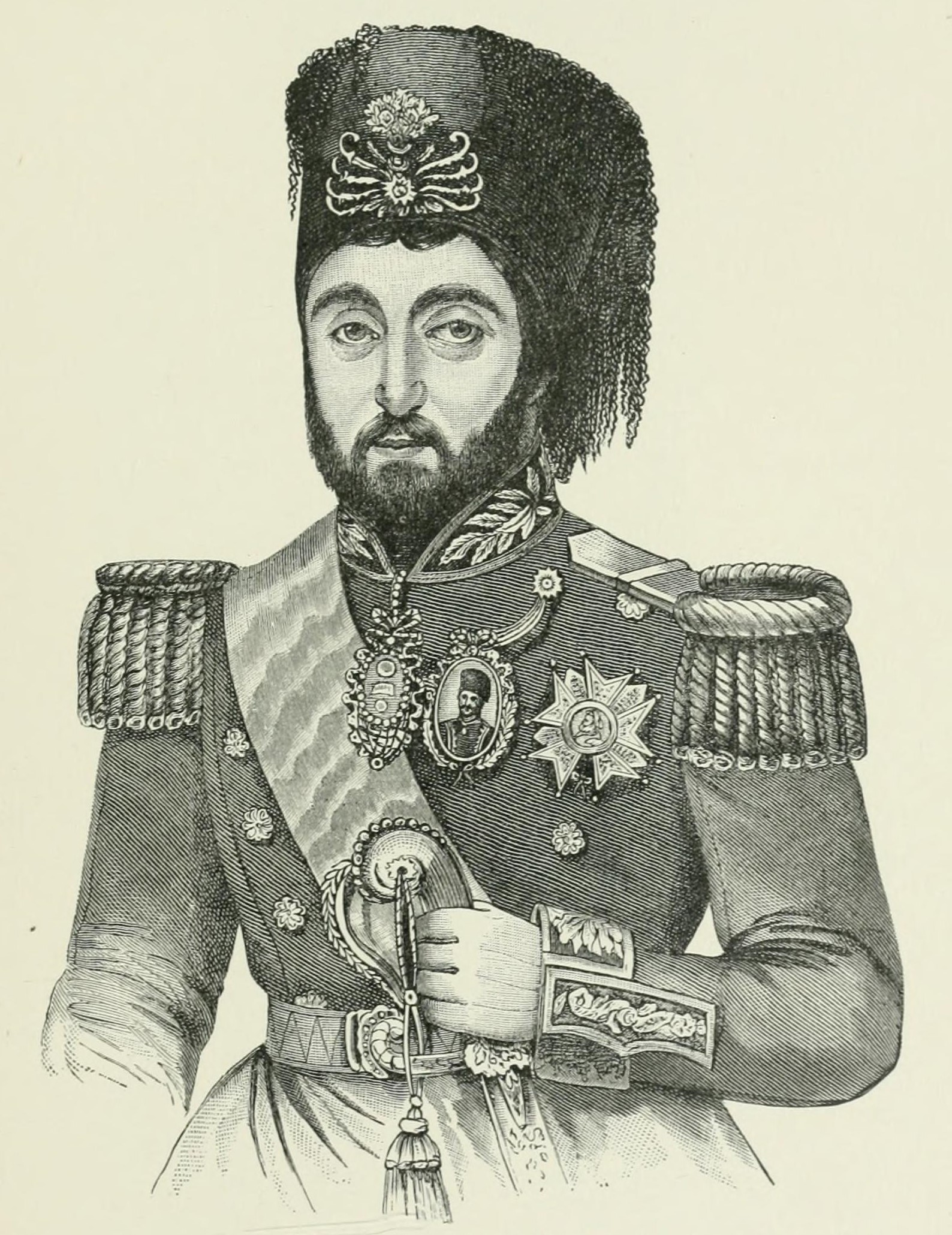
Mustafa Reşid Pasha, the principal architect of the Edict of Gülhane

In 1839, the Hatt-i Sharif proclamation launched the Tanzimat (from Arabic: تنظيم tanẓīm, meaning "organisation") (1839–76), period. Previous to the first of the firmans, the property of all persons banished or condemned to death was forfeited to the Caliph, which kept a motive for acts of cruelty, besides encouraging delators. The second firman removed the ancient rights of Turkish governors to condemn men to instant death at will; the Paşas, the Ağas, and other officers were enjoined that "they should not presume to inflict, themselves, the punishment of death on any man, whether Raya or Turk, unless authorized by a legal sentence pronounced by the kadi, and regularly signed by the judge."

The Tanzimat reforms did not halt the rise of nationalism in the Danubian Principalities and the Principality of Serbia, which had been semi-independent for almost six decades. In 1875, the tributary principalities of Serbia and Montenegro, and the United Principalities of Wallachia and Moldavia, unilaterally declared their independence from the empire. Following the Russo-Turkish War (1877–1878), the empire granted independence to all three belligerent nations. Bulgaria also achieved virtual independence (as the Principality of Bulgaria); its volunteers had participated in the Russo-Turkish War on the side of the rebelling nations.

The government's series of constitutional reforms led to a fairly modern conscripted army, banking system reforms, the decriminalization of homosexuality, the replacement of religious law with secular law and guilds with modern factories.

=== 1839–1861 Abdülmecit I ===
==== 1840s ====
The Ottoman Ministry of Post was established in Istanbul on 23 October 1840. The first post office was the Postahane-i Amire near the courtyard of the Yeni Mosque.

The introduction of the first Ottoman paper banknotes (1840) and opening of the first post offices (1840); the reorganization of the finance system according to the French model (1840); the reorganization of the Civil and Criminal Code according to the French model (1840); the establishment of the Meclis-i Maarif-i Umumiye (1841) which was the prototype of the First Ottoman Parliament (1876); the reorganisation of the army and a regular method of recruiting, levying the army and fixing the duration of military service (1843–44); the adoption of an Ottoman national anthem and Ottoman national flag (1844); the institution of a Council of Public Instruction (1845) and the Ministry of Education (Mekatib-i Umumiye Nezareti, 1847, which later became the Maarif Nezareti, 1857); the Disestablishment of the Istanbul Slave Market and the Suppression of the slave trade in the Persian Gulf (1847); the establishment of the first modern universities (darülfünun, 1848), academies (1848) and teacher schools (darülmuallimin, 1848).

Samuel Morse received his first ever patent for the telegraph in 1847, at the old Beylerbeyi Palace (the present Beylerbeyi Palace was built in 1861–1865 on the same location) in Istanbul, which was issued by Sultan Abdülmecid who personally tested the new invention. Following this successful test, installation works of the first telegraph line (Istanbul-Adrianople–Şumnu) began on 9 August 1847.

==== Identity Card and Ottoman Census, 1844 ====
While the Ottoman Empire had population records prior to the 1830s, it was only in 1831 that the Office of Population Registers fund (Ceride-i Nüfus Nezareti) was founded. The Office decentralized in 1839 to draw more accurate data. Registrars, inspectors, and population officials were appointed to the provinces and smaller administrative districts. They recorded births and deaths periodically and compared lists indicating the population in each district. These records were not a total count of the population. Rather, they were based on what is known as "head of household". Only the ages, occupation, and property of the male family members only were counted.

The first nationwide Ottoman census was in 1844. The first national identity cards which officially named the Mecidiye identity papers, or informally kafa kağıdı (head paper) documents.

==== 1850s ====
In 1856, the Hatt-ı Hümayun promised equality for all Ottoman citizens regardless of their ethnicity and religious confession; which thus widened the scope of the 1839 Hatt-ı Şerif of Gülhane. Overall, the Tanzimat reforms had far-reaching effects. Those educated in the schools established during the Tanzimat period included Mustafa Kemal Atatürk and other progressive leaders and thinkers of the Republic of Turkey and of many other former Ottoman states in the Balkans, the Middle East and North Africa. These reforms included guarantees to ensure the Ottoman subjects perfect security for their lives, honor and property;

Establishment of the Ministry of Healthcare (Tıbbiye Nezareti, 1850); the Commerce and Trade Code (1850); establishment of the Academy of Sciences (Encümen-i Daniş, 1851); establishment of the Şirket-i Hayriye which operated the first steam-powered commuter ferries (1851); the first European style courts (Meclis-i Ahkam-ı Adliye, 1853) and supreme judiciary council (Meclis-i Ali-yi Tanzimat, 1853); establishment of the modern Municipality of Istanbul (Şehremaneti, 1854) and Prohibition of the Circassian and Georgian Slave Trade; establishment of the City Planning Council (İntizam-ı Şehir Komisyonu, 1855); the abolition of the capitation (Jizya) tax on non-Muslims, with a regular method of establishing and collecting taxes (1856); non-Muslims were allowed to become soldiers (1856); various provisions for the better administration of the public service and advancement of commerce; the establishment of the first telegraph networks (1847–1855) and railways (1856); the replacement of guilds with factories; the establishment of the Ottoman Central Bank (originally established as the Bank-ı Osmanî in 1856, and later reorganised as the Bank-ı Osmanî-i Şahane in 1863) and the Ottoman Stock Exchange (Dersaadet Tahvilat Borsası, established in 1866); the Land Code (Arazi Kanunnamesi, 1857) and the Prohibition of the Black Slave Trade; permission for private sector publishers and printing firms with the Serbesti-i Kürşad Nizamnamesi (1857); establishment of the School of Economical and Political Sciences (Mekteb-i Mülkiye, 1859).

In 1855 the Ottoman telegraph network became operational and the Telegraph Administration was established.

==== Crimean War, 1853–1856 ====
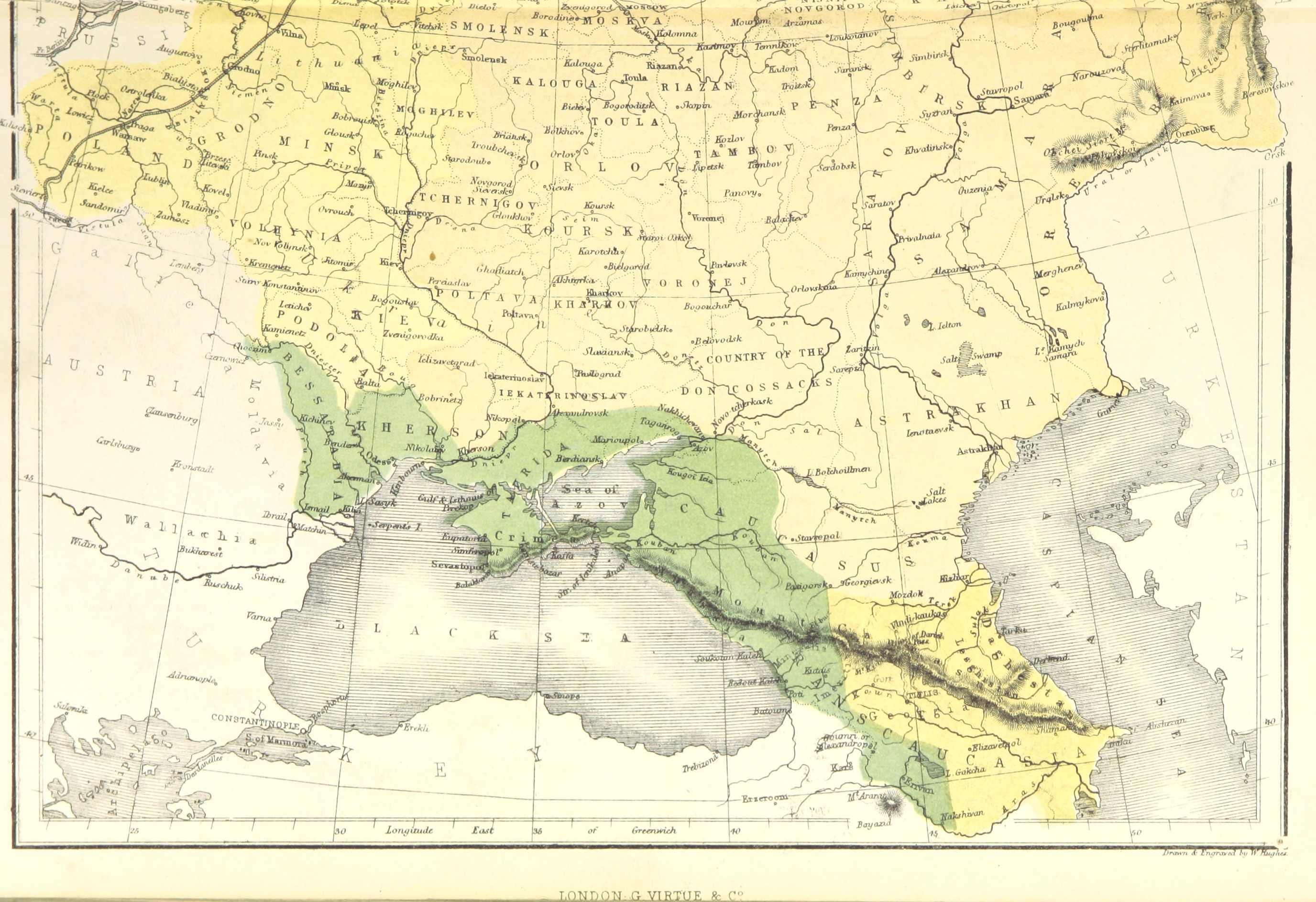
The green color marks the territories that were ceded to Russia following the wars with Turkey from the 17th century to the first half of the 19th century.

The Crimean War (1853–1856) was part of a long-running contest between the major European powers for influence over territories of the declining Ottoman Empire. Britain and France successfully defended the Ottoman Empire against Russia.

Most of the fighting took place when the allies landed on Russia's Crimean Peninsula to gain control of the Black Sea. There were smaller campaigns in western Anatolia, the Caucasus, the Baltic Sea, the Pacific Ocean and the White Sea. It was one of the first "modern" wars, as it introduced new technologies to warfare, such as the first tactical use of railways and the telegraph. The subsequent Treaty of Paris (1856) secured Ottoman control over the Balkan Peninsula and the Black Sea basin. That lasted until defeat in the Russo-Turkish War of 1877–1878.

The Ottoman Empire took its first foreign loans on 4 August 1854, shortly after the beginning of the Crimean War.

The war caused an exodus of the Crimean Tatars. From the total Tatar population of 300,000 in the Tauride Province, about 200,000 Crimean Tatars moved to the Ottoman Empire in continuing waves of emigration. Toward the end of the Caucasian Wars, 90% of the Circassians were exiled from their homelands in the Caucasus and settled in the Ottoman Empire. During the 19th century, there was an exodus to present-day Turkey by a large portion of Muslim peoples from the Balkans, Caucasus, Crimea and Crete. By the early 19th century, as many as 45% of the islanders may have been Muslim, who had a great influence in molding the country's fundamental features. These people were called Muhacir under a general definition. By the time the Ottoman Empire came to an end in 1922, half of the urban population of Turkey was descended from Muslim refugees from Russia. Crimean Tatar refugees in the late 19th century played an especially notable role in seeking to modernize Turkish education.

==== Armenians, 1860s ====
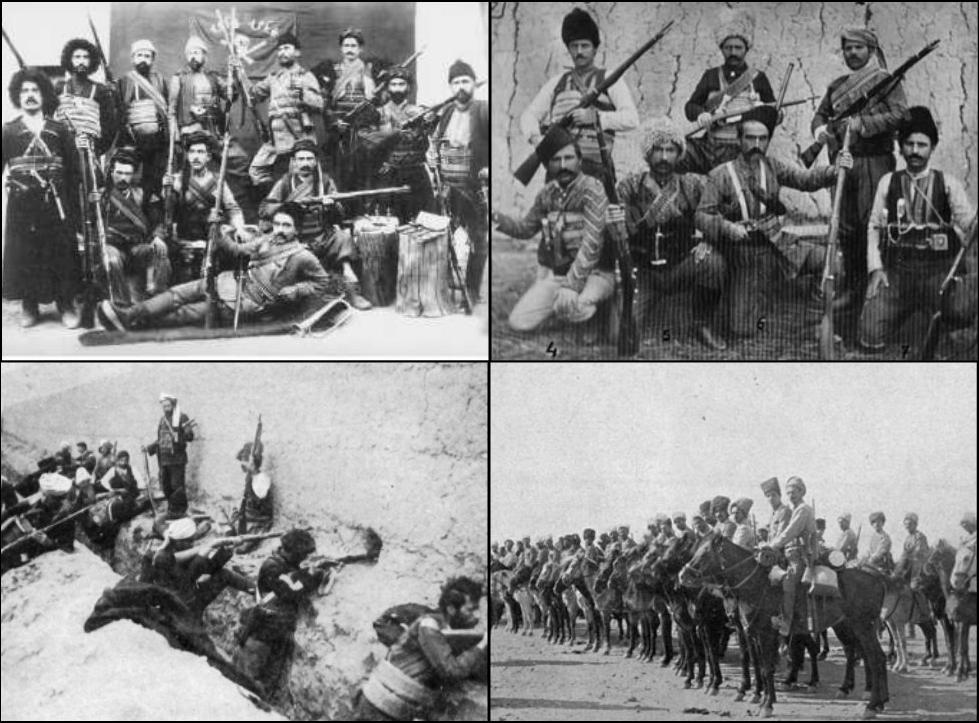
The Armenian national movement

Influenced by the Age of Enlightenment and the rise of nationalism under the Ottoman Empire, the Armenian national liberation movement developed in the early 1860s. The factors contributing to its emergence made the movement similar to that of the Balkan nations, especially the Greeks. The Armenian elite and various militant groups sought to improve and defend the mostly rural Armenian population of Western Armenia the eastern Ottoman Empire from Muslims. The Armenian national liberation movement also sought to recreate an Armenian state in the Armenian-populated areas controlled at the time by the Ottoman and Russian empires.

=== 1861–1876 Abdülaziz ===
Abdülaziz continued the Tanzimat and Islahat reforms. New administrative districts (vilayets) were set up in 1864 and a Council of State was established in 1868. Public education was organized on the French model and Istanbul University was reorganized as a modern institution in 1861. Abdülaziz was also the first sultan who traveled outside his empire. His 1867 trip included a visit to the United Kingdom. The Press and Journalism Regulation Code (Matbuat Nizamnamesi, 1864); among others. 1876 the first international mailing network between Istanbul and the lands beyond the vast Ottoman Empire was established. In 1901 the first money transfers were made through the post offices and the first cargo services became operational. In 1868 homosexuality was decriminalised.

The Christian millets gained privileges, such as in the Armenian National Constitution of 1863. This Divan-approved form of the Code of Regulations consisted of 150 articles drafted by the Armenian intelligentsia. Another institution was the newly formed Armenian National Assembly. The Christian population of the empire, owing to their higher educational levels, started to pull ahead of the Muslim majority, leading to much resentment on the part of the latter. In 1861, there were 571 primary and 94 secondary schools for Ottoman Christians with 140,000 pupils in total, a figure that vastly exceeded the number of Muslim children in school at the same time, who were further hindered by the amount of time spent learning Arabic and Islamic theology. In turn, the higher educational levels of the Christians allowed them to play a large role in the economy. In 1911, of the 654 wholesale companies in Istanbul, 528 were owned by ethnic Greeks.

In 1871 the Ministry of Post and the Telegraph Administration were merged, becoming the Ministry of Post and Telegraph. In July 1881 the first telephone circuit in Istanbul was established between the Ministry of Post and Telegraph in the Soğukçeşme quarter and the Postahane-i Amire in the Yenicami quarter. On 23 May 1909, the first manual telephone exchange with a 50 line capacity entered service in the Büyük Postane (Grand Post Office) in Sirkeci.

==== Bulgaria, 1870s ====
The rise of national awakening of Bulgaria led to the Bulgarian revival movement. Unlike Greece and Serbia, the nationalist movement in Bulgaria did not concentrate initially on armed resistance against the Ottoman Empire. After the establishment of the Bulgarian Exarchate on 28 February 1870, a large-scale armed struggle started to develop as late as the beginning of the 1870s with the establishment of the Internal Revolutionary Organisation and the Bulgarian Revolutionary Central Committee, as well as the active involvement of Vasil Levski in both organizations. The struggle reached its peak with the April Uprising of 1876 in several Bulgarian districts in Moesia, Thrace, and Macedonia. The suppression of the uprising and the atrocities committed by Ottoman soldiers against the civilian population increased the Bulgarian desire for independence.

Refugees

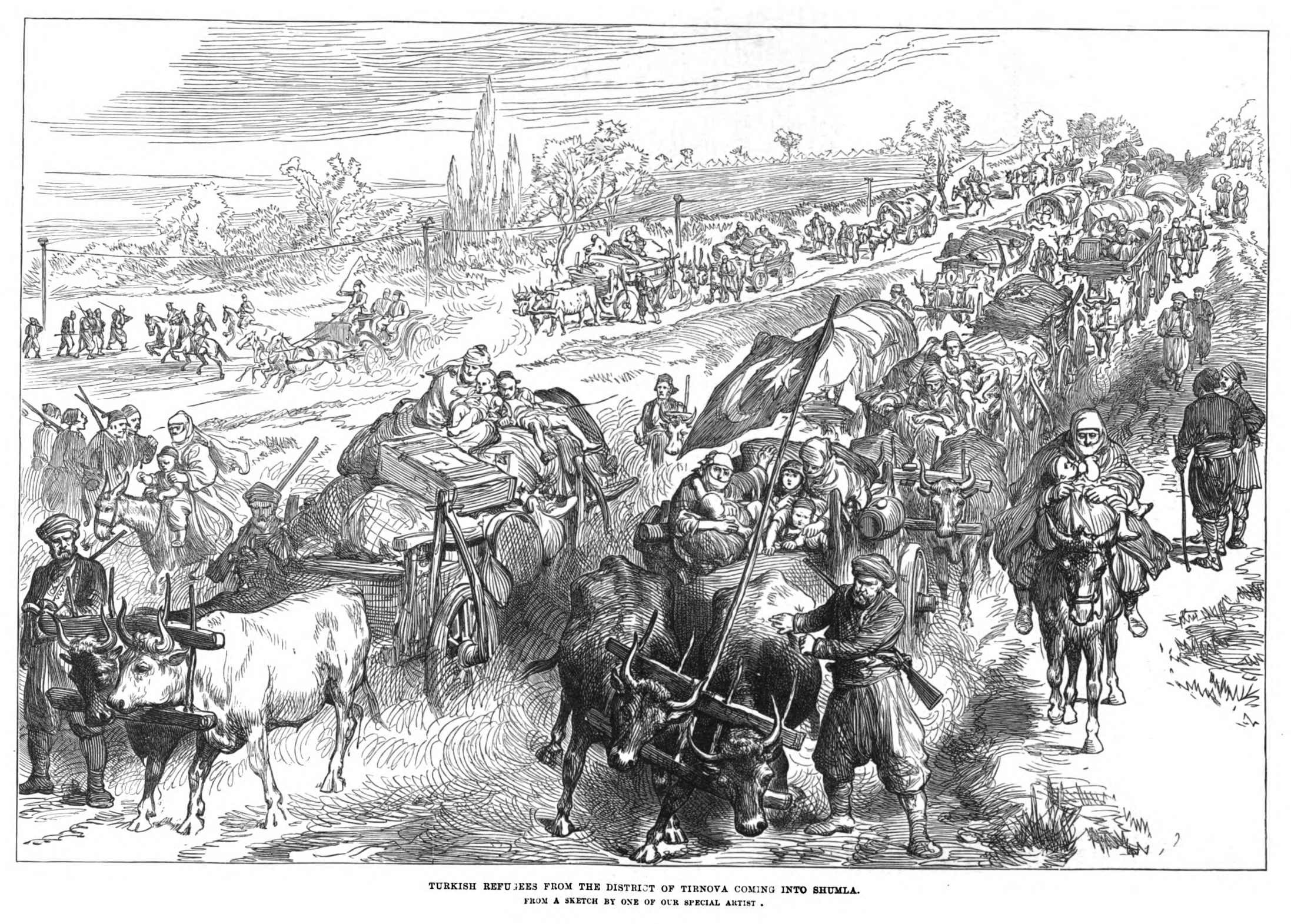
Turkish refugees from Bulgaria

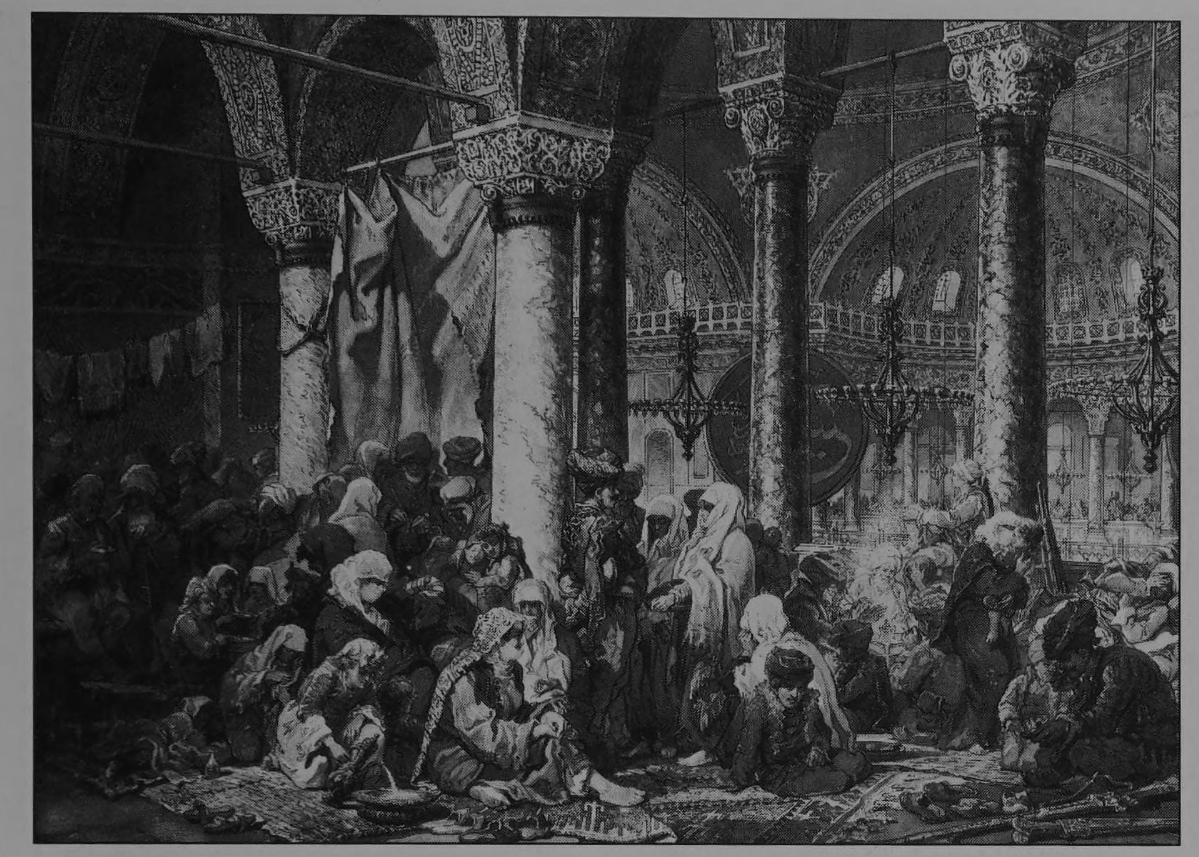
1878-Refugees in Aya Sofya

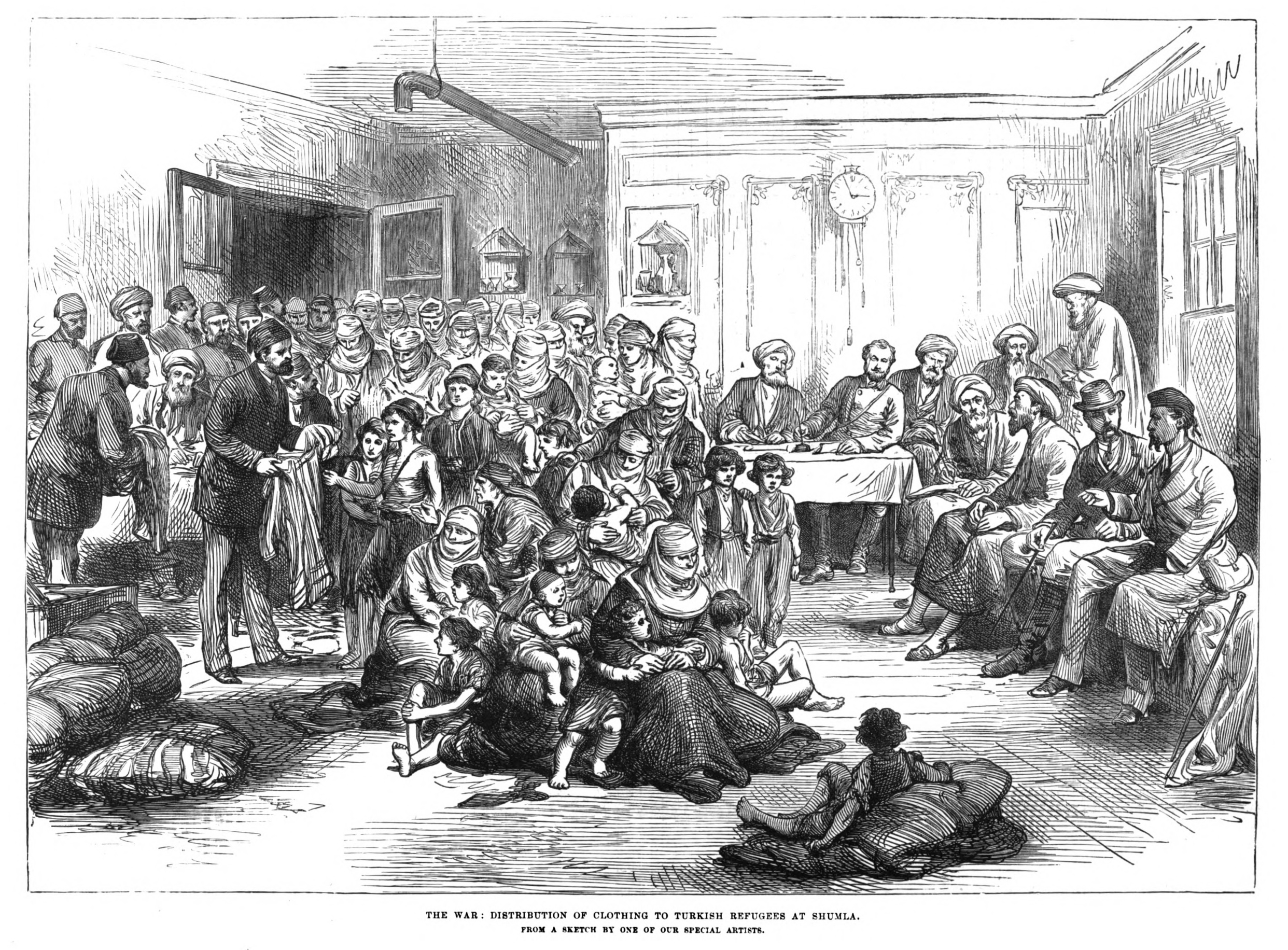
Distribution Clothing to Turkish refugees in Shumen

=== Debt default ===
After the taking of its first loans, the Empire had taken further loans out in 1858, 1860, 1862, 1863, 1865, and every year between 1869 and 1874. But economic trouble loomed. The Panic of 1873 depressed the economy, and poor harvests followed. Palace intrigues diverted political attention from the debt crisis. Finally, on October 6, 1875, the Empire suspended interest payments on its loans, and formally defaulted on October 30, 1875.

The amount defaulted on was estimated at 224.5 million British Pounds (equivalent to £2.6502666667×10^{10} in 2024). But the entire income of the Empire had been a mere 21.7 million British pounds (equivalent to £2.681155556×10^{9} in 2024), a ratio of 10.3. For comparison, the modern debt to income ratio of the United States was around 7.8 in 2022. The default on the Ottoman debt was met by outrage in European nations, to whom the debts were owed. The concerted efforts of the United Kingdom and France, whose citizens were the chief bondholders on the Ottoman debt, would lead to the creation of the Ottoman Public Debt Administration in 1881. It would function as an independent arm of the Ottoman Bureaucracy, whose goal was to secure tax revenue to send back home to its citizen bondholders. Other represented nations were Germany, Italy, Austria, the Netherlands, as well as internal Ottoman bondholders. The Ottoman debt would prove to be a heavy weight on the Empire and only added to the other crises that emerged in the 1870s.

== Ottoman Constitution, 1876 ==
The reformist period peaked with the Constitution, called the Kanûn-u Esâsî (meaning "Basic Law" in Ottoman Turkish), written by members of the Young Ottomans, which was promulgated on 23 November 1876. It established the freedom of belief and equality of all citizens before the law. The empire's First Constitutional era, was short-lived. But the idea of Ottomanism proved influential. A group of reformers known as the Young Ottomans, primarily educated in Western universities, believed that a constitutional monarchy would give an answer to the empire's growing social unrest. Through a military coup in 1876, they forced Sultan Abdülaziz (1861–1876) to abdicate in favour of Murad V. However, Murad V was mentally ill and was deposed within a few months. His heir-apparent, Abdülhamid II (1876–1909), was invited to assume power on the condition that he would declare a constitutional monarchy, which he did on 23 November 1876. The parliament survived for only two years before the sultan suspended it. When forced to reconvene it, he abolished the representative body instead. This ended the effectiveness of the Kanûn-ı Esâsî.

Kanûn-u Esâsî, Constitution

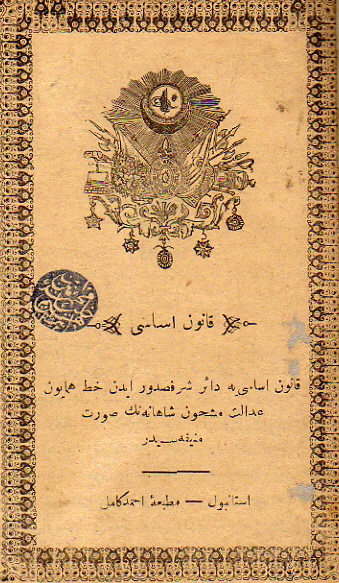
Cover Page

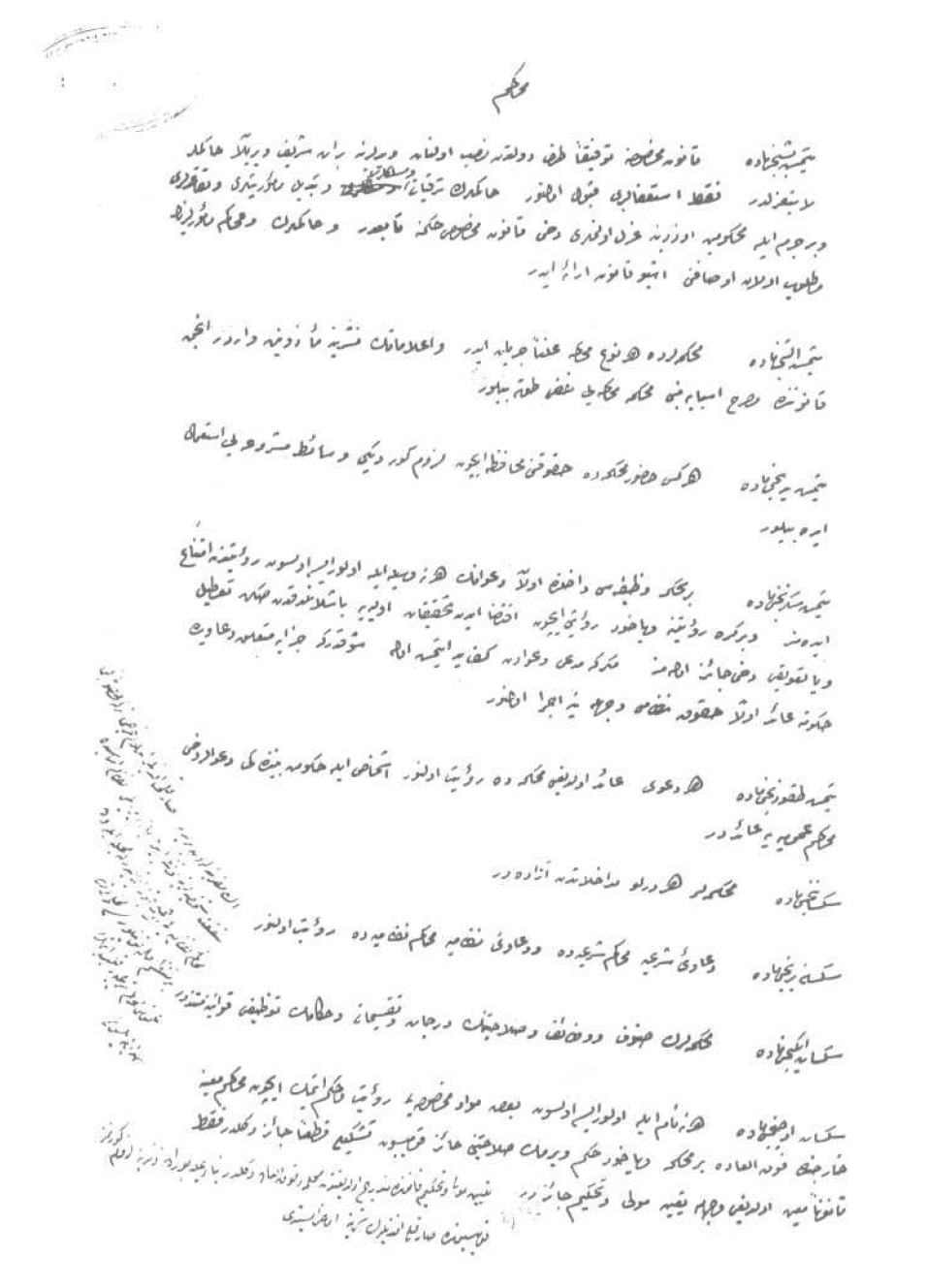
Draft version, with the personal notes.

=== 1876 Murat V ===
After Abdülaziz's dethronement, Murat was enthroned. It was hoped that he would sign the constitution. However, due to health problems, Murat was also dethroned after 93 days; he was the shortest reigning sultan of the Empire.

== First Constitutional Era, 1876–1878 ==
The First Constitutional Era of the Ottoman Empire was the period of constitutional monarchy from the promulgation of the Kanûn-ı Esâsî (meaning "Basic Law" in Ottoman Turkish), written by members of the Young Ottomans, on 23 November 1876 until 13 February 1878. The era ended with the suspension of the Ottoman parliament by Abdülhamid II.

=== 1876–1878 Abdul Hamid II ===
==== Russo-Turkish War 1877–1878 ====
Multiple Fronts of Russo-Turkish War

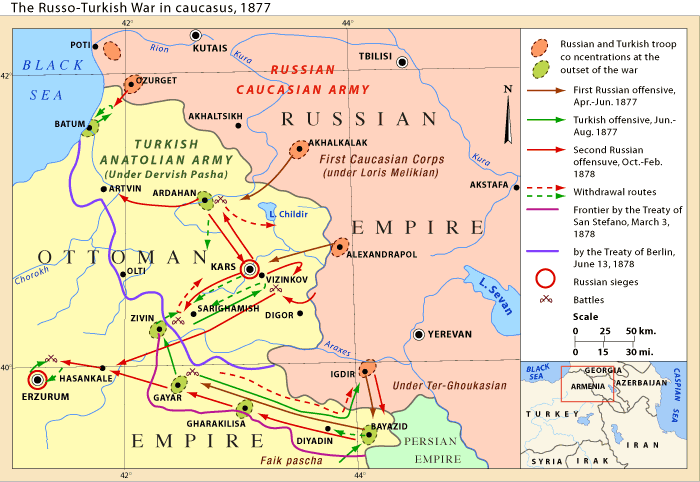
Russo-Turkish War (1877–78)

The Russo-Turkish War of 1877–1878 had its origins in a rise in nationalism in the Balkans as well as in the Russian goal of recovering territorial losses it had suffered during the Crimean War, reestablishing itself in the Black Sea and following the political movement attempting to free Balkan nations from the Ottoman Empire. As a result of the war, the principalities of Romania, Serbia and Montenegro, each of which had had de facto sovereignty for some time, formally proclaimed independence from the Ottoman Empire. After almost half a millennium of Ottoman rule (1396–1878), the Bulgarian state was reestablished as the Principality of Bulgaria, covering the land between the Danube River and the Balkan Mountains (except Northern Dobrudja which was given to Romania) and the region of Sofia, which became the new state's capital. The Congress of Berlin also allowed Austria-Hungary to occupy Bosnia and Herzegovina and Great Britain to take over Cyprus, while the Russian Empire annexed Southern Bessarabia and the Kars region.

==== Congress of Berlin, 1878 ====
Political negotiations

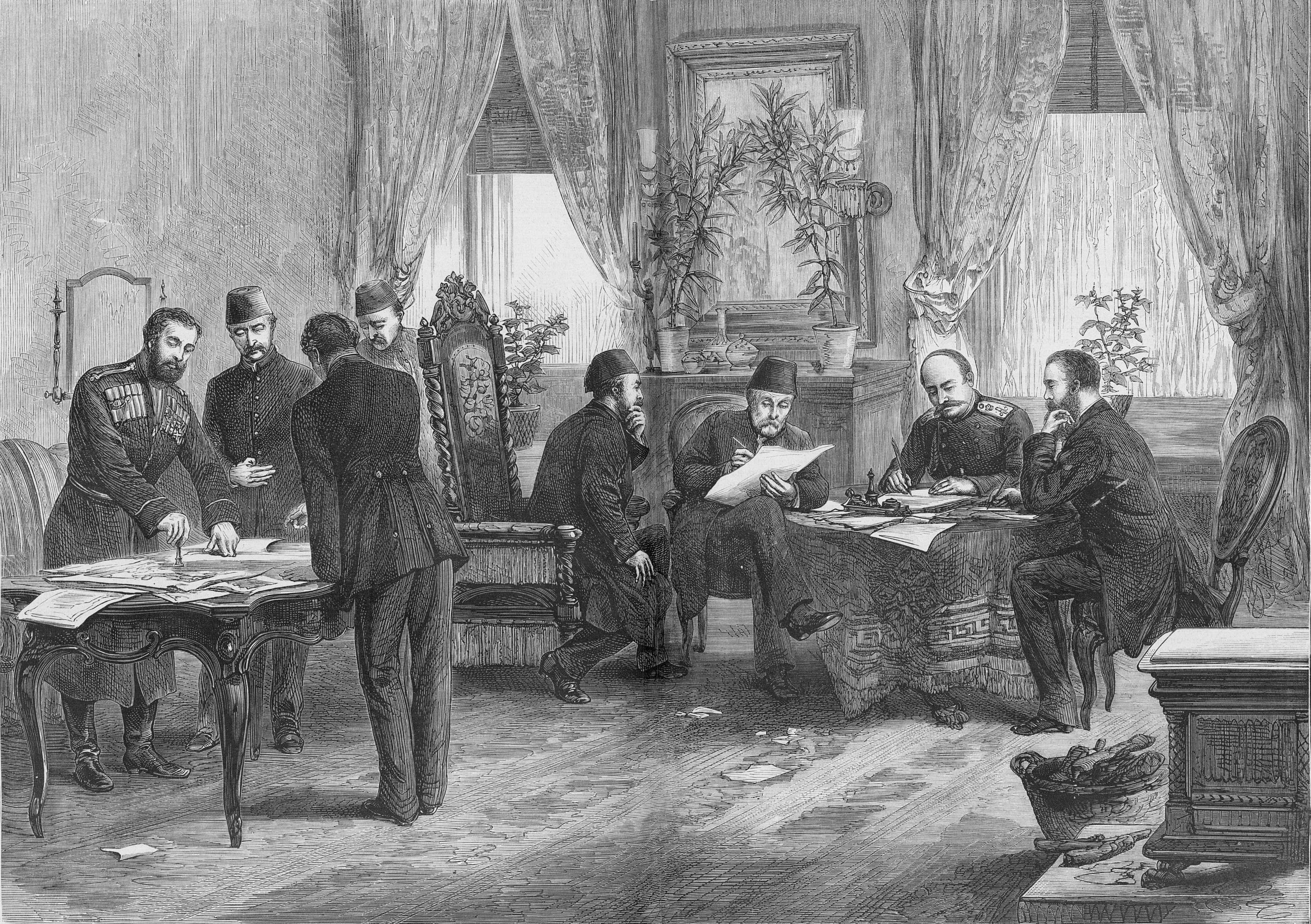
Negotiations for San Stefano Agreement (included "Article 16")

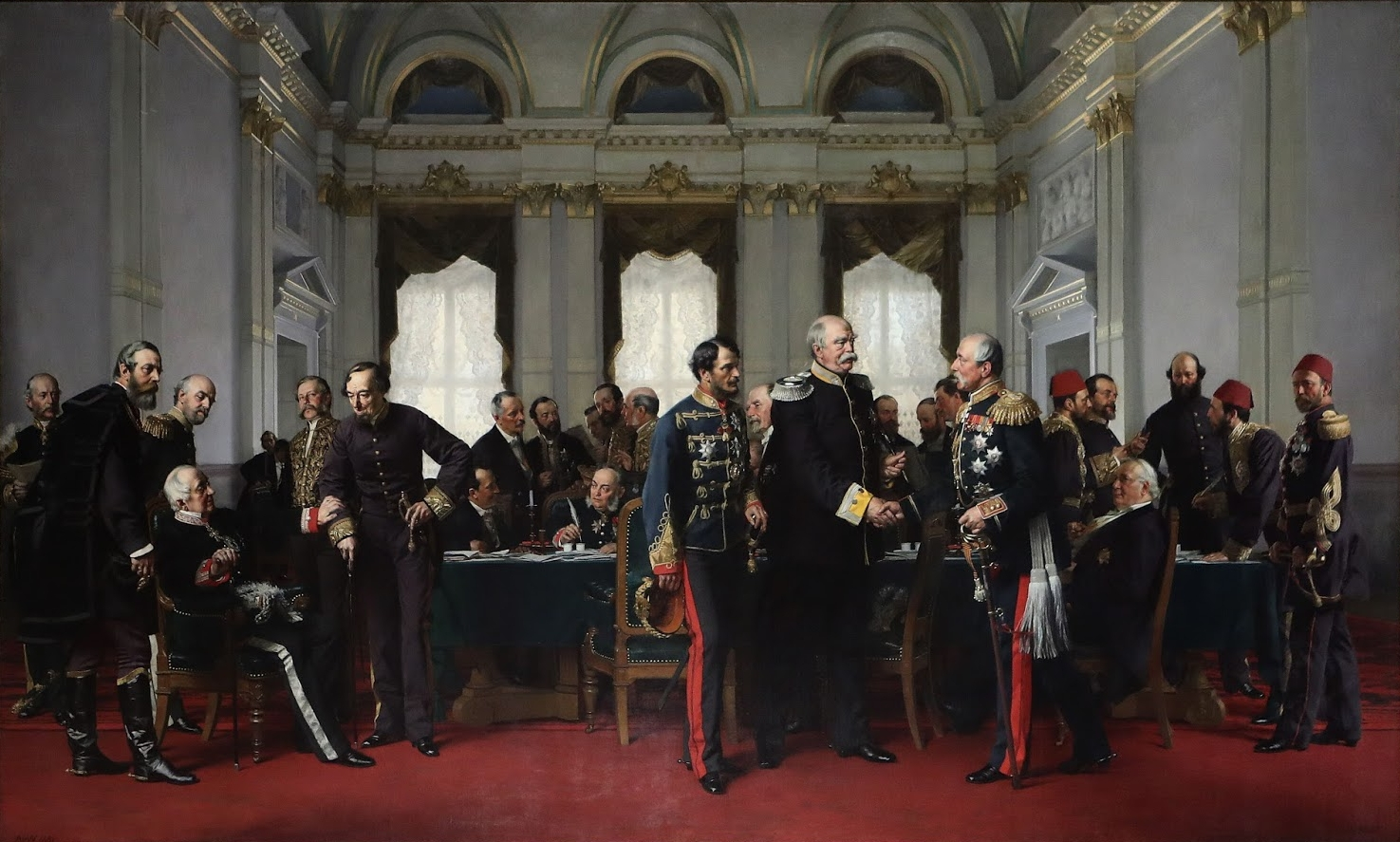
Congress of Berlin led to Treaty of Berlin (1878) (included "Article 61" which was the "Article 16")

The Congress of Berlin (13 June – 13 July 1878) was a meeting of the leading statesmen of Europe's Great Powers and the Ottoman Empire. In the wake of the Russo-Turkish War (1877–1878) that ended with a decisive victory for Russia and her Orthodox Christian allies (subjects of the Ottoman Empire before the war) in the Balkan Peninsula, the urgent need was to stabilize and reorganize the Balkans, and set up new nations. German Chancellor Otto von Bismarck, who led the Congress, undertook to adjust boundaries to minimize the risks of major war, while recognizing the reduced power of the Ottomans, and balance the distinct interests of the great powers.

As a result, Ottoman holdings in Europe declined sharply; Bulgaria was established as an independent principality inside the Ottoman Empire, but was not allowed to keep all its previous territory. Bulgaria lost Eastern Rumelia, which was restored to the Turks under a special administration; and Macedonia, which was returned outright to the Turks, who promised reform. Romania achieved full independence, but had to turn over part of Bessarabia to Russia. Serbia and Montenegro finally gained complete independence, but with smaller territories.

In 1878, Austria-Hungary unilaterally occupied the Ottoman provinces of Bosnia-Herzegovina and Novi Pazar, but the Ottoman government contested this move and maintained its troops in both provinces. The stalemate lasted for 30 years (Austrian and Ottoman forces coexisted in Bosnia and Novi Pazar for three decades) until 1908, when the Austrians took advantage of the political turmoil in the Ottoman Empire that stemmed from the Young Turk Revolution and annexed Bosnia-Herzegovina, but pulled their troops out of Novi Pazar in order to reach a compromise and avoid a war with the Turks.

In return for British Prime Minister Benjamin Disraeli's advocacy for restoring the Ottoman territories on the Balkan Peninsula during the Congress of Berlin, Britain assumed the administration of Cyprus in 1878 and later sent troops to Egypt in 1882 with the pretext of helping the Ottoman government to put down the Urabi Revolt; effectively gaining control in both territories (Britain formally annexed the still nominally Ottoman territories of Cyprus and Egypt on 5 November 1914, in response to the Ottoman Empire's decision to enter World War I on the side of the Central Powers.) France, on its part, occupied Tunisia in 1881.

The results were first hailed as a great achievement in peacemaking and stabilization. However, most of the participants were not fully satisfied, and grievances regarding the results festered until they exploded into world war in 1914. Serbia, Bulgaria, and Greece made gains, but far less than they thought they deserved. The Ottoman Empire called at the time the "Sick man of Europe", was humiliated and significantly weakened, rendering it more liable to domestic unrest and more vulnerable to attack. Although Russia had been victorious in the war that occasioned the conference, it was humiliated at Berlin, and resented its treatment. Austria gained a great deal of territory, which angered the South Slavs, and led to decades of tensions in Bosnia and Herzegovina. Bismarck became the target of hatred of Russian nationalists and Pan-Slavists and found that he had tied Germany too closely to Austria in the Balkans.

In the long run, tensions between Russia and Austria-Hungary intensified, as did the nationality question in the Balkans. The Congress succeeded in keeping Istanbul in Ottoman hands. It effectively disavowed Russia's victory. The Congress of Berlin returned to the Ottoman Empire territories that the previous treaty had given to the Principality of Bulgaria, most notably Macedonia, thus setting up a strong revanchist demand in Bulgaria that in 1912 led to the First Balkan War in which the Turks were defeated and lost nearly all of Europe. As the Ottoman Empire gradually shrank in size, military power, and wealth, many Balkan Muslims migrated to the empire's remaining territory in Balkans or to the heartland in Anatolia. Muslims had been the majority in some parts of Ottoman Empire such as the Crimea, the Balkans, and the Caucasus as well as a plurality in southern Russia and also in some parts of Romania. Most of these lands were lost with time by the Ottoman Empire between the 19th and 20th centuries. By 1923, only Anatolia and eastern Thrace remained as the Muslim land.

== İstibdat Era, 1878–1908 ==
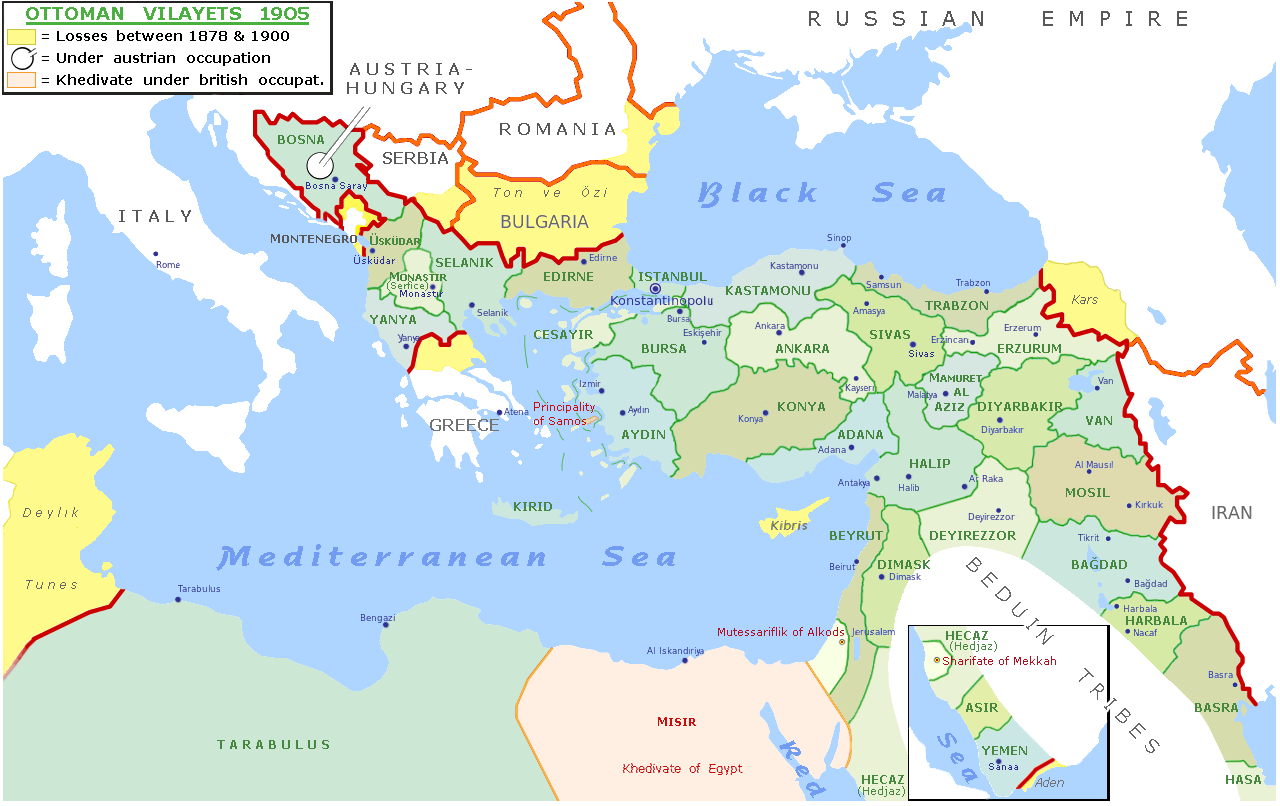
Map of the Ottoman Empire in 1900, with the names of the Ottoman provinces.

=== 1878–1908 Abdul Hamid II ===
The reign of Abdul Hamid II was pejoratively referred to as istibdad (despotism). His reign struggled with the culmination of 75 years of change throughout the empire and an opposing reaction to that change. He was particularly concerned with the centralization of the empire. His efforts to centralize the Sublime Porte were not unheard of among other sultans. The Ottoman Empire's local provinces had more control over their areas than the central government. Abdul Hamid II's foreign relations came from a "policy of non-commitment". The sultan understood the fragility of the Ottoman military, and the Empire's weaknesses of its domestic control. Pan-Islamism became Abdülhamid's solution to the empire's loss of identity and power. His efforts to promote Pan-Islamism were for the most part unsuccessful because of the large non-Muslim population, and the European influence onto the empire. His policies essentially isolated the Empire, which further aided in its decline. Several of the elite who sought a new constitution and reform for the empire were forced to flee to Europe. New groups of radicals began to threaten the power of the Ottoman Empire.

==== Egypt 1880s ====
After gaining some amount of autonomy during the early 1800s, Egypt had entered into a period of political turmoil by the 1880s. In April 1882, British and French warships appeared in Alexandria to support the khedive and prevent the country from falling into the hands of anti-European nationals.

In August 1882 British forces invaded and occupied Egypt on the pretext of bringing order. The British supported Khedive Tewfiq and restored stability, which was especially beneficial to British and French financial interests. Egypt and Sudan remained as Ottoman provinces de jure until 1914, when the Ottoman Empire joined the Central Powers of World War I. Great Britain officially annexed these two provinces and Cyprus in response.

==== 1893–96 Ottoman Census ====
In 1867, the Council of States took charge of drawing population tables, increasing the precision of population records. They introduced new measures of recording population counts in 1874. This led to the establishment of a General Population Administration, attached to the Ministry of Interior in 1881-1882.

The first official census (1881–93) took 10 years to finish. In 1893, the results were compiled and presented. This census is the first modern, general, and standardized census accomplished not for taxation nor for military purposes, but to acquire demographic data. The population was divided into ethno-religious and gender characteristics. Numbers of both male and female subjects are given in ethno-religious categories including Muslims, Greeks, Armenians, Bulgarians, Catholics, Jews, Protestants, Latins, Syriacs and Gypsies.

Geographic and Demographic maps

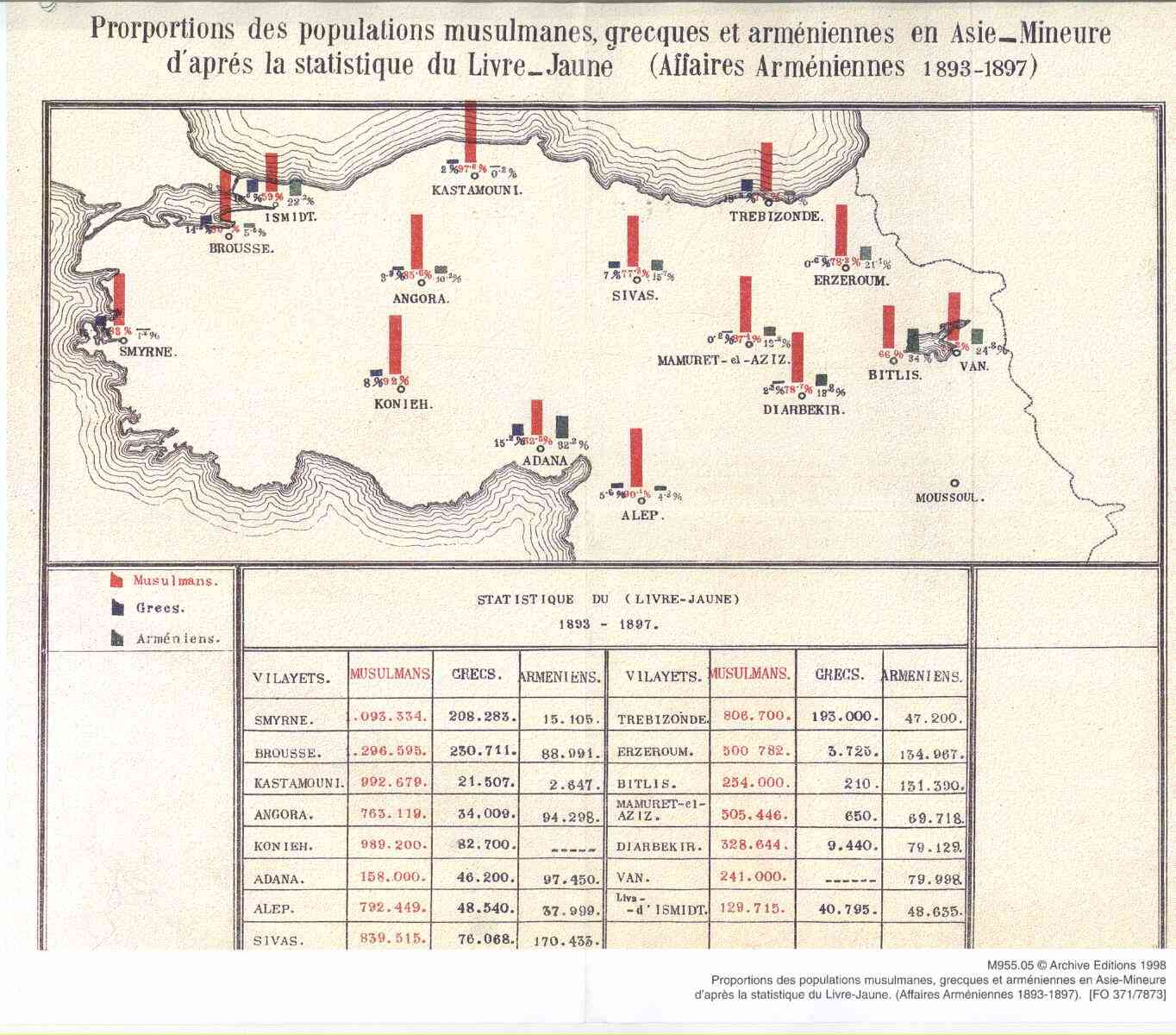
Ottoman Census of 1893-96

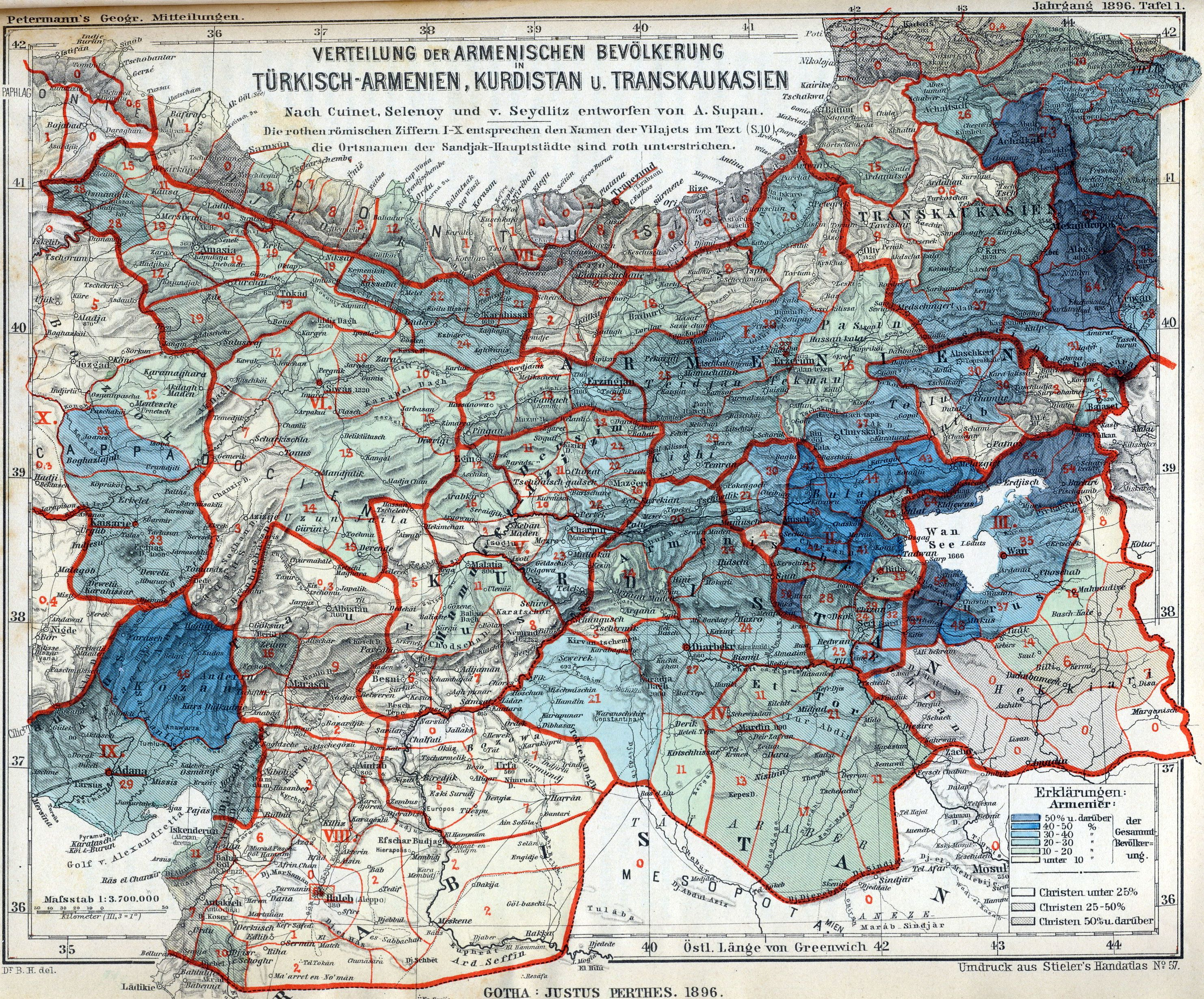
1893-96, Armenian distribution

Map of the Ottoman Empire in 1900, with the names of the Ottoman provinces between 1878 and 1908.

==== Armenians, 1890s ====
Although granted their own constitution and national assembly with the Tanzimat reforms, the Armenians attempted to demand implementation of Article 61 from the Ottoman government as agreed upon at the Congress of Berlin in 1878.

===== Autonomists =====
During 1880 - 1881, while the Armenian national liberation movement was in its early stage; lack of outside support and inability to maintain a trained, organized Kurdish force diminished Kurdish aspirations. However, two prominent Kurdish families (tribes) mounted opposition to the empire, based more on an ethno-nationalistic standpoint. The Badr Khans were secessionists while the Sayyids of Nihiri were autonomists. The Russo-Turkish War of 1877-78 was followed in 1880 - 1881 by the attempt of Shaykh Ubayd Allah of Nihri to found an "independent Kurd principality" around the Ottoman-Persian border (including the Van Vilayet) where Armenian population was significant. Shaykh Ubayd Allah of Nihri gathered 20,000 fighters. Lacking discipline, his man left the ranks after pillaging and acquiring riches from the villages in the region (indiscriminately, including Armenian villages). Shaykh Ubayd Allah of Nihri was captured by the Ottoman forces in 1882 and this movement ended.

The Bashkaleh clash was the bloody encounter between the Armenakan Party and the Ottoman Empire in May 1889. Its name comes from Başkale, a border town of Van Eyalet of the Ottoman Empire. The event was important, as it was reflected on main Armenian newspapers as the recovered documents on the Armenakans showed an extensive plot for a national movement. Ottoman officials believed that the men were members of a large revolutionary apparatus and the discussion was reflected in newspapers, (Eastern Express, Oriental Advertiser, Saadet, and Tarik) and the responses were on the Armenian papers. In some Armenian circles, this event was considered martyrdom and brought other armed conflicts. The Bashkaleh Resistance was on the Persian border, which the Armenakans were in communication with Armenians in the Persian Empire. The Gugunian Expedition, which followed within a couple of months, was an attempt by a small group of Armenian nationalists from the Russian Armenia to launch an armed expedition across the border into the Ottoman Empire in 1890 in support of local Armenians.

The Kum Kapu demonstration occurred at the Armenian quarter of Kum Kapu, the seat of the Armenian Patriarch, was spared through the prompt action of the commandant, Hassan Aga. On 27 July 1890, Harutiun Jangülian, Mihran Damadian and Hambartsum Boyajian interrupted the Armenian mass to read a manifesto and denounce the indifference of the Armenian patriarch and Armenian National Assembly. Harutiun Jangülian (member from Van) tried to assassinate the Patriarch of Istanbul. The goal was to persuade the Armenian clerics to bring their policies into alignment with national politics. They soon forced the patriarch to join the procession heading to the Yıldız Palace to demand implementation of Article 61 of the Treaty of Berlin. It is significant that this massacre, in which 6000 Armenians are said to have perished, was not the result of a general rising of the Muslim population. The Softas took no part in it, and many Armenians found refuge in the Muslim sections of the city.

===== Reform program =====
The Kurdish (force, rebels, bandits) sacked neighboring towns and villages with impunity.

The central assumption of the Hamidiye system—Kurdish tribes (Kurdish chiefdoms cited among Armenian security concerns) could be brought under military discipline—proved to be "Utopian". The Persian Cossack Brigade later proved that it can function as an independent unit, but the Ottoman example, which was modeled after, never replaced the tribal loyalty to Ottoman Sultan or even to its establishing unit.

In 1892, first time a trained and organized Kurdish force encouraged by the Sultan Abdul Hamid II. There are several reasons advanced as to why the Hamidiye light cavalry was created. The establishment of the Hamidiye was in one part a response to the Russian threat, but scholars believe that the central reason was to suppress Armenian socialist/nationalist revolutionaries. The Armenian revolutionaries posed a threat because they were seen as disruptive, and they could work with the Russians against the Ottoman Empire. The Hamidiye corps or Hamidiye Light Cavalry Regiments were well-armed, irregular, majority Kurdish cavalry (minor amounts of other nationalities, such as Turcoman) formations that operated in the eastern provinces of the Ottoman Empire. They were intended to be modeled after the Caucasian Cossack Regiments (example Persian Cossack Brigade) and were firstly tasked to patrol the Russo-Ottoman frontier and secondly, to reduce the potential of Kurdish-Armenian cooperation. The Hamidiye Cavalry was in no way a cross-tribal force, despite their military appearance, organization, and potential. Hamidiye quickly find out that they could only be tried through a military court martial They became immune to civil administration. Realizing their immunity, they turned their tribes into "legalized robber brigades" as they steal grain, reap fields not of their possession, drive off herds, and openly steal from shopkeepers. Some argue that the creation of the Hamidiye "further antagonized the Armenian population" and it worsened the very conflict they were created to prevent.

Kurdish chieftains also taxed the population of the region in sustaining these units, which Armenians perceived as exploitation. When Armenian spokesmen confronted the Kurdish chieftain (issue of double taxation), it brought about the enmity between both populations. The Hamidiye cavalry harassed and assaulted Armenians.

In 1908, after the overthrow of the Sultan, the Hamidiye Cavalry was disbanded as an organized force, but as they were "tribal forces" before official recognition, they stayed as "tribal forces" after dismemberment. The Hamidiye Cavalry is described as a military disappointment and a failure because of its contribution to tribal feuds.

===== Armenians =====
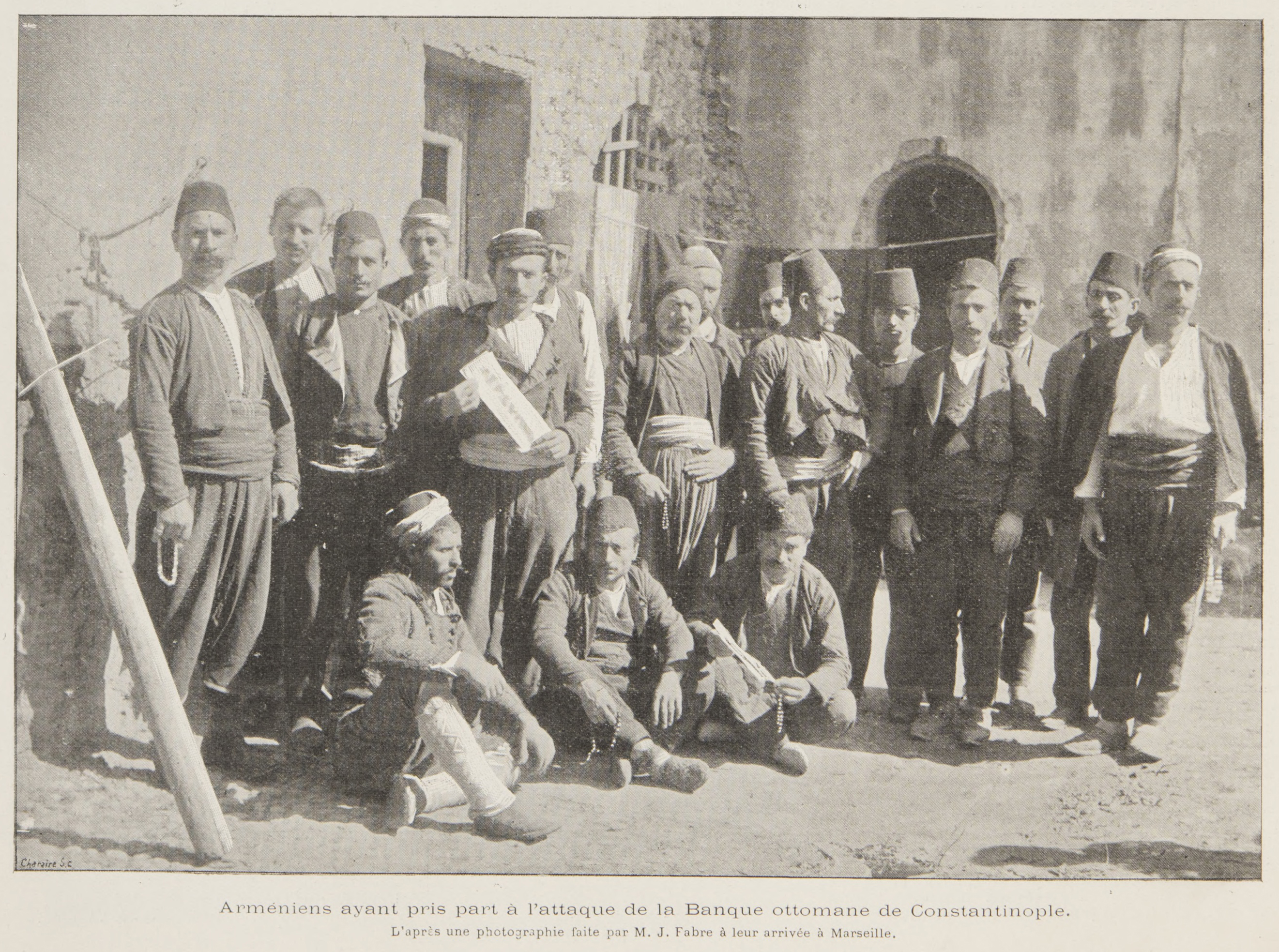
Surviving members of the takeover after they arrived in Marseille.

A major role in the Hamidian massacres of 1894-96 has been often ascribed to the Hamidiye regiments, particularly during the bloody suppression of Sasun (1894). On July 25, 1897 the Khanasor Expedition was against the Kurdish Mazrik tribe (Muzuri Kurds) who owned a significant portion of this cavalry. The first notable battle in the Armenian resistance movement took place in Sassoun, where nationalist ideals were proliferated by Hunchak activists, such as Mihran Damadian, Hampartsoum Boyadjian, and Hrayr. The Armenian Revolutionary Federation also played a significant role in arming the people of the region. The Armenians of Sassoun confronted the Ottoman army and Kurdish irregulars at Sassoun, succumbing to superior numbers. This was followed by Zeitun Rebellion (1895–1896), which between the years 1891 and 1895, Hunchak activists toured various regions of Cilicia and Zeitun to encourage resistance, and established new branches of the Social Democrat Hunchakian Party.

In this area, something resembling a civil war between Armenians and Muslims (involving Hamidiye (cavalry)) raged for months before being brought to an end through mediation by the Great Powers. However, instead of Armenian autonomy in these regions, Kurds (Kurdish tribal chiefs) retained much of their autonomy and power. The Abdulhamid made little attempt to alter the traditional power structure of "segmented, agrarian Kurdish societies" – agha, shayk, and tribal chief. Because of their geographical position at the southern and eastern fringe of the empire and mountainous topography, and limited transportation and communication system. The state had little access to these provinces and were forced to make informal agreements with tribal chiefs, for instance, the Ottoman qadi and mufti did not have jurisdiction over religious law which bolstered Kurdish authority and autonomy.

The 1896 Ottoman Bank takeover was perpetrated by an Armenian group armed with pistols, grenades, dynamite and hand-held bombs against the Ottoman Bank in Istanbul. The seizure of the bank lasted 14 hours, resulting in the deaths of 10 of the Armenian men and Ottoman soldiers. The Ottoman reaction to the takeover saw further massacres and pogroms of the several thousand Armenians living in Constantinople and Sultan Abdul Hamid II threatening to level the entire building itself. However, intervention on part of the European diplomats in the city managed to persuade the men to give, assigning safe passage to the survivors to France. Despite the level of violence, the incident had wrought, the takeover was reported positively in the European press, praising the men for their courage and the objectives they attempted to accomplish.

==== Economy ====
Economically, the empire had difficulty in repaying the Ottoman public debt to European banks, which caused the establishment of the Council of Administration of the Ottoman Public Debt. By the end of the 19th century, the main reason the empire was not overrun by Western powers was their attempt to maintain a balance of power in the area. Both Austria and Russia wanted to increase their spheres of influence and territory at the expense of the Ottoman Empire but were kept in check mostly by Britain, which feared Russian dominance in the Eastern Mediterranean.

== Image gallery ==
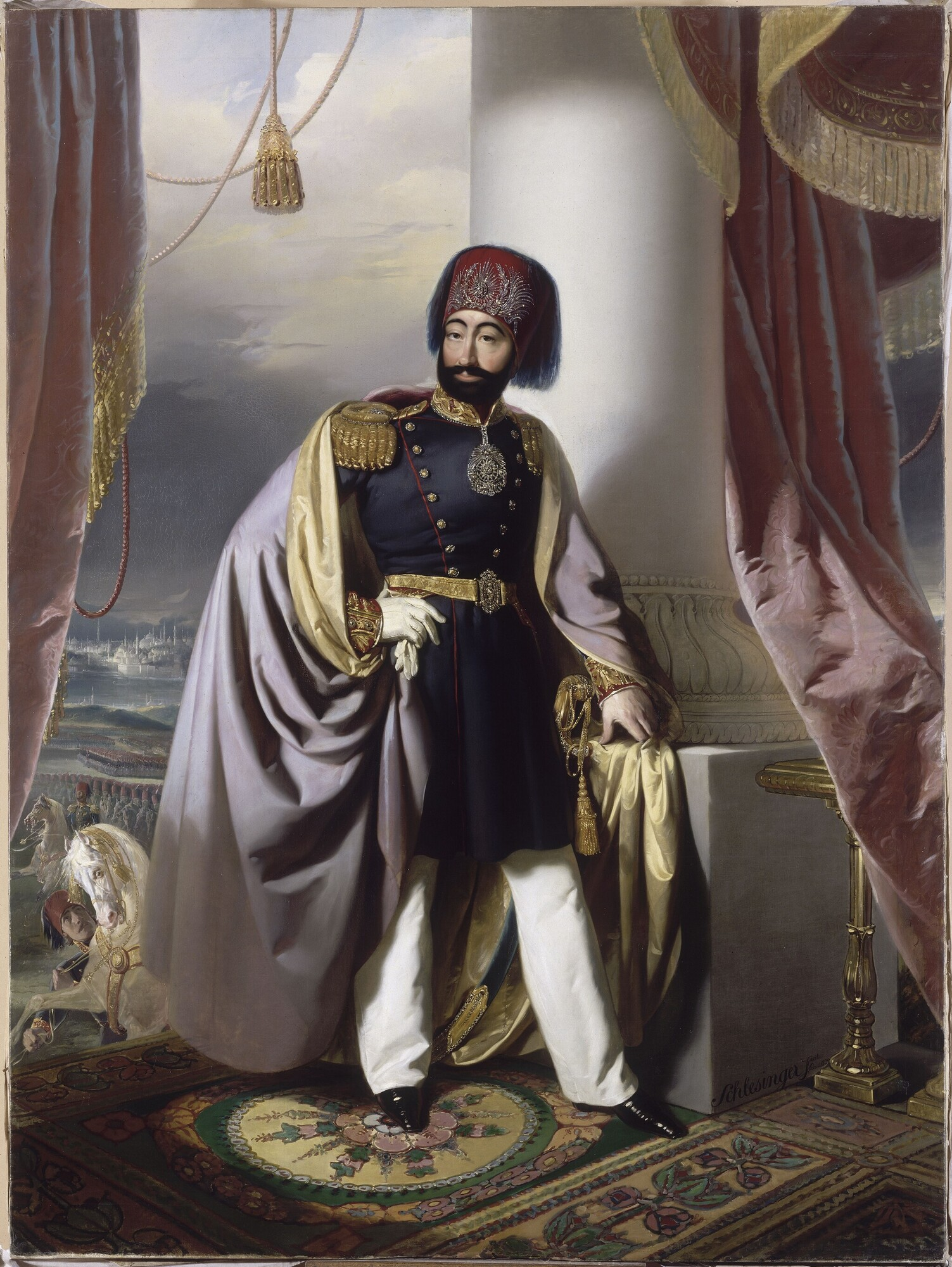
Mahmud II

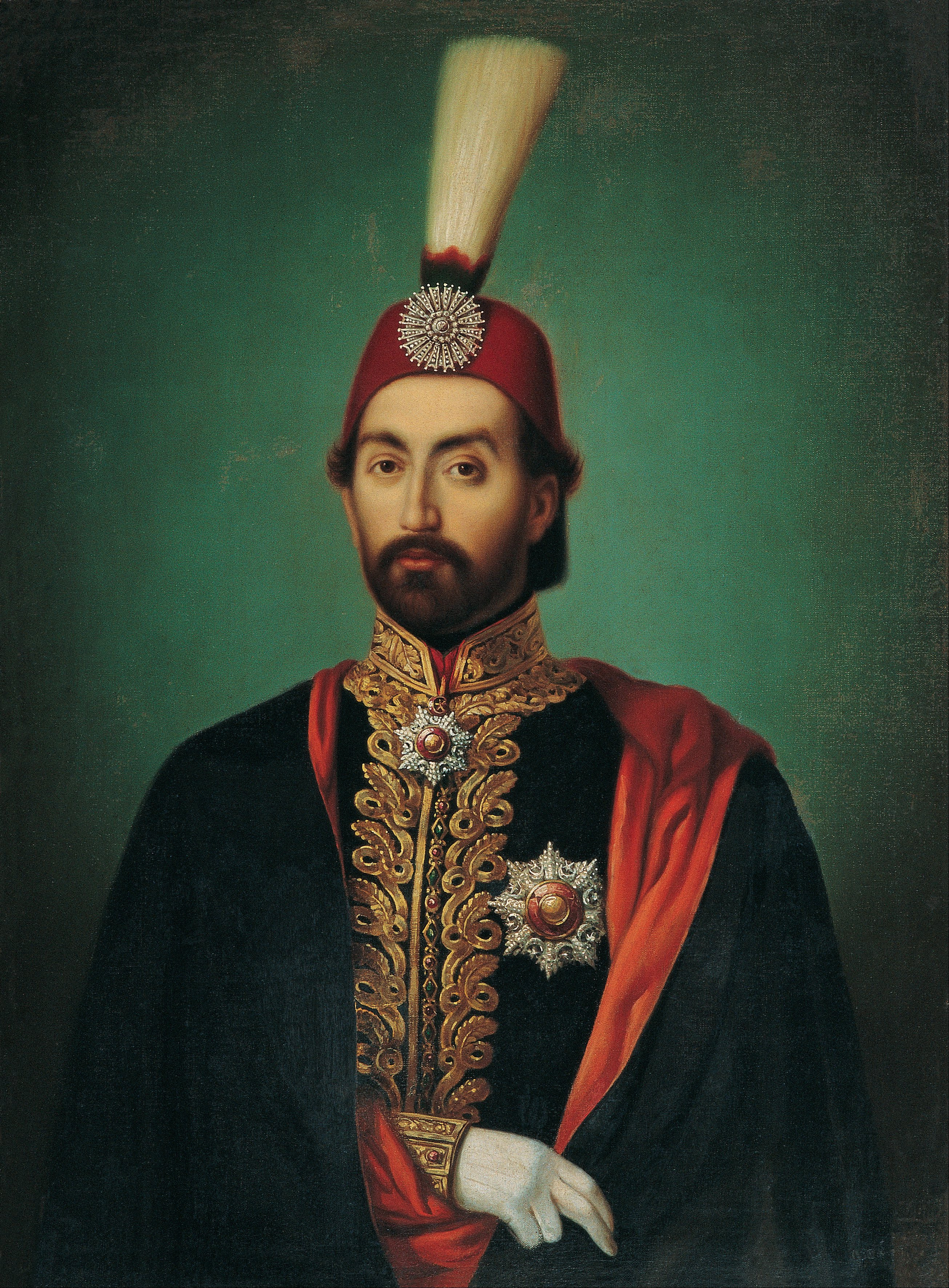
Abdülmecid

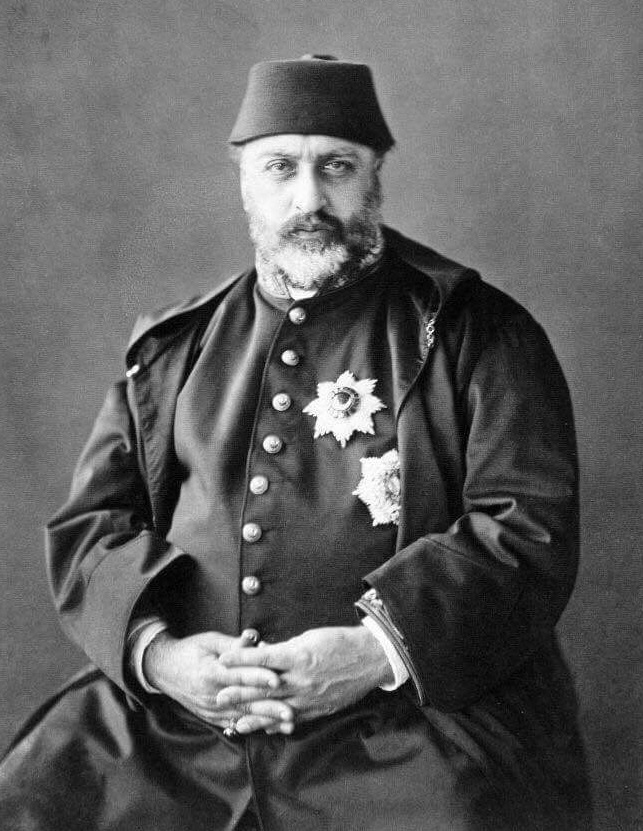
Abdülaziz

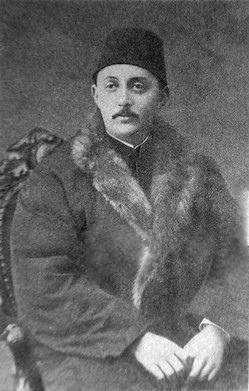
Murad V

== Bibliography ==
- Karpat, Kemal H. (May 1978). "Ottoman Population Records and the Census of 1881/82–1893". International Journal of Middle East Studies. 9 (2): 237–274. doi:10.1017/S0020743800000088. S2CID 162337621.
- Kinross, Patrick (1977). The Ottoman Centuries: The Rise and Fall of the Turkish Empire. London: Perennial. ISBN 978-0-688-08093-8.
- McDowall, David (2004). A Modern History of the Kurds. I.B. Tauris.
- Shaw, Standford J. (August 1978). "The Ottoman Census System and Population, 1831–1914". International Journal of Middle East Studies. 9 (3): 325–338. doi:10.1017/S0020743800033602. S2CID 161326705.

== See also ==
- Abolition of the Ottoman sultanate – Abolition of the monarchy in Turkey
- Dissolution of the Ottoman Empire – 1908–1922 political event
- History of the Ottoman Empire
- Ottoman decline thesis – Historical narrative
